= Scottish Women's Hospital at Royaumont =

Medical hospital during World War I, located in Val-d'Oise, France

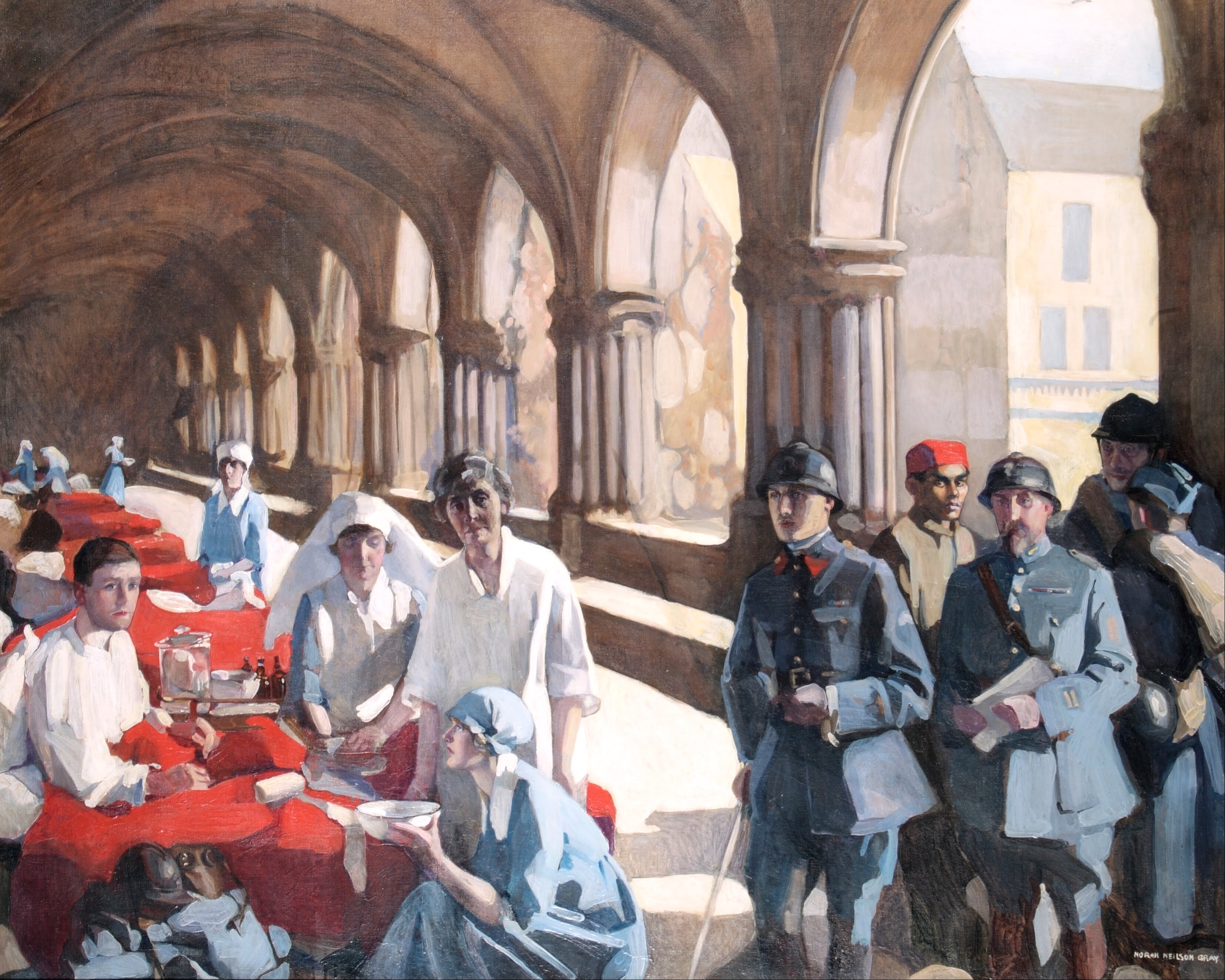
Dr Frances Ivens inspecting a French patient at Royaumont. Painting by Norah Neilson Gray.

The Scottish Women's Hospital at Royaumont was a medical hospital during World War I active from January 1915 to March 1919 operated by Scottish Women's Hospitals (SWH), under the direction of the French Red Cross and located at Royaumont Abbey. The Abbey is a former Cistercian abbey, located near Asnières-sur-Oise in Val-d'Oise, approximately 30 km north of Paris, France. The hospital was started by Dr Frances Ivens and founder of SWH, Dr Elsie Maud Inglis. It was especially noted for its performance treating soldiers involved in the Battle of the Somme.

The hospital was officially known as the Hôpital Auxiliaire 301 and was never affiliated with the British military or British Red Cross. Nora Neilson Gray's painting was called Hôpital Auxiliaire 1918 was not originally accepted by the Imperial War Museum. The soldiers treated at Royaumont were mostly French with some Senegalese and North Africans from the French colonial troops. It was not the only facility of its kind; other female hospital units in France include the Women's Hospital Corps established by Louisa Garrett Anderson and Flora Murray and the Women's Imperial Service League established by Florence Stoney in Paris and Boulogne, but SWH was the largest such group with other locations in Serbia, Greece, Romania, and Corsica. Royaumont was the largest British voluntary hospital, one of the closest such hospitals to the front line, and the only one to operate continuously from January 1915 to March 1919. An ancillary hospital to Royaumont was established even closer to the front line-at Villers-Cotterêts.

== Beginnings ==
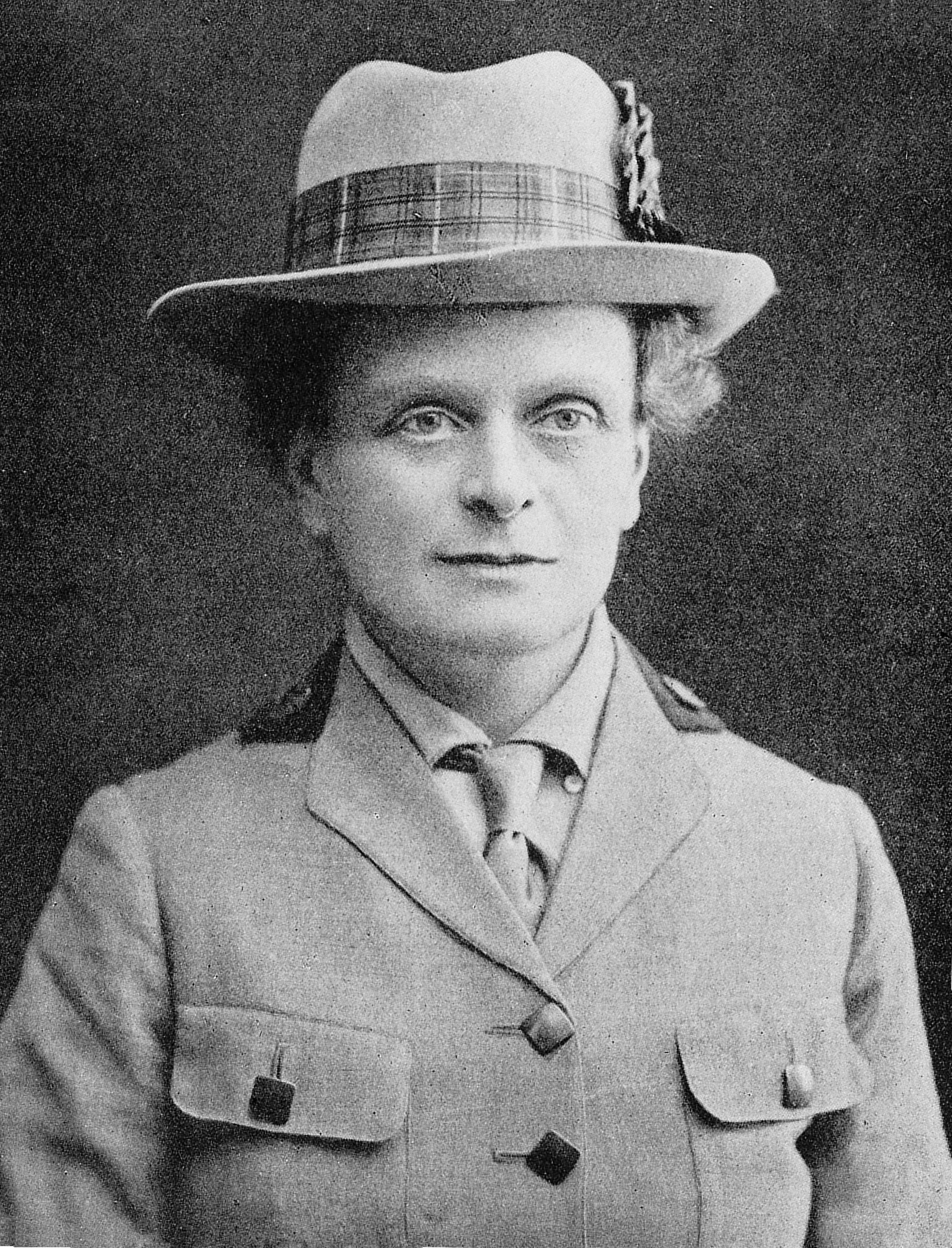
Dr Elsie Inglis

The SWH initially organized two units of 100 beds each to be entirely staffed by women partially funded by the affiliated National Union of Women's Suffrage Societies. The UK War Office and the British Red Cross turned down the offered units and the women turned to the French and Belgian Red Cross. The Vicomtesse de la Panouse, wife of the French military attaché to the French embassy in London, helped the group identify Royaumont Abbey, the property of Édouard Goüin. Goüin was a rich industrialist and philanthropist whose poor health rendered him unable to fight and offering the use of the facility was to be part of his contribution to the war.

The inside rather appalls one at first, it’s so very large and so many odd staircases; in fact it is very eerie, especially as there is no light anywhere at the moment and as you know a candle doesn't give much...The room I had felt very musty and in the morning my dress felt so damp I was afraid to get into it...

— Littlejohn, the cook for the Women's hospital

Although the facility was not ready to be used as a hospital, Dr. Ivens was very happy with the location, writing in 1917: "Although within sounds of the guns, its architectural beauty and the forest scenery in the neighbourhood made it an ideal spot in which the wounded soldiers could forget for a time the horrors and discomfort of war," When wards were overfilled, patients were occasionally carted outdoors between May and October. Noticing that patients so placed recovered more quickly, doctors later accommodated patients outside to increase exposure to sunlight.

== Facilities ==
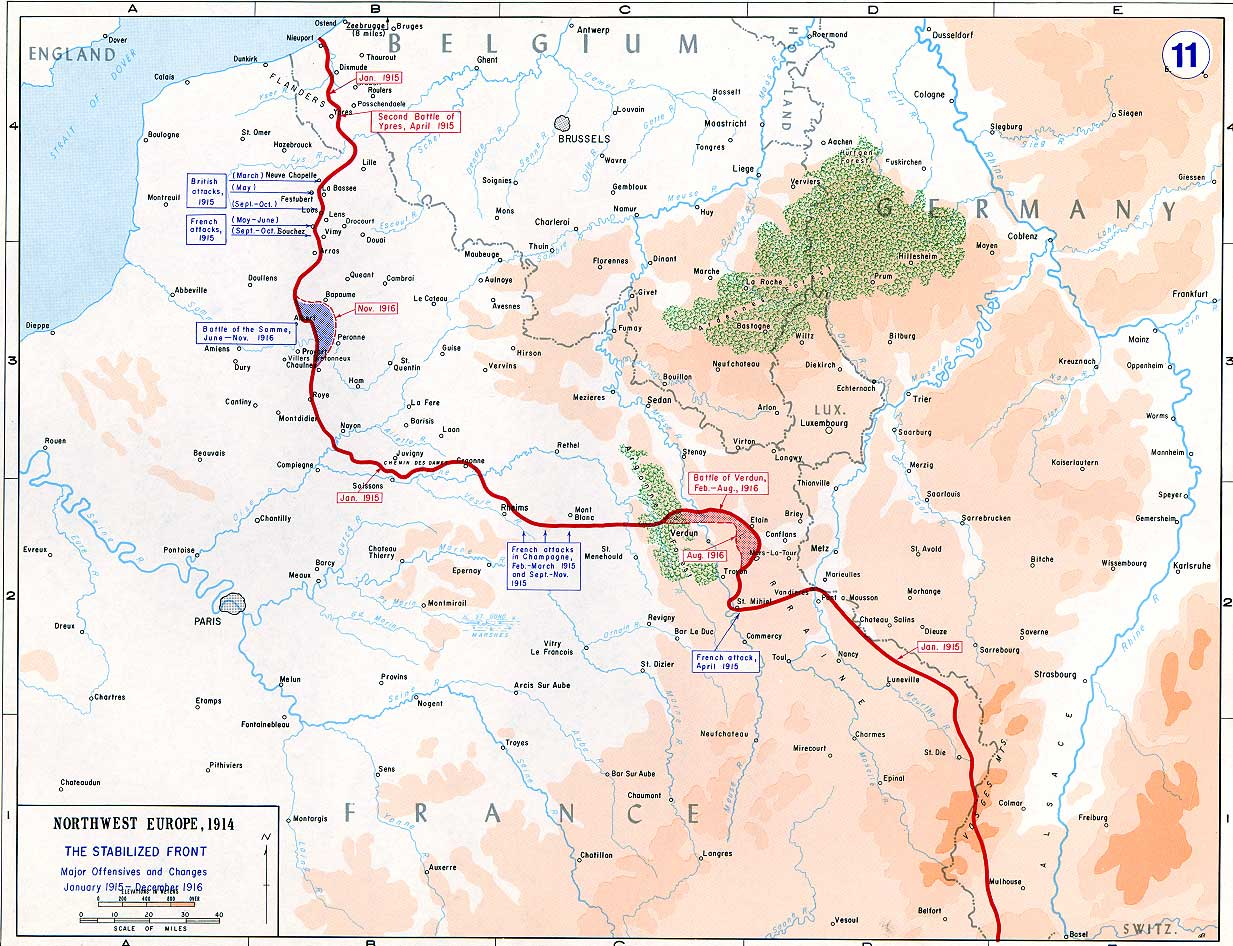
The Western Front 1915–1916.

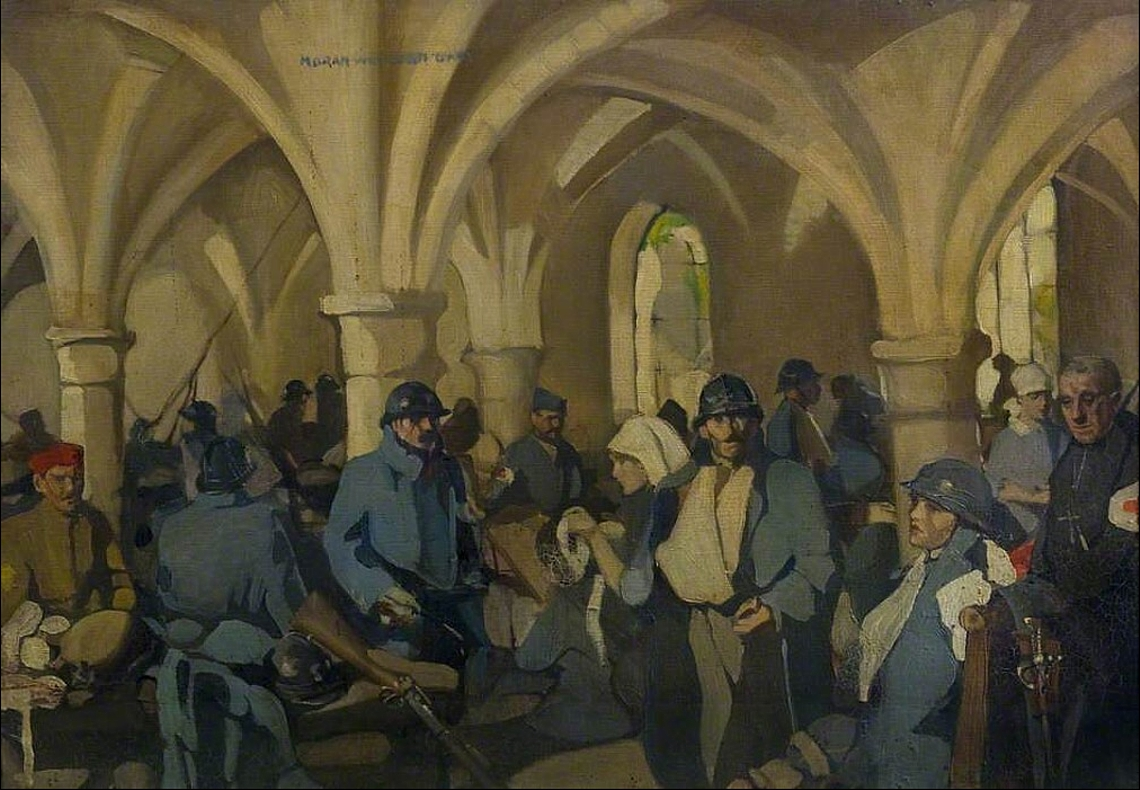
Hôpital Auxilaire 1918 by Norah Neilson Gray.

Patients generally arrived from the Western Front by train to the evacuation station in Creil (12 km away). There was no possibility of transferring patients to other nearby hospitals and patient load was occasionally extreme. During the Battle of the Somme, the surgeons and doctors worked for eight days with a total of only 16 hours of sleep. Conditions at the facility were occasionally insufficient and the hospital failed an initial inspection before opening on 13 January 1915. Electricity was at times intermittent and in case of an outage surgeries were performed by candlelight.

== Research ==
Doctors at Royaumont also undertook cutting-edge research, focusing on the treatment of gas gangrene. The doctors found X-ray and bacteriology for diagnosis and surgical debridement of affected tissue and antiserum therapy to be especially effective. Doctors at the facility believed the collaboration of different specialties was important in fighting infection and avoiding excess amputations. The hospital had a mobile X-ray car manufactured by Austins and purchased for £300. Installation of the X-ray equipment was assisted by Marie Curie and included water and electrical sources independent of the rest of the facility. The X-ray car was highly coveted; other hospitals in the area occasionally used it and the British military attempted to impound and keep the car for itself. In spite of their work, Dr. Ivans was restricted in her ability to publish and present her results. In 1918 she had to obtain permission from General Célestin Sieur of the French military medical services to publish her results, and she was not allowed to present her work directly to the Société de Chirurgie de Paris, her work being instead presented by a third party.

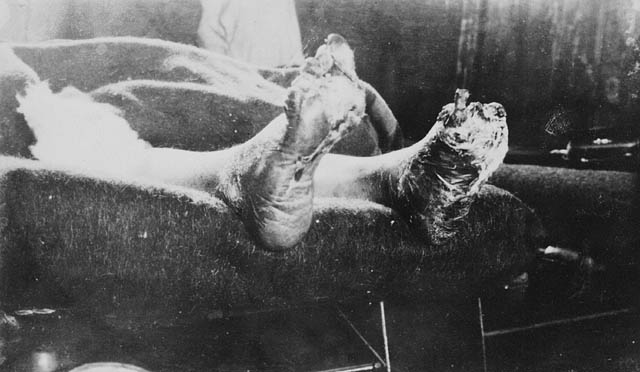
Trench foot as seen on an unidentified soldier during World War I

Doctors at the Scottish Hospital at Royaumont made numerous important discoveries, although their contribution was not always acknowledged and their work required rediscovery. Dr Agnes Savill presented to the Royal Society of Medicine in 1916 her work in the use of X-rays to diagnose the presence of gas gangrene infection before the bacteriological reports could and before the advent of symptoms. This work was not widely accepted and in 1917 she expressed a desire that other radiologists consider this work to confirm her conclusions. Dr. Ivens presented on a similar topic and both Dr. Ivens and Dr. Savill's presentations were reviewed in the British Medical Journal. In related work, Dr E. J. Dalyell published in the British Medical Journal in 1917 about the presence of B. oedematiens in gas gangrene. Subsequent work on the use of X-ray for the diagnosis of gas gangrene do not refer to the work of SMH doctors. Among other work, Dr L.M. Henry wrote an MD thesis on the treatment of wounds that she presented in 1920.

== Reception ==
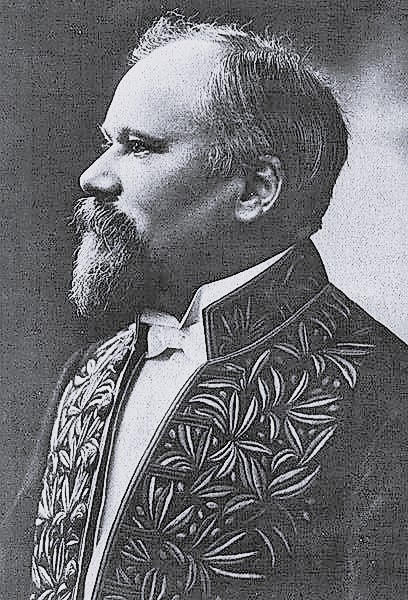
Raymond Poincaré as President

Accounts vary as to the reception of women doctors, but before the war, the French Red Cross organization, the Société de Secours aux Blessés Militaires, claimed that Germany was victorious in the Franco-Prussian War in 1870 in part through the use of ‘feminine hands’. Mme Marie-Christine Daudy, daughter of Henry Goüin (1900-1977), stated that while her father admired the female doctors, French politicians and military personalities who visited the hospital were initially less enthusiastic about their work. Among official recognition, Maréchal Joffre visited the hospital and twice sent a representative, Lt Colonel Rampsont, on his behalf. The French president, Raymond Poincaré and his wife visited on 20 September 1916. In 1918, General Henri Jean Descoings wrote: "We will never be able to express adequately to the Scottish ladies at Royaumont and Villers Cotterêt our gratitude for their devotion to the French wounded’. Villers Cotterêt was a field ambulance established by the Royaumont doctors in 1917. The Comtesse de Courson, in her review of efforts during the war, also believed there was initially French resistance to female doctors, but that the doctors were well qualified and respected.

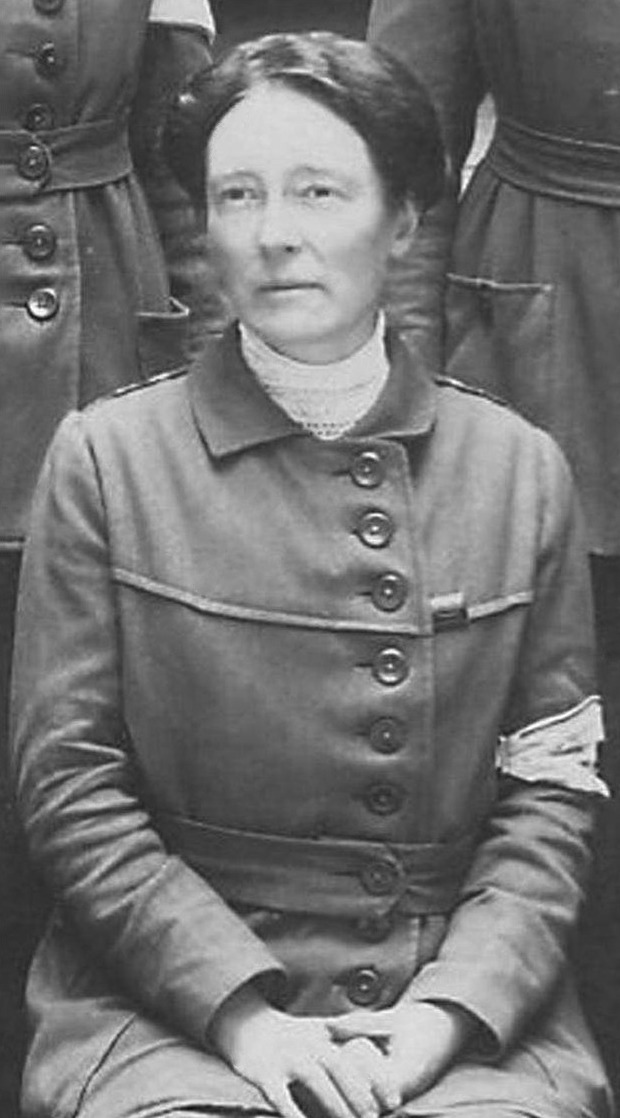
Louisa Garrett Anderson

Female medical students in the UK raised money for the SWH and positions in the organization were desired. The group was also supported by, for instance, Dr Louisa Garrett Anderson (daughter of Elizabeth, pioneer of medical education for women, a suffragette and Chief Surgeon of the Women's Hospital Corps).

== Legacy ==
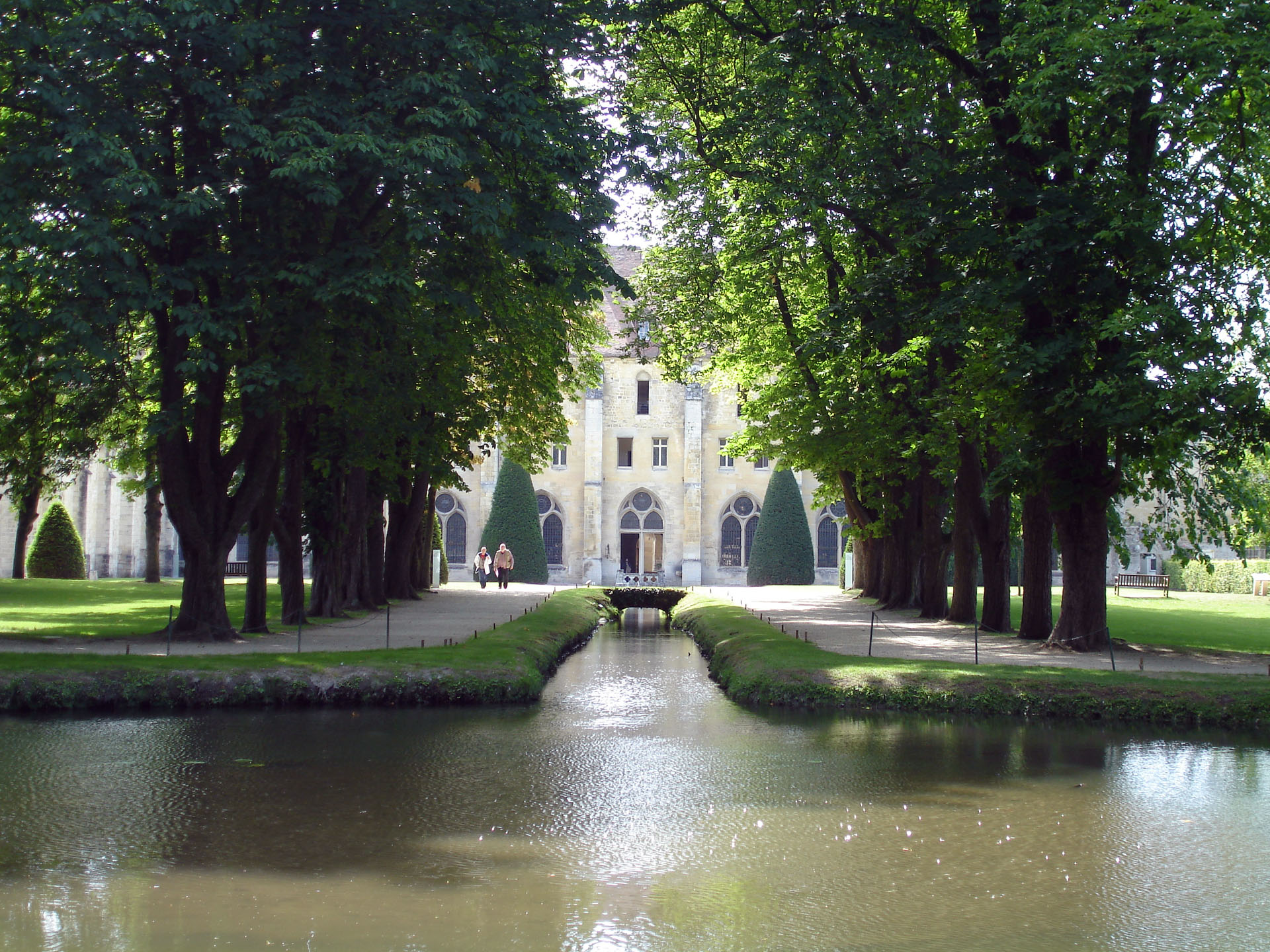
Contemporary view of the abbey

After the war the Chief Medical Officer, Dr Frances Ivens CBE MS(Lond) ChM(Liverp) FRGOG (1870–1944), was awarded membership of the Légion d'honneur.

In spite of this support, Dr Ivens could not obtain a commission as a doctor in the British Army. While by the end of the war she gained a formal appointment within the French military; besides her own decoration, six other Royaumont doctors, and at least one nursing Sister Gertrude Lindsay, were awarded the Croix de Guerre; however there is no mention of the hospital in the British Official Medical History of the War and no British medals were given to the staff. Winston Churchill praised their work in a letter to the MP A. F. Whyte: "The record of their work in Russia and Rumania lit up by the fame of Elsie Inglis will shine in history. Their achievements in France and Serbia and Greece and other theatres were no less valuable, and no body of women has won higher reputation for organizing power and for efficacy in works of mercy."

Many of the doctors left general practice after the war. An exception was Dr L. Aldrich-Blake who worked in obstetrics and gynaecology. The women established the Royaumont Association after the unit disbanded in 1919 and there was an attempt to establish another SWH unit at Royaumont at the onset of World War II, but this failed.

== List of hospital staff ==
=== Doctors ===
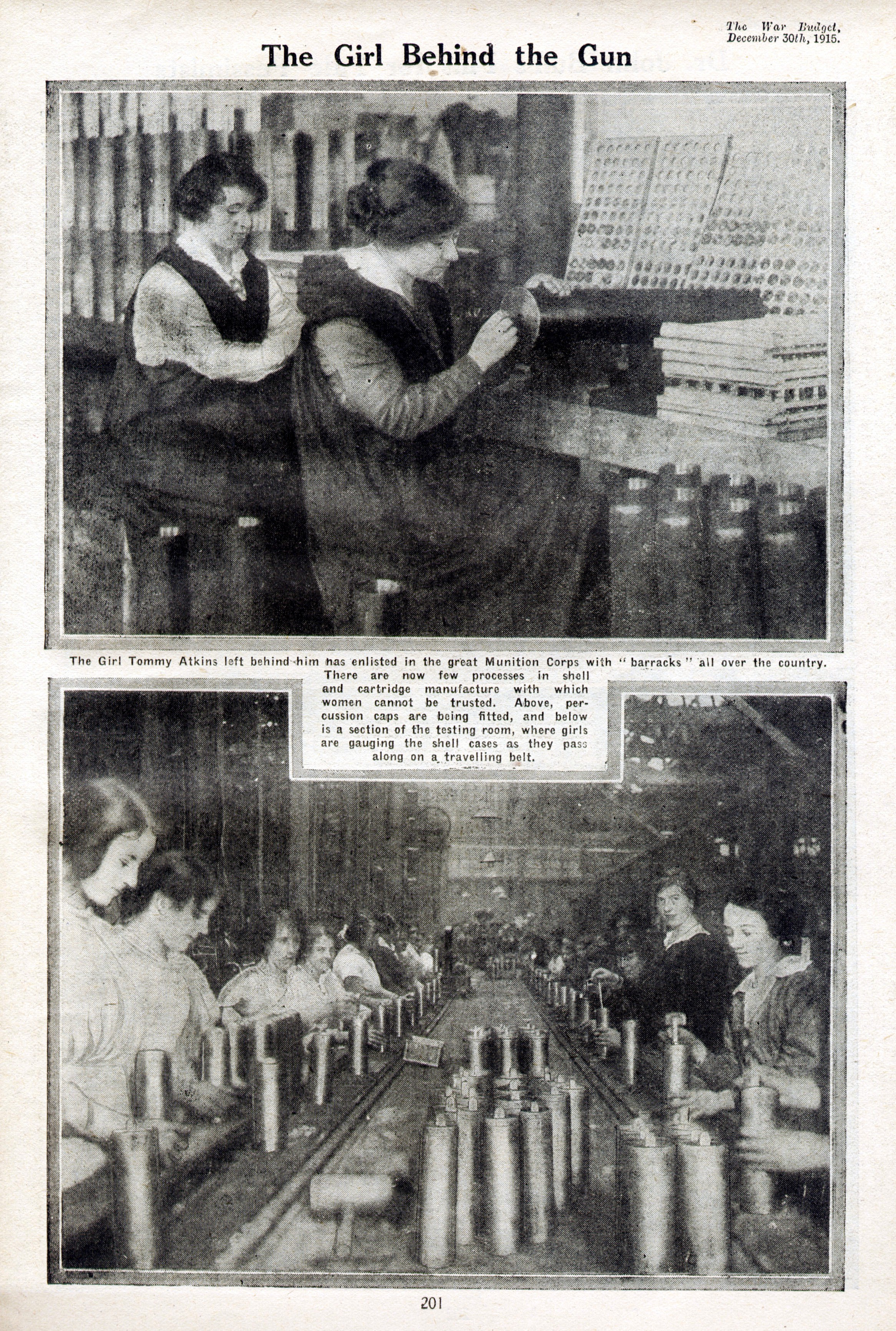
Poster showing women workers, 1915.

- Dr Louisa Aldrich-Blake - surgeon (later worked in obstetrics and gynaecology)
- Dr Agnes Forbes Blackadder Savill - Radiologist
- Dr Elizabeth Butler - Pathologist (wife of Frederick Butler)
- Dr Elizabeth Courtauld - anaesthetist
- Dr Elsie Jean Dalyell
- Dr Lydia Manly Henry - Surgeon
- Dr Elsie Maud Inglis
- Dr Florence Elsie Inglis - Niece of Elsie Maud Inglis
- Dr Frances Ivens - Chief Medical Officer in Charge of Royaumont
- Dr Helen Lillie - Surgeon

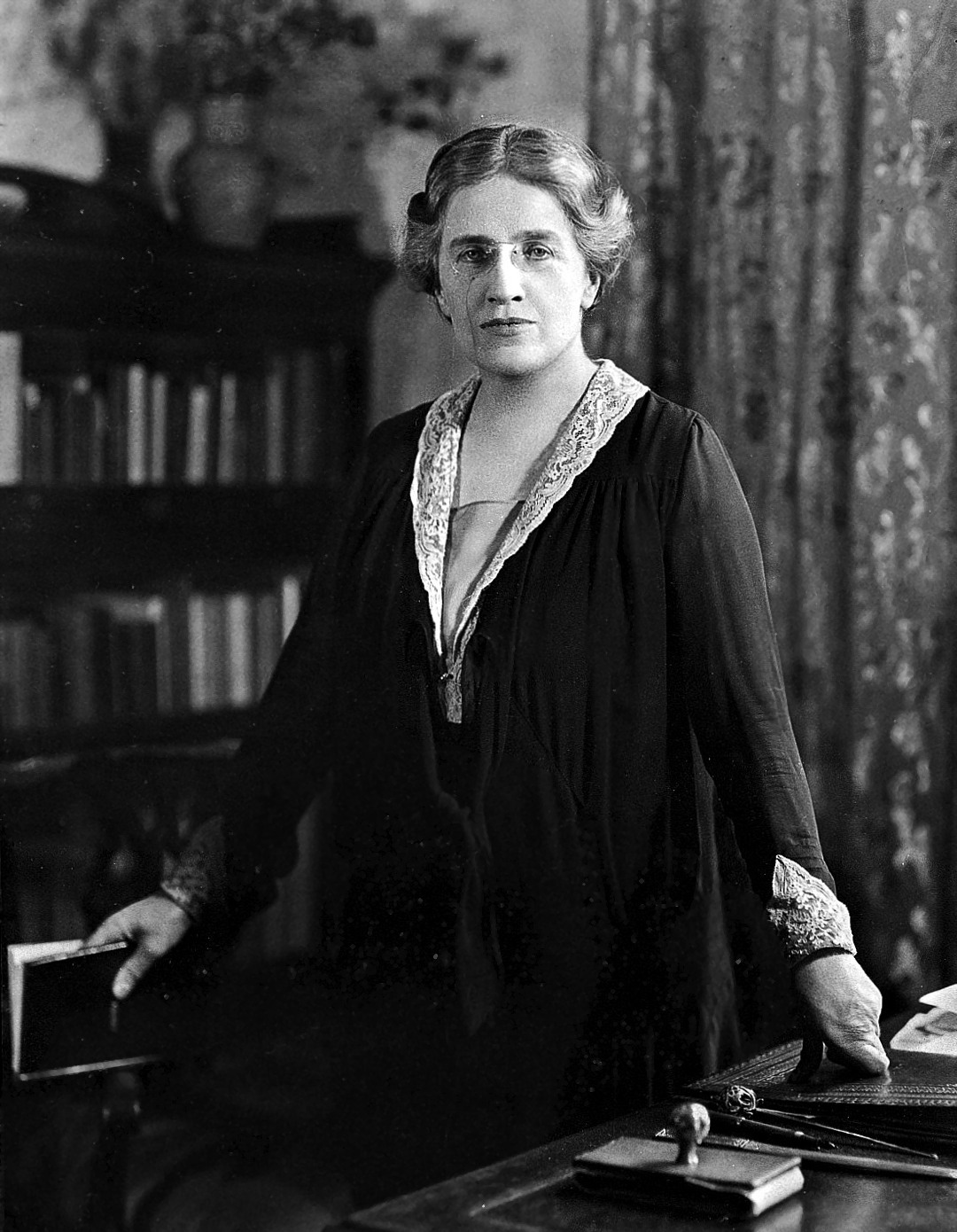
Louisa Martindale

- Dr Louisa Martindale - Also worked at other SWH facilities
- Dr Helen McDougall
- Dr Ruth Nicholson - Assistant surgeon
- Dr Gladys Miall-Smith
- Dr Winifred Margaret Ross - surgeon
- Dr Marian Elizabeth Wilson - died July 1917 of acute appendicitis

=== Other staff ===
Transcriptions of the names of nurses involved with the Scottish Women's Hospitals taken from original lists held at the Imperial War Museum originally published in early 1920 are available at "Scarletfinders: Scottish Women's Hospitals Index of Names". A total of 184 nurses served at Royaumont. Most of these completed their 6 month contracts including 37 who extended their service. Of the 18 who left before the end of their contracted service, 11 left because the war had come to an end, and three were dismissed – one for subordination, one for ‘bad’ behaviour and one unspecified.

A complete list in also available online.

A selection of individuals is listed below.

- Charlotte Almond - Orderly
- Millicent Sylvia Armstrong - Orderly
- Isobel Dorothy Banks - Ambulance Driver
- Gertude Beckett - Nurse
- Frederick Butler - Ambulance Driver
- Lucy Helen Carmichael - Orderly
- Marjorie Chapman - Nurse LI
- Elizabeth Colledge
- Vera Christina Chute Collum - X-ray assistant
- Patricia Ramsay Crabb - Nurse
- Margaret Charlotte Davidson - Orderly then Nurse
- Margaret Balfour Doig - Nurse
- Alma Dolling - Orderly
- Ruby Jamieson Donaldson - Orderly
- Chloris Sarah Drabble - Nurse
- Ariadne Mavis Dunderdale - Nurse
- Margaret Fairle - Orderly
- Catherine Maggie Findlay - Cook
- Isabel Kelman Flett - Nurse
- Elizabeth Forbes - Orderly and Storekeeper
- Madame Fox - Seamstress
- Elizabeth Gilmour Manuel Arthur - Orderly
- Mary Gray - Nurse (died at Royaumont of appendicitis in January 1916)
- Margaret Gray

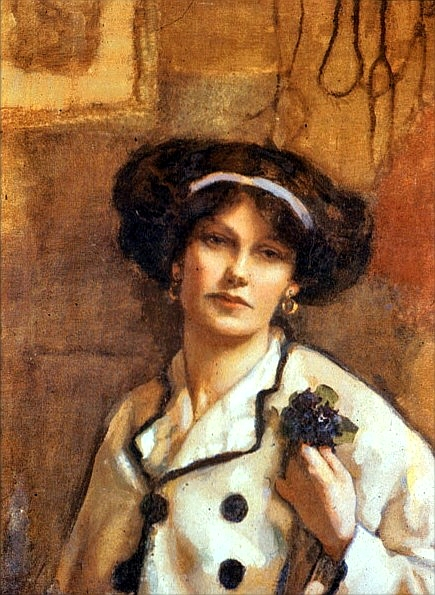
Norah Neilson Gray self-portrait (1918)

- Norah Neilson Gray - Nurse
- Edith Catherine Hacon - Orderly, Housekeeper, and Seamstress
- Cecily Hamilton - Nurse, clerk
- Katherine Harley - Administrator

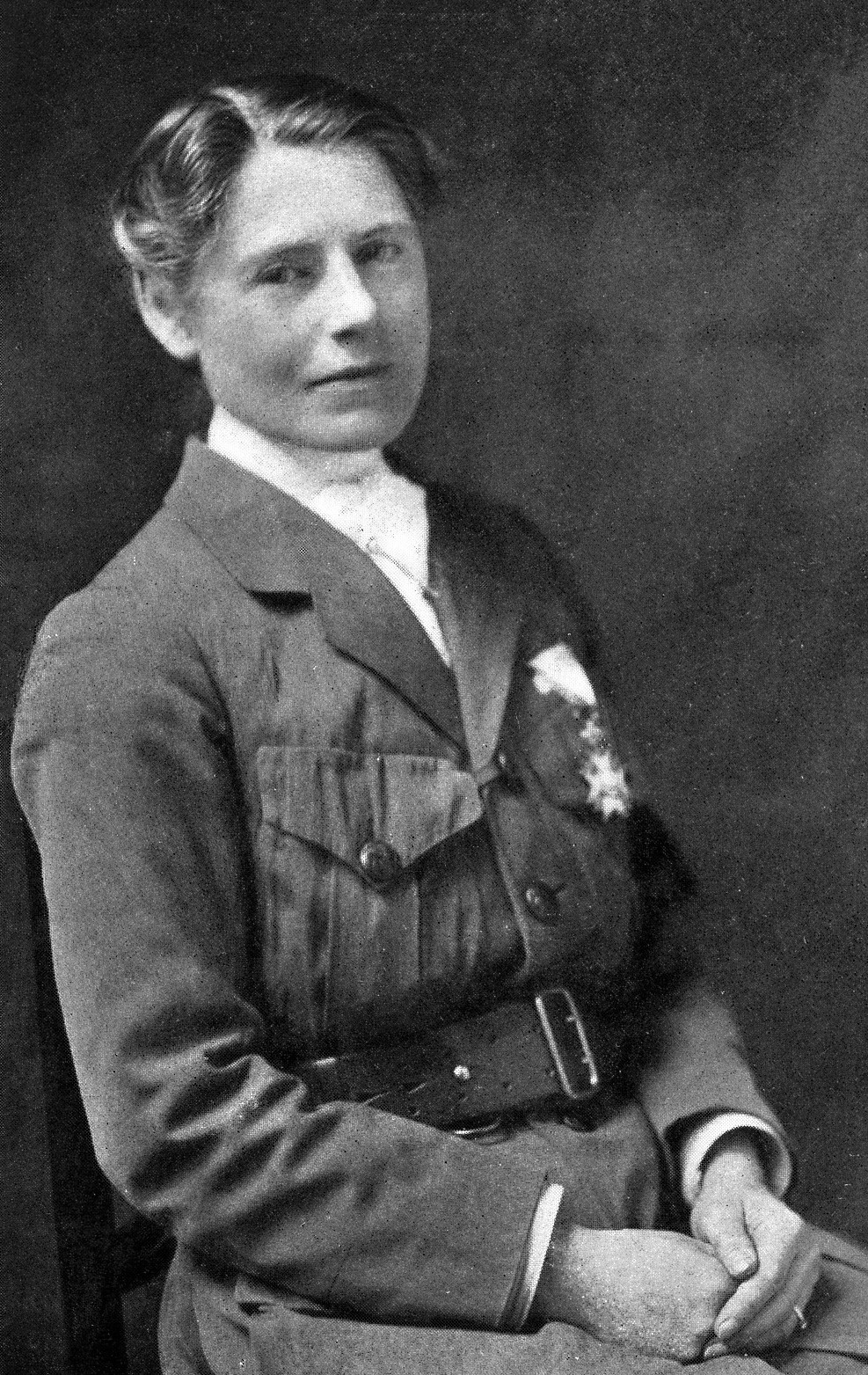
Evelina Haverfield

- Evelina Haverfield - Also worked at other SWH facilities
- Etta Helen Maude Inglis - Orderly, Nurse, sister of Florence Elsie Inglis, niece of Elsie Maud Ingles
- Violet Inglis - Orderly, sister of Florence Elsie Inglis, niece of Elsie Maud Ingles
- Mabel Effie Jeffery - Nurse
- Anna George Kreil - Orderly
- Isa Andrews Larnoch - Nurse
- Mary Crockatt Leuchars - Orderly
- Jean Marjorie Lindsay - Orderly
- Dorothy Littlejohn - Cook
- Jessie MacPherson - Cook
- Elizabeth Forbes MacPherson - Orderly and Storekeeper
- Jean Forbes MacPherson - Cook
- Agnes Williamina Manson - Orderly
- Eveline Christiana Martin - Clerk
- Eunice Jean McGregor - Ambulance driver
- Florence Cecilia Moffat - Orderly, Physiotherapist
- Alison May Nicholson - Orderly, sister of Ruth Nicholson
- Margaret Nicolson - Nurse
- Catherine Bride O'Rorke - Nurse, awarded by the French Government the Médaille militaire
- Winifred Parry - Nurse
- M. A. Prys-Owen - Nurse
- Norah Quihampton - Nurse
- Ishobel Ross - Also worked at other SWH facilities
- Ruth Scott - Orderly
- Madge Ramsay Smith - Secretary and Administrator
- Marjorie Starr - Orderly
- Nettie Stein - Orderly
- Jean Thom - Nurse
- Mary Moir Trail - Orderly
- Maude Evelyn Waddle - Orderly
- Beatrice Victoria Warr - Nurse
- Dulcie Mary White - Nurse
- Irene Mildred Whittet - Nurse
- Theodora Williamson - Orderly
- Maud Winstanly - Nurse, Matron
- Florence Stanley Winter - Nurse

== Further Information ==
A group photograph (with names) of Royaumont staff can be seen here https://archiveandlibrary.rcsed.ac.uk/special-collections/scottish-womens-hospitals-for-foreign-service/scottish-womens-hospitals-at-royaumont-france/1342699-group-photograph-of-royaumont-staff?
