= Agnes Estcourt-Oswald =

British ophthalmologist

- Born: 1874; Peshawar
- Died: 19 February 1965 (aged 90–91); Gipping
- Occupation: Ophthalmologist

Agnes Estcourt-Oswald (1874 – 19 February 1965) was a British ophthalmologist who advocated for animal welfare and anti-vivisection.

== Biography ==
Estcourt-Oswald was born in 1874 in Peshawar. She graduated M.B., B.S. from London School of Medicine for Women in 1903. She qualified D.P.H. in 1911 and worked as a medical officer at Colchester Military Hospital during World War I. She also worked at the Scottish Women's Hospital at Royaumont under Frances Ivens. She opened her own ophthalmic practice in Colchester in 1919. She obtained a D.O.M.S. in 1925. In 1933, she was president of the Colchester Medical Society. Estcourt-Oswald worked in the North-east Essex division of the British Medical Association.

She was associated with the Hampstead and District Vegetarian Society. She was secretary of the Colchester branch of the RSPCA. At the annual meeting of the RSPCA in 1951, Estcourt-Oswald called for the abolishment of circus acts involving animals.

== Anti-vivisection ==
Estcourt-Oswald was a speaker for the British Union for the Abolition of Vivisection. She commented that 612,563 experiments had been made on animals in 1931 but no benefit was discovered from them. She also commented that there was no advantage from vaccination and described it as "one of the biggest frauds of the day".

Estcourt-Oswald was a member of the Animal Defence and Anti-Vivisection Society. She was a speaker at meetings of the National Anti-Vaccination League.
