= Elizabeth Courtauld =

British doctor in First World War

Elizabeth Courtauld (1867–1947) was a pioneer British physician and anaesthetist, practising in India. She was a volunteer doctor at a field hospital run by women (Scottish Women's Hospital) close to the front line in France during the First World War.

== Family and early education ==
Elizabeth Courtauld was the third child of industrialist and politician George Courtauld and Susanna Elizabeth Savill, born on 2 December 1867 in Gosfield, Essex. Her elder siblings were Katherine Courtauld, farmer and suffragist, and Samuel Augustine Courtauld, who became a director of the family firm. Her mother died when she was a teenager.

Courtauld completed her formal education at a residential school at Edge Hill, Wimbledon. She then returned to live at home aged 16 where she received private tuition in a range of subjects including botany, music, drawing, geography, French, German, geology, 'sums' and Euclid. By age 19 she still received music and drawing lessons but she also had responsibilities for some housekeeping and teaching her younger siblings.

== Medical training and nursing experience ==
In her early 20s Courtauld began taking extended trips to visit friends in Germany, and commenced nursing studies at the Deaconesses Institute of Kaiserswerth in the Dusselforf area, established by Theodor Fliedner. The Institute provided care for the needy sick and provided education for women in nursing skills and theology. Florence Nightingale had previously studied there.

She began considering training to become a doctor but her father strongly disapproved of the idea, and she began work as a nurse in Cheltenham hospital in January 1891. She worked as a nurse for four years until she entered the London School of Medicine for Women in 1895, aged 28. She studied alongside Frances Ivens and Augusta Lewin, who she would later work alongside in France. In 1901 she qualified by sitting for the licentiate of the Society of Apothecaries, which entitled her to be entered on the Medical Register.

She followed this with a degree of Doctor of Medicine of Brussels ('Brussels MD') in 1903. She did not have the qualifications to sit for a medical degree in London and the Brussels MD had become an established route for several hundred other medical practitioners in similar circumstances in England and Wales in recent years.

== Medical practice in Bangalore & Ikkadu, Tiruvallur ==
After qualifying she worked at the Church of England Zenana Mission Hospital in Bangalore, established by the Church of England Zenana Missionary Society The zenana missions were made up of female missionaries who could visit Indian women in their own homes with the aim of converting them to Christianity. The purdah system made it impossible for many Indian women, especially high status women, to access health care. By training as doctors and nurses, the women of the zenana missions were accepted by the women of India into their homes. The zenana missions expanded over time from home visits to mobile clinics in rural areas, women only hospitals and all-girl schools, staffed and run by women both recruited in Britain and those recruited and trained locally in India.

Courtauld described herself as "an independent worker, not a missionary". She worked in Bangalore for the rest of her professional career apart from her service in Europe during the First World War.

She served in the medical part of Mr. William Goudie's Mission at Ikkadu. The Goudie memorial church foundation stone at Tiruvallur was laid in the presence of many, among whom was Dr. Elizabeth Courtauld.

== First World War and service at Royaumont ==
Courtauld was on leave from India after the outbreak of the First World War when Frances Ivens invited her to join the Scottish Women's Hospital unit at Royaumont, an auxiliary hospital with 200 beds established in 1915. She worked there from January 1916 to March 1919.

Courtauld was a supporter of the National Union of Women's Suffrage Societies 17 September 1915 which was active in fundraising for the Scottish Women's Hospitals. Courtauld and other members of the Courtauld family were generous contributors to the funding of the hospital at Royaumont in particular

The hospital came under most pressure during the German advance on the Aisne in May 1918. Courtauld was working in a unit at Villers-Cotterêts, continuing to conduct operations on the wounded day and night in the face of German bombardment and described the situation in a letter to her father: "there came an order for the hospital to evacuate ... Then came an order that heaps of terribly wounded were expected, and we could stay on. We were glad. It seemed horrid to be told to go and leave things behind us. All the night we were hard at it and working under difficulties. Terrible cases came in. Between 1030 and 330 or 4 AM we had to amputate six thighs and one leg, mostly by the light of bits of candle, held by the orderlies, and as for me giving the anaesthetic, I did it more or less in the dark at my end of the patient ... Air raids were over us nearly all night"

Courtauld was a devout Anglican and conducted a daily morning service for hospital staff until this was abandoned due to the volume of work in 1918. She also conducted funeral services in the local cemetery when a Protestant clergyman could not be found.

After leaving Royaumont she worked for a time in the devastated areas of northern France before returning to Bangalore.

She was awarded the Croix de Guerre for her war service.

== Later life ==
Courtauld left Bangalore and retired to Greenstead Green, Essex in 1927, aged 60 and was Churchwarden for her parish church until 1946. She was wealthy throughout her life and a generous benefactor to many causes. These included funding the building of an out-patients' block at Halstead Hospital in memory of her father, who had founded the hospital in 1884. She was elected the first life vice-president of the hospital and served on the committee for many years. During her residence at Greenstead Green she took an interest in the welfare of the village. She erected several houses in the village and provided a children's playing field near the village green.

She died in 1947, aged 81.

== See also ==
- Scottish Women's Hospitals for Foreign Service
- Scottish Women's Hospital at Royaumont
