= Gladys Miall-Smith =

British World War I doctor and women's rights activist

- Born: 1888; St Pancras, London, England
- Died: 3 January 1991 (aged 102); Northampton, Northamptonshire, England
- Education: North London Collegiate School
- Alma mater: University College London, London School of Medicine for Women
- Occupations: medical doctor and campaigner
- Employer(s): French Red Cross, Scottish Women's Hospital at Royaumont, Great Ormond Street Hospital, St. Pancras Borough Council
- Spouse: John Fry (m. 1921, died 1930)

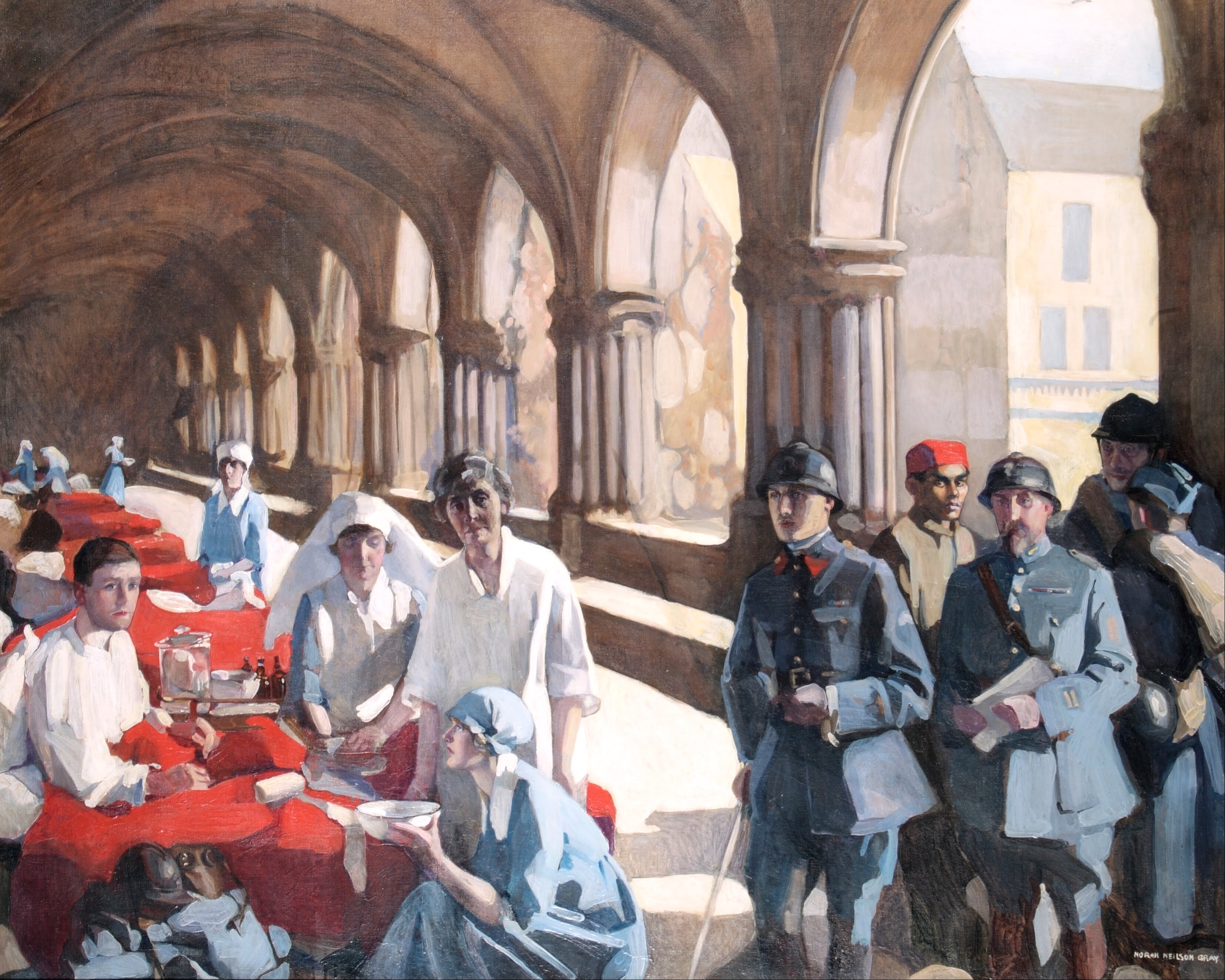
The Scottish Women's Hospital: In The Cloister of the Abbaye at Royaumont. Dr. Frances Ivens inspecting a French patient. Painting by Norah Neilson Gray, 1920

Gladys Miall-Smith (1888 – 3 January 1991) was a British medical doctor, and a notable campaigner in the fight to remove the marriage bar for women. During WW1, she was a doctor for the French Red Cross, and worked in the Scottish Women's Hospital at Royaumont 1918–19. She was the first doctor in Welwyn Garden City.

== Early life and education ==
Gladys Mary Miall-Smith was born in St. Pancras, London in 1888. Her parents were George Augustus Smith, a millinery warehouse man, and Hilda Caroline Smith (née Miall). Her mother, Hilda Caroline (born 1861) was a graduate of University College London and trained to teach at the Maria Grey Training College. She was also politically active for the Liberal and Labour parties, and a member of the London School Board. Miall-Smith was educated at the North London Collegiate School, where she was secretary of the debating society and a contributor to the school's magazine.

In 1914, having obtained her BSc at University College London and the London School of Medicine for Women, she was appointed to the Gilchrist Studentship for Women. The same year, as "part of her medical experience", she worked at a dressing station in France. After qualifying in 1916, Miall-Smith took up a post as House Surgeon at Great Ormond Street Hospital. On 26 June 1918, she returned to France to work at the Scottish Women's Hospital in Royaumont, where she remained until January 1919. Frances Ivens was then the hospital's Chief Medical Officer.

Following the war, Miall-Smith studied obstetrics at the Royal Free Hospital, becoming its House Physician and the Assistant Medical Officer for Maternity and Child Welfare for St. Pancras Borough Council. She took the Diplomate in Public Health in 1921, and married Hubert John Fry (a pathologist) in Paddington in the same year.

== Marriage and dismissal ==
In 1921, following her marriage to Dr John Fry, Miall-Smith received a letter anticipating her resignation as the Assistant Medical Officer for Maternity and Child Welfare with St. Pancras Borough Council. Miall-Smith refused to tender her resignation, citing the Sex Disqualification (Removal) Act 1919 and its stipulation that 'a person shall not be disqualified by sex or marriage from the exercise of any public function... or from entering or assuming or carrying on any civil profession or vocation.' Louise A. Jackson has noted that although strong support from all women within the profession might have been expected, the reality was more complicated:

Married medical women found themselves pitted against their single, often younger, peers, many of whom felt that their married colleagues, who 'had [their] living assured by [their] husbands' earnings', had 'no right to take posts which might otherwise fall to the lot of younger women who have to earn their own living'.

Miall-Smith did, however, receive support in the form of letters from (among others) the Women's Co-operative Guild, The Women's Local Government Society, the Council of the British Medical Association, the Society of Medical Officers of Health, the Federation of Medical Women, the National Association of Local Government Officers, and the London Society for Women's Service. Nevertheless, the decision was upheld. On 20 October 1921, The Times reported that the 'St. Pancras Borough Council last night decided, by 45 votes to three, to adhere to their decision dismissing Dr. Gladys Miall-Smith from her appointment as assistant medical officer for maternity.' The Medical Woman's Journal wrote:

"It appears that the council's decision is mainly based on the theory that, because there is widespread unemployment, married women whose husbands are able to support them should not compete in the labour market. This argument is ancient and musty and in respects an economic fallacy. The belief is that people with private means ought not to work because they "take the bread out of the mouth" of those who are compelled to work for a living... It is instructive to note that five women councillors attended the meeting, but only two voted in favour of the woman doctor."

The Women's Freedom League organised a protest meeting against the dismissal, held at the Working Men's College, with speakers including Louise McIlroy, Winifred Cullis, Helena Normanton, Agnes Dawson, and Leslie Burgin. The following year, St. Pancras appointed Dr. Stella Churchill to replace Miall-Smith. Normanton, writing to The Woman's Leader, criticised this decision, noting that in hiring a widow "St. Pancras has now obtained precisely what it wanted all along - a woman celibate." Normanton believed that "as long as Dr. Miall-Smith's shameful dismissal stands unredressed and unvindicated, so long do all women stand rebuked and humiliated; and the marriage state dishonoured."

Influenced in part by Miall-Smith's case, as well as other examples of married women's dismissals, the Medical Women's Federation established the Standing Committee for the Defence of Married Medical Women. They requested an amendment to the Sex Disqualification (Removal) Act, but were working against prevailing societal attitudes towards working married women. The situation continued for many years following Miall-Smith's dismissal.

== Welwyn Garden City ==
In 1922, Dr. Gladys Miall-Smith and her husband Dr. Hubert John Fry went to the growing town of Welwyn Garden City (founded 1920), becoming the town's first doctors, working mostly alongside volunteers. In Welwyn Garden City, Miall-Smith became 'a much respected GP with a special interest in women & children.' In the year of their arrival, Miall-Smith and Fry formed the town's Health Council (with Dr. C. H. Furnival), creating provision for first aid and infant care. She established its first infant welfare clinic, where she was medical officer, and the couple instituted an insurance scheme for patients in 1924 to support their medical care. Alongside others, including the wife of Richard Reiss, Miall-Smith 'worked tirelessly to improve health standards in the town,' before the introduction of the National Health Service in 1948, and afterwards.

Miall-Smith was widowed in 1930, when Hubert Fry died from blood poisoning after scratching himself while carrying out a post-mortem examination. They had three children.

== Retirement and death ==
Following her retirement, Miall-Smith travelled widely, rendering service in maternity hospitals in Ghana and Zimbabwe. Gladys Miall-Smith died 3 January 1991 in Northampton. She was 102.
