= List of Légion d'honneur recipients by name (I) =

The French government gives out the Legion of Honour awards, to both French and foreign nationals, based on a recipient's exemplary services rendered to France, or to the causes supported by France. This award is divided into five distinct categories (in ascending order), i.e. three ranks: Knight, Officer, Commander, and two titles: Grand Officer and Grand Cross. Knight is the most common and is awarded for either at least 20 years of public service or acts of military or civil bravery. The rest of the categories have a quota for the number of years of service in the category below before they can be awarded. The Officer rank requires a minimum of eight years as a Knight, and the Commander, the highest civilian category for a non-French citizen, requires a minimum of five years as an Officer. The Grand Officer and the Grand Cross are awarded only to French citizens, and each requires three years' service in their respective immediately lower rank. The awards are traditionally published and promoted on 14 July.

The following is a non-exhaustive list of recipients of the Legion of Honour awards, since the first ceremony in May 1803. 2,550 individuals can be awarded the insignia every year. The total number of awards is close to 1 million (estimated at 900,000 in 2021, including over 3,000 Grand Cross recipients), with some 92,000 recipients alive today. Only until 2008 was gender parity achieved amongst the yearly list of recipients, with the total number of women recipients since the award's establishment being only 59 at the end of the second French empire and only 26,000 in 2021.

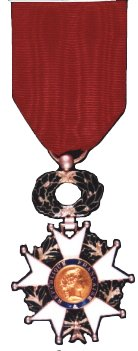

Recipient	Dates (birth – death)	General work & reason for the recognition	Award category (date)
Khalil Ibrahim Pasha	1957 – 2011	Sudanese insurgent leader who was the founder of the Justice and Equality Movement (JEM).	TBA
Jean Ichbiah	1940 – 2007	French computer scientist	Knight (1979)
René Iché	1897 – 1954	20th-century French sculptor	TBA
Idris	1890 – 1983	Libyan political and religious leader, who served as the emirate and then the King of Libya.	Knight (TBA); Officer (TBA); Commander (TBA); Grand Officer (TBA); Grand Cross (TBA)
Toomas Hendrik Ilves	1953 – Present	Estonian politician, and fourth president of Estonia.	Knight (TBA); Officer (TBA); Commander (2001)
Im Kwon-taek	1934 – Present	South Korean film director.	Knight (30 November 2007)
Sofia Imber	1924 – 2017	Romanian-born Venezuelan journalist and supporter of the arts.	Knight (TBA)
Daniel Inouye	1924 – 2012	American lawyer and politician who served as a United States senator from Hawaii.	Knight (6 November 2007)
Edmund Ironside, 1st Baron Ironside	1880 – 1959	Senior British Army officer who served as Imperial General Staff Chief during the first year of the World War II.	Knight (TBA); Officer (TBA); Commander (TBA); Grand Officer (TBA); Grand Cross (1946)
Bidzina Ivanishvili	1956 – Present	Georgian politician, businessman, philanthropist and former Prime Minister of Georgia.	Knight (31 December 2020)
Frances Ivens	1870 – 1944	Obstetrician and gynaecological surgeon. Recognised for her services to the French forces at Royaumont.	Knight (TBA)

== See also ==
- Legion of Honour
- List of Legion of Honour recipients by name
- List of foreign recipients of Legion of Honour by name
- List of foreign recipients of the Legion of Honour by country
- List of British recipients of the Legion of Honour for the Crimean War
- Legion of Honour Museum
- Ribbons of the French military and civil awards
- War Cross (France)
