= Ring Around Quartet =

Italian vocal quartet

The Ring Around Quartet is an Italian vocal quartet active in early music.

The Ring Around Quartet was founded in Genoa in 1993 by Vera Marenco and Umberto Bartolini. As of June 2015 the members are Vera Marenco (Soprano), Umberto Bartolini (Tenor), Manuela Litro (Alto) and Alberto Longhi (Baritone).

Throughout their career they have been having an intense concert activity in Italy and abroad, including cities like Milano, Roma, Palermo, Florence, Bergamo, Algers, Marseille, Torino, Reggio Emilia, Udine and many others. They performed in music festivals including the Teatro La Fenice of Venice, the Associazione Musicale Etnea in Catania, the Festival dei Due Mondi in Spoleto, the Early Music Centre Pietà De’ Turchini in Naples, the Bologna Festival, the musical Season at the Royaumont Abbey (Paris), the Accademia Filarmonica in Messina, the Filarmonica Bologna, the Società Filarmonica di Trento.

The ensemble performed more than once at the concerts at Palazzo del Quirinale in Rome, which have been broadcast live on the Italian national radio RAI Radio 3.

Their recordings include "Frottole", in which the vocal group is accompanied by an instrumental consort, published by Naxos Records in May 2015.

== Discography ==
- Musiche per Van Dyck, 1997, Rivoalto, republished in 2013 Newton Classics
- Volgete gli occhi a tante meraviglie, 2004, Philarmonia
- Gioco di Voci, 2004, Philarmonia
- Natale in Canto, 2008, Musicaround
- Frottole, 2015, Naxos Records
