= Tina Gray =

Scottish medical pioneer and sister of artist Norah Nielson Gray

- Born: 1885; Helensburgh, Scotland
- Died: 26 June 1985 (aged 99–100)
- Education: Glasgow School of Art; University of Glasgow
- Occupation: surgeon
- Years active: 1914–1946
- Known for: Glasgow Royal Infirmary

Tina Gray (1885 – 26 June 1985) was a medical pioneer and the sister of 'Glasgow Girl' Norah Neilson Gray.

== Family life ==
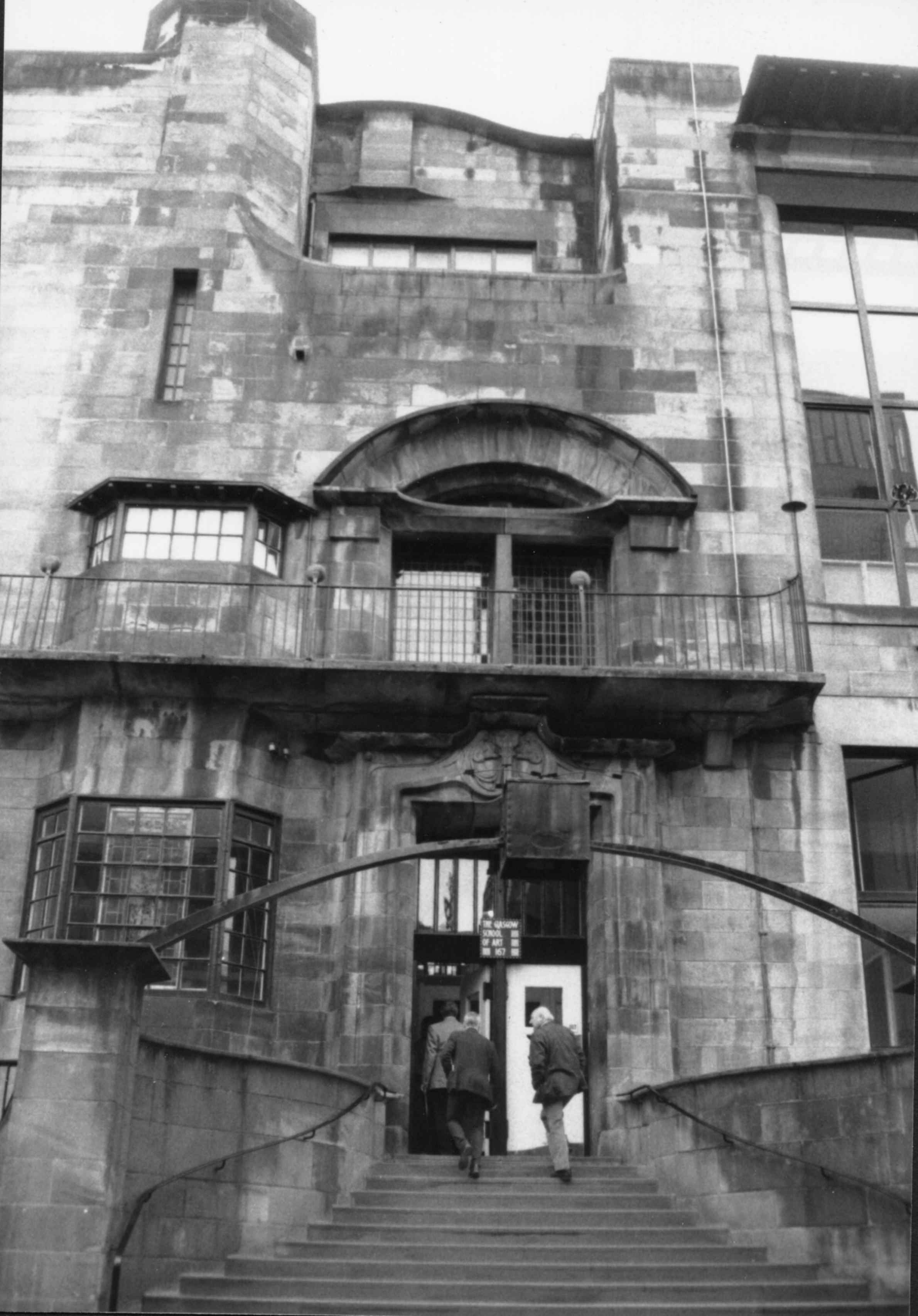
the Glasgow School of Art

Tina Gray was born in Helensburgh, one of the seven children of Norah Neilson and George Gray, a ship owner in Glasgow. During Gray's childhood the family enjoyed some affluence however, the shipping industry suffered badly following World War I and the family's wealth declined as a result. Gray was homeschooled, and went on to study drawing and painting at the Glasgow School of Art from 1901–1903. Her sister, the 'Glasgow Girl' Norah Neilson Gray, also studied at the Glasgow School of Art and was international recognised until her death in 1931.

== Career ==
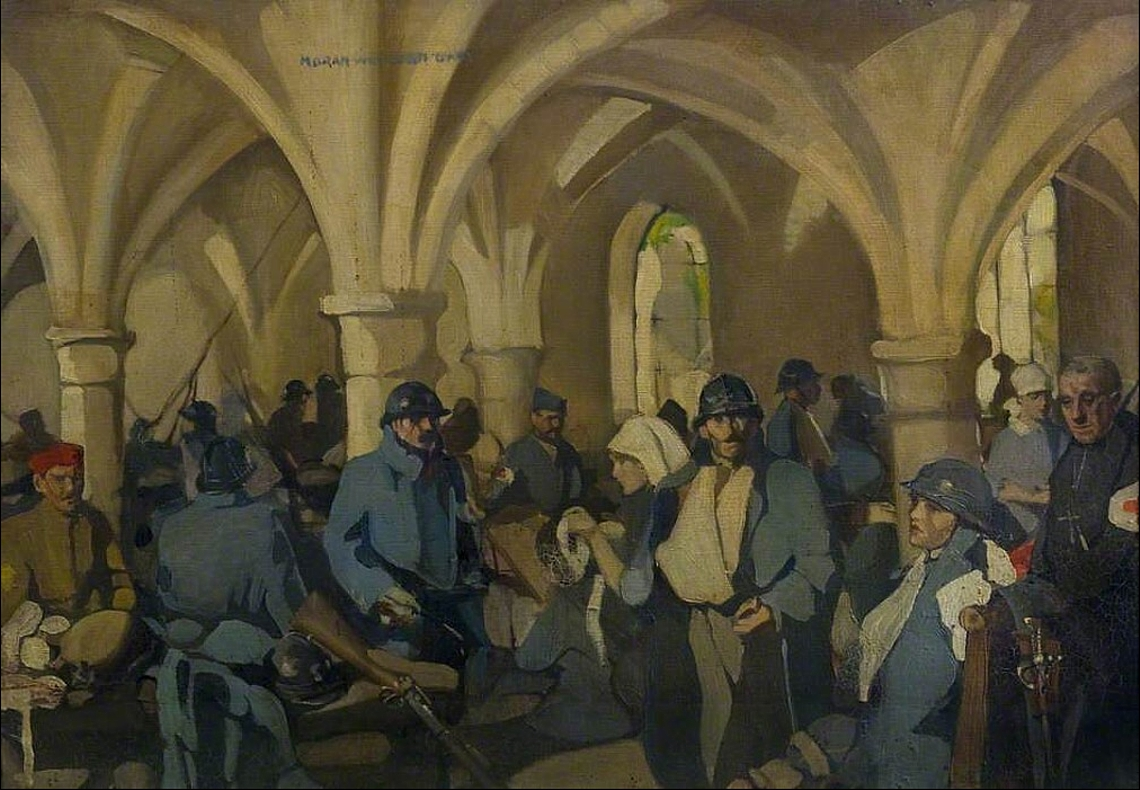
A painting of a military hospital by Gray's sister, Norah Neilson Gray

Gray, like her sister, volunteered during World War I. While Gray's sister volunteered with the suffragist-affiliated Scottish Women's Hospitals, Gray volunteered as a nurse with the British Red Cross. She was based at the 25th stationary hospital in Rouen, a British military hospital for infectious diseases, where she was awarded of one scarlet stripe.

In 1925, Gray graduated from the University of Glasgow aged 41 with a medical degree and eventually became the assistant surgeon at the Glasgow Royal Infirmary. She was one of only two female senior surgeons in Scotland at that time.

During World War II, Gray was appointed as a surgeon at Dunfermline and Stonehouse hospitals. Gray retired from Glasgow Royal Infirmary in 1946, and remained at Stonehouse until late 1947.

== Personal life ==
Gray was a member of the Glasgow and West of Scotland Lady Artists' Society (elected 1939). She died aged 100 in 1985.
