= Célestin Sieur =

French physician (1860–1955)

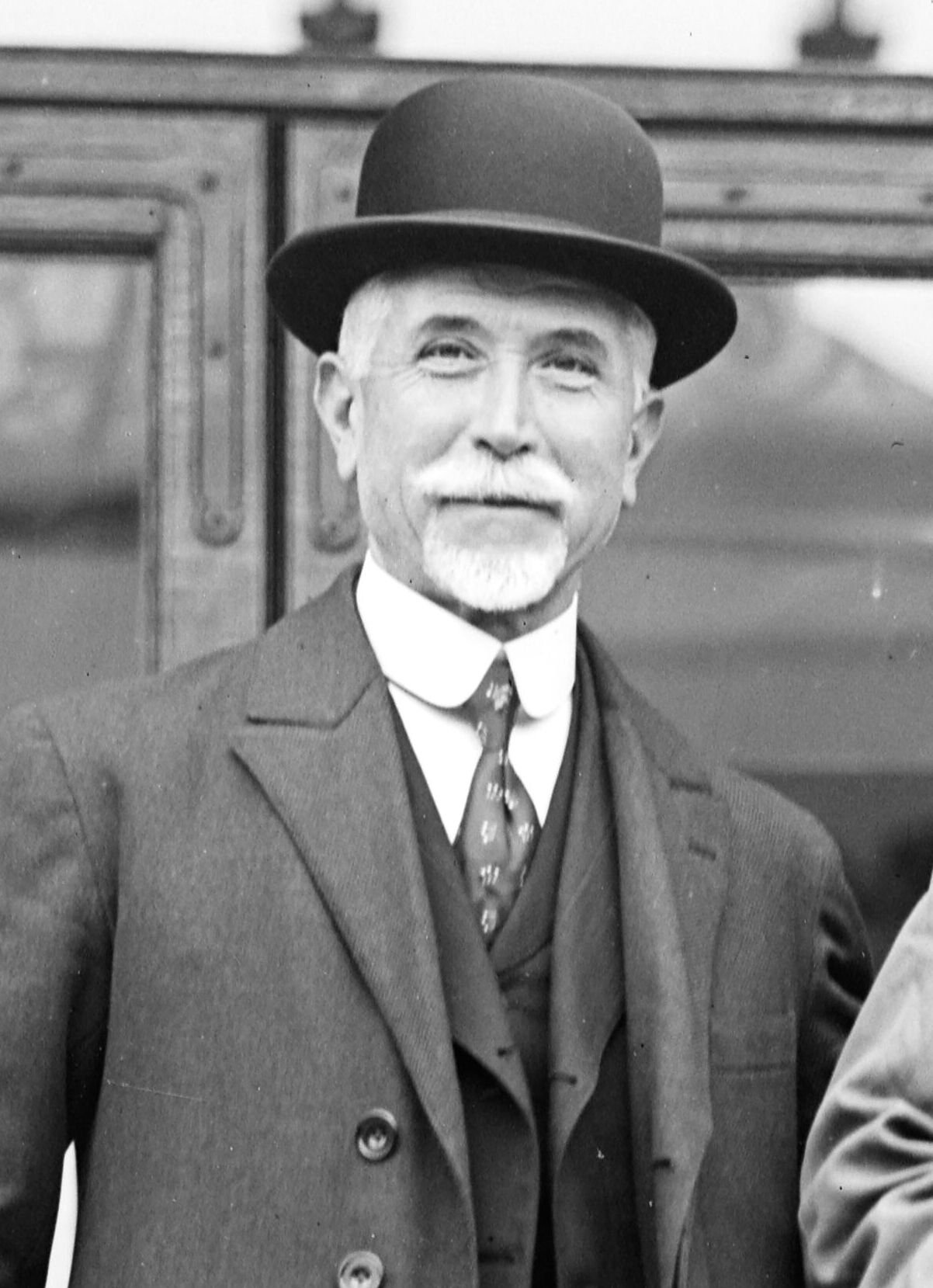
- Célestin Sieur (1923)
- Born: 27 December 1860; La Chapelle-en-Lafaye, France
- Died: 12 June 1955 (aged 94); Paris, France
- Education: University of Bordeaux
- Known for: Sieur's sign
- Scientific career
- Fields: Medicine

Célestin Sieur (La Chapelle-en-Lafaye, 27 December 1860 – Paris, 12 June 1955) was a French physician specializing in ENT surgery. The Sieur's sign is named after him.
