= Norah Neilson Gray =

Scottish artist and WWI nurse (1882–1931)

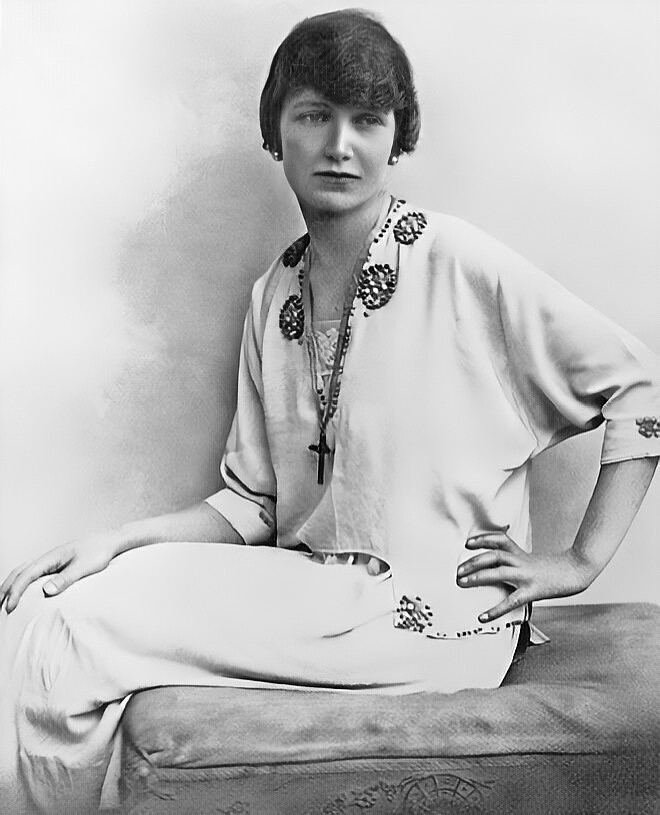
- Self portrait (1918)
- Born: 16 June 1882; Helensburgh, Scotland
- Died: 27 May 1931 (aged 48); Glasgow, Scotland
- Education: Glasgow School of Art
- Occupations: artist, portrait painter
- Known for: portraits

Norah Neilson Gray (16 June 1882 – 27 May 1931) was a Scottish artist of the Glasgow School. She first exhibited at the Royal Academy while still a student and then showed works regularly at the Paris Salon and with the Royal Academy of Scotland. She was a member of The Glasgow Girls whose paintings were exhibited in Kirkcudbright during July and August 2010.

== Early life ==
Gray was born at Carisbrook, West King Street in Helensburgh in 1882 to Norah Neilson, who was from a Falkirk auctioneering family, and George Gray, a Glasgow ship owner. She was first privately taught by two local art teachers, Misses Park and Ross, at a studio at Craigendoran, outside Helensburgh. Then in 1901, Gray moved with her family to Glasgow so that she could attend Glasgow School of Art (GSA) which she did until 1906. She trained under the Belgian artist Jean Delville and the Scottish painter Fra Newbery. In 1905, while still a student, Gray had her portrait of her sister Gerty accepted for display at the Royal Academy in London. She taught fashion-plate drawing at GSA from 1906.

Gray also taught at St Columba's School, Kilmacolm which at the time was a girls' school. Gray was said to have been nicknamed "Purple Patch", because of her insistence that colours could be seen in shadows if you looked correctly. By 1910, Gray was regularly exhibiting portraits at the Royal Academy, the Royal Glasgow Institute of the Fine Arts and at the Paris Salon. She had her own studio at Bath Street in Glasgow and held her first solo exhibition at Warneuke's Gallery in Glasgow.

In 1914, Gray was elected a member of the Royal Scottish Society of Painters in Watercolour and illustrated a volume of work by Wordsworth. Gray adopted a pointillist technique for her 1914 painting, The Missing Trawler now in the collection of Kelvingrove Art Gallery and Museum.

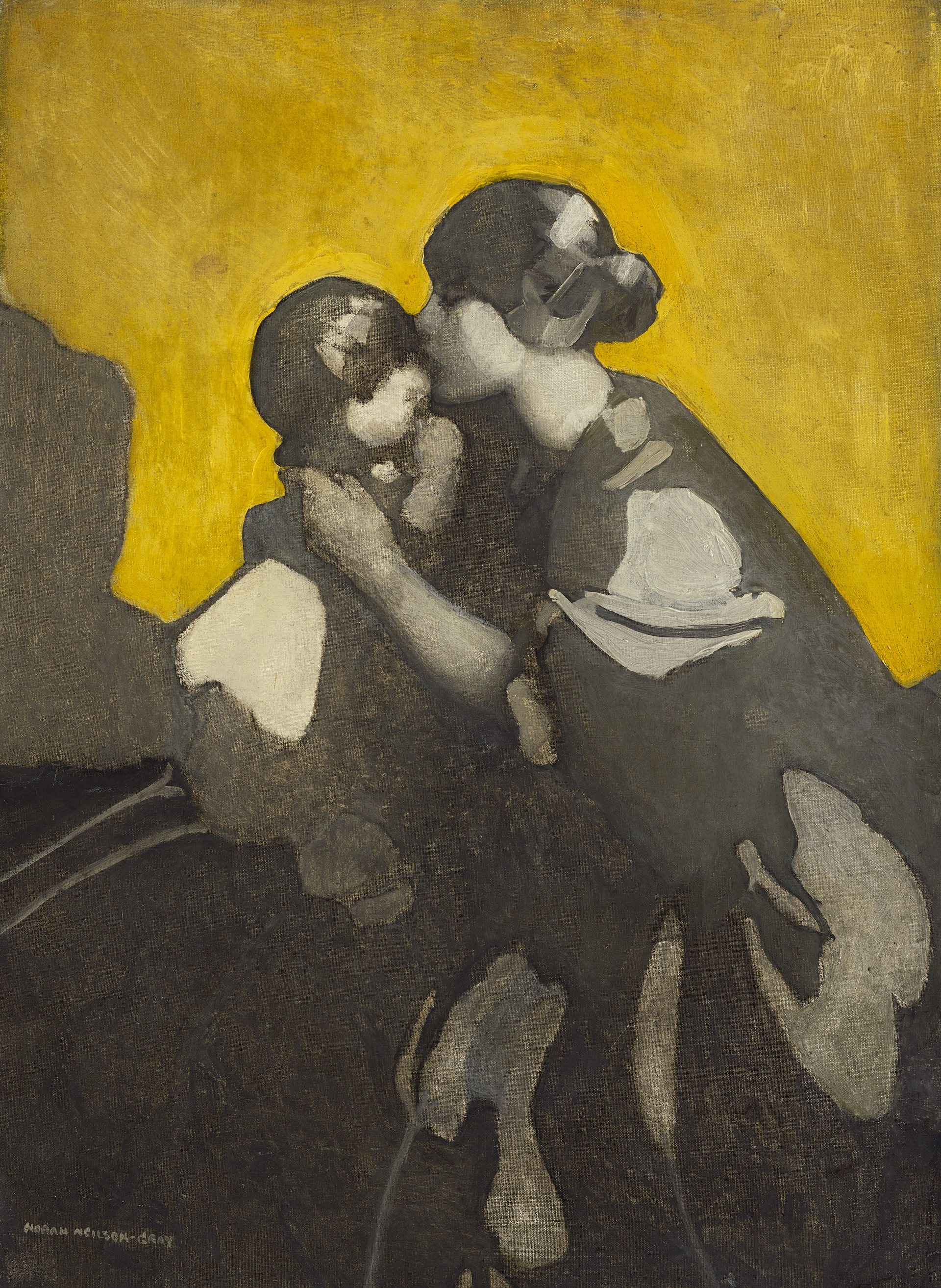
Mother and Child

== World War One ==
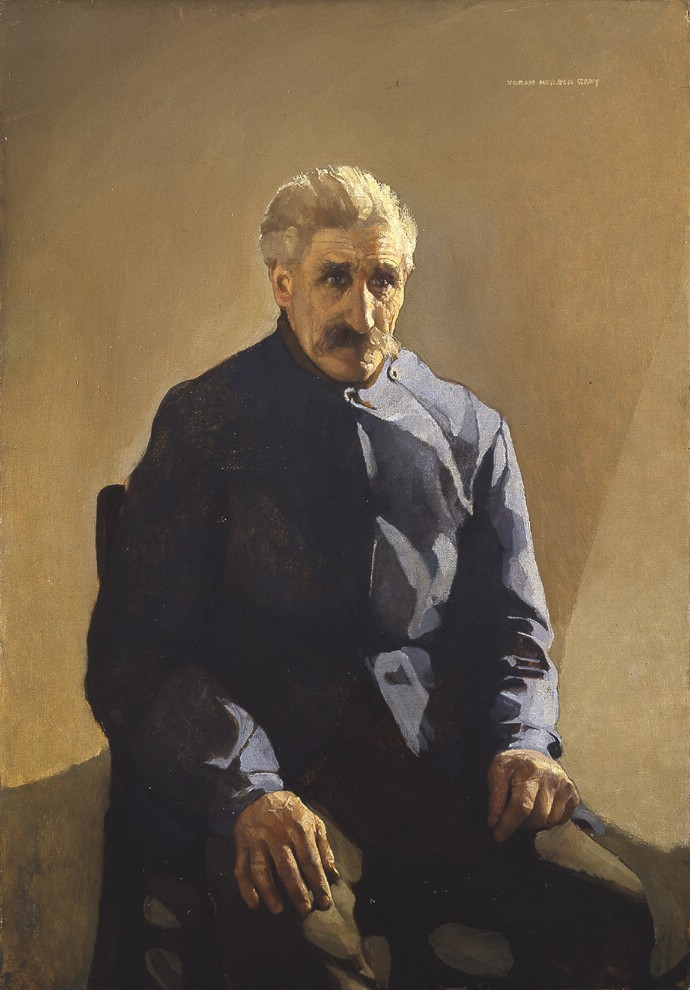
The Belgian in Exile

During World War I Gray produce some of her most notable work. The Country's Charge, from 1915, depicts a woman and child wrapped in a shawl. The painting was shown at the Royal Academy and sold for the benefit of the Red Cross and then donated to the Royal Free Hospital. Her painting The Belgian in Exile, which was completed in 1915, shows a Belgian refugee from Liège who had fled to Scotland after his country was invaded. The painting was shown in Glasgow in 1916, at the Royal Academy in 1917 and at the Paris Salon in 1921 where it was awarded the bronze medal.

During the War, Gray volunteered as a nurse with the Scottish Women's Hospitals and was sent to France where she also found time to paint and sketch. A painting Hôpital Auxilaire 1918 from that time was offered to the Imperial War Museum but the Women's Work Sub-committee of the Museum refused to accept it and requested a painting showing Miss Frances Ivens and other women involved in the care of wounded French soldiers. Hôpital Auxilaire 1918 shows the vaulted 13th-century Royaumont Abbaye, near Paris, where women had organised a hospital to treat the casualties of the war. The hospital was staffed by Scottish Women's Hospitals, under the direction of the French Red Cross. Her second painting of Royaumont Abbaye, entitled The Scottish Women's Hospital In The Cloister of the Abbaye at Royaumont. Dr Frances Ivens inspecting a French patient was accepted by the IWM in 1920.

== Later life ==
After World War I, Gray returned to her work as a portraitist, most commonly painting young women and children. In 1923, Gray won the silver medal at the Paris Salon for her painting Le Jeune Fille. Gray was chosen to be the first woman to join the influential hanging committee of the Royal Glasgow Institute of the Fine Arts.

On 27 May 1931, Gray died of cancer in Glasgow, aged 48.

== Legacy ==
Gray's paintings are in several national collections. From June to August 2010, there was an exhibition of the Glasgow Girls who, together with the boys, made up the Glasgow School. Gray's paintings were included in the exhibition at Kirkcudbright Town Hall. The painting Little Brother is held at the Kelvingrove Art Gallery. In 1978 her sister, Tina, left Hôpital Auxilaire 1918 to Helensburgh on the condition that a permanent place be found to exhibit it. The painting now hangs in the town's library.

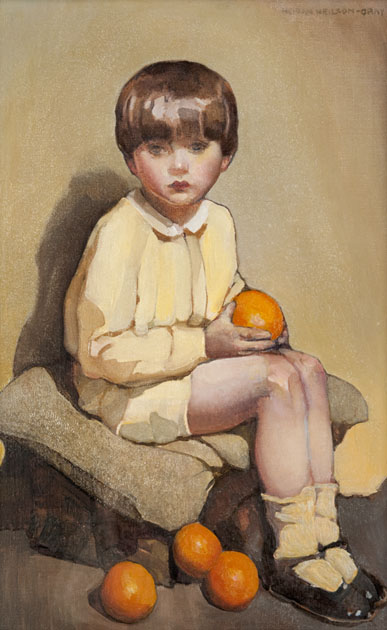
Little Boy with Oranges
