= Royaumont Abbey =

Abbey in Val-d'Oise, France

Coordinates: 49°8′51″N 2°22′55″E

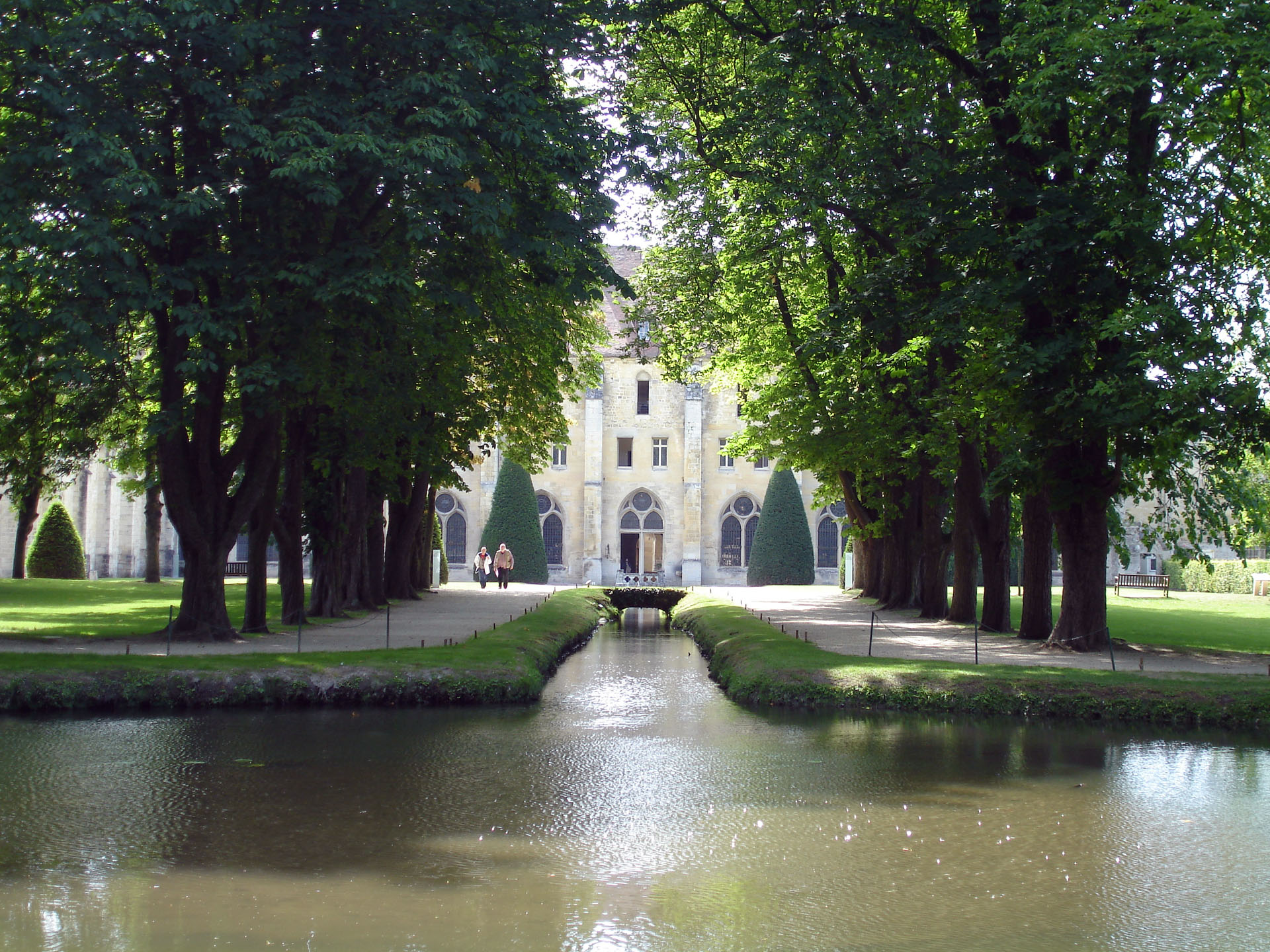
View of the abbey

Royaumont Abbey is a former Cistercian abbey, located near Asnières-sur-Oise in Val-d'Oise, approximately 30 km north of Paris, France.

== History ==
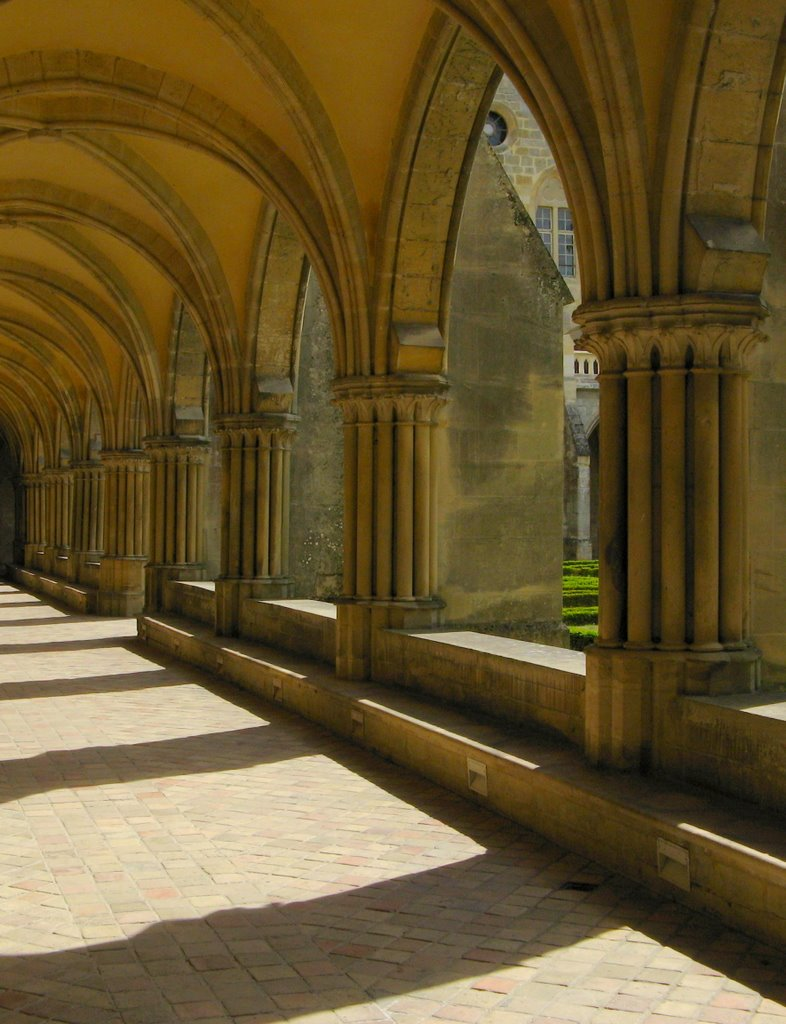
Cloister of Royaumont Abbey

It was built between 1228 and 1235 with the support of Louis IX. A proclamation by Louis IX stated that royal children were to be interred at Royaumont. The thirteenth century encyclopedist Vincent of Beauvais was a brother at the Abbey as well.

The abbey was dissolved in 1791 during the French Revolution and the stones were partly used to build a factory. However, the sacristy, cloister, and refectory remained intact.

In 1836 and 1838, respectively, two operas by German composer Friedrich von Flotow opened at Royaumont—Sérafine and Le Comte de Saint-Mégrin.

In the early 20th century, the abbey was bought by the Goüin family who in 1964 created the Royaumont Foundation, the first private French cultural foundation. Today, the abbey is a tourist attraction and also serves as a cultural centre.

=== World War I ===
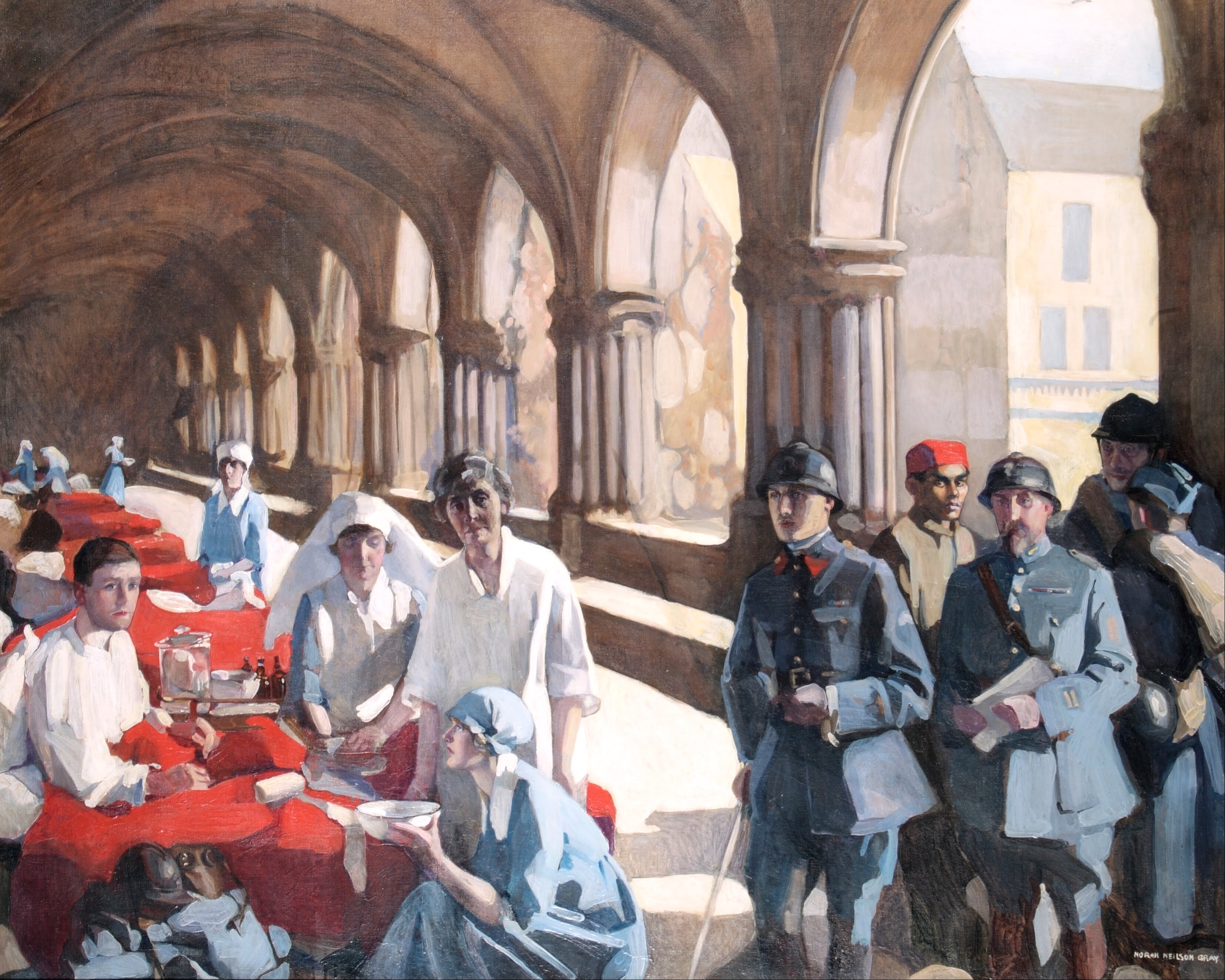
Dr Frances Ivens inspecting a French patient at Royaumont. Painting by Norah Neilson Gray.

From January 1915 to March 1919, the Abbey was turned into a voluntary hospital, Hôpital Auxiliaire 301, operated by Scottish Women's Hospitals(SWH), under the direction of the French Red Cross. It was especially noted for its performance treating soldiers involved in the Battle of the Somme. After the war the Chief Medical Officer, Miss Frances Ivens CBE MS(Lond) ChM(Liverp) FRGOG (1870–1944), was awarded membership of the Légion d'honneur.

== Royaumont Abbey in popular culture ==
The novel In Falling Snow by Australian writer Mary-Rose MacColl (first published in Oct. 2012) is set at Royaumont during the time when it was a military hospital and refers to historical figures like Ms Ivens. The novel A Good Woman by Danielle Steel (first published in Oct. 2008) also includes multiple chapters set at the Abbey during the war.

The abbey was used as a filming location for the Catholic boarding school in Jean Delannoy's Les amitiés particulières.

On 15 June 1971, Pink Floyd performed live at the abbey in front of an audience at the invitation of the Daudy family, the abbey's current owners.

== Gallery ==
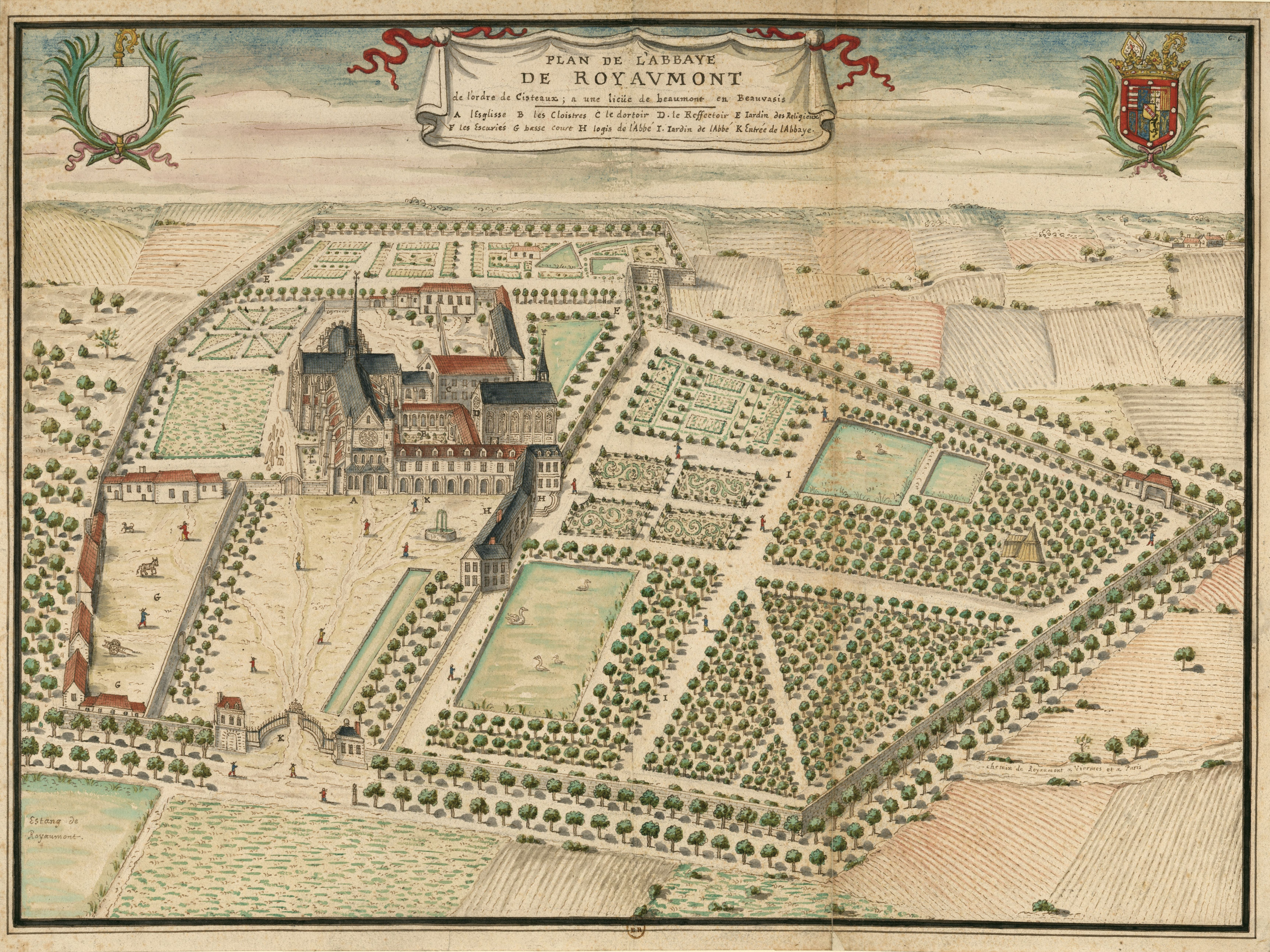
Overview of the abbey around 1700

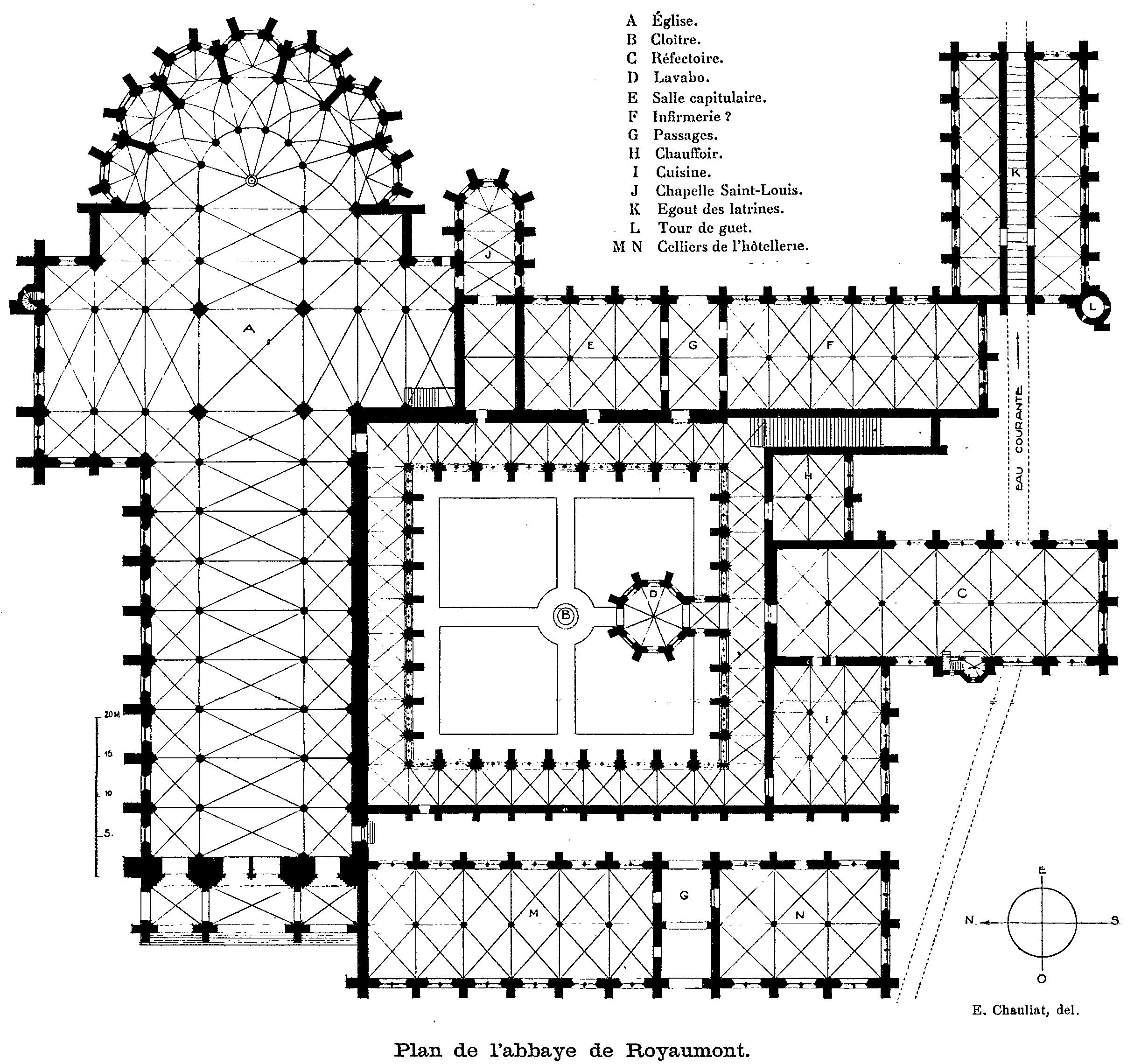
Plan of Royaumont before 1791 with the church ("A") still intact

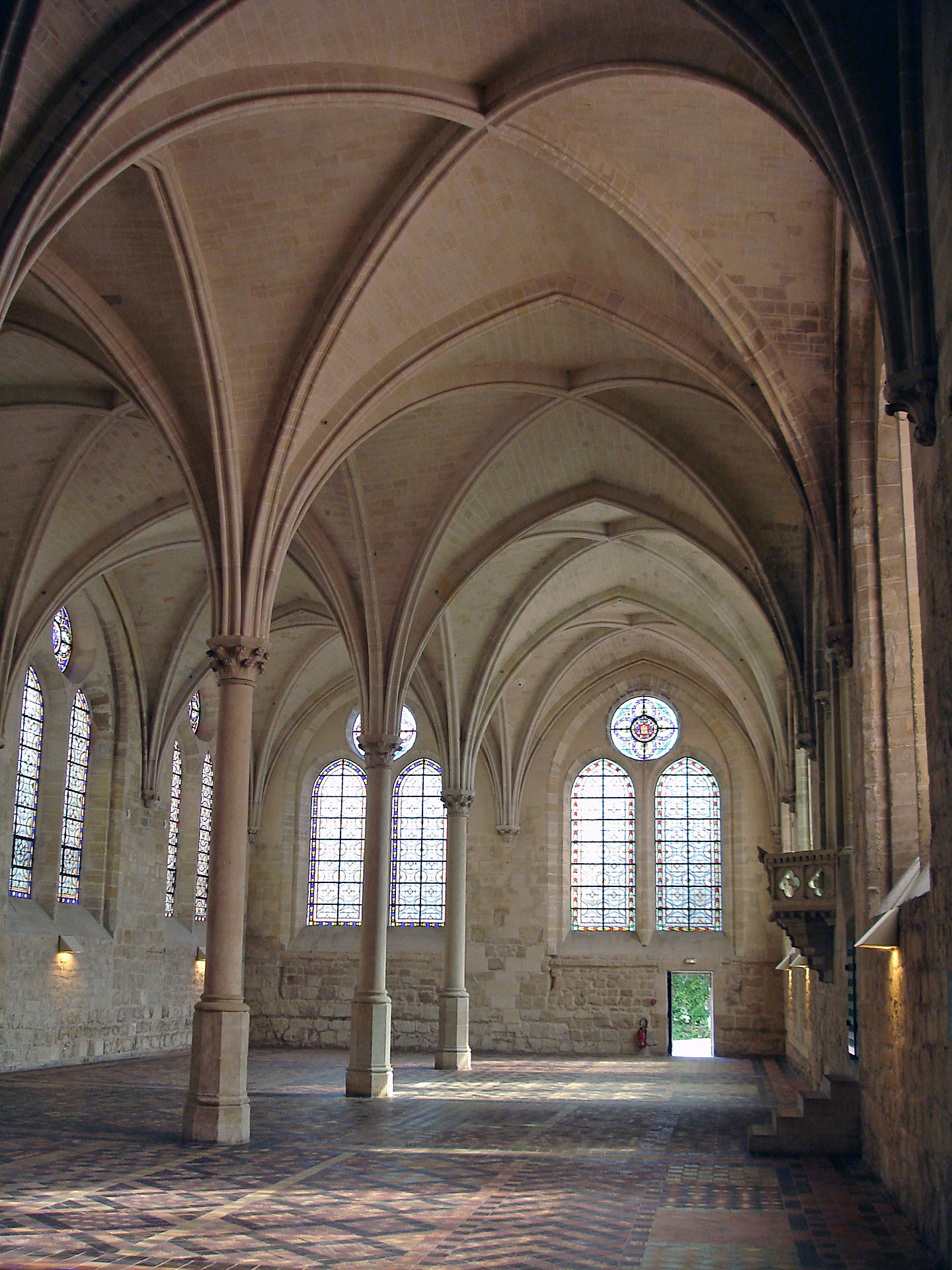
Refectory

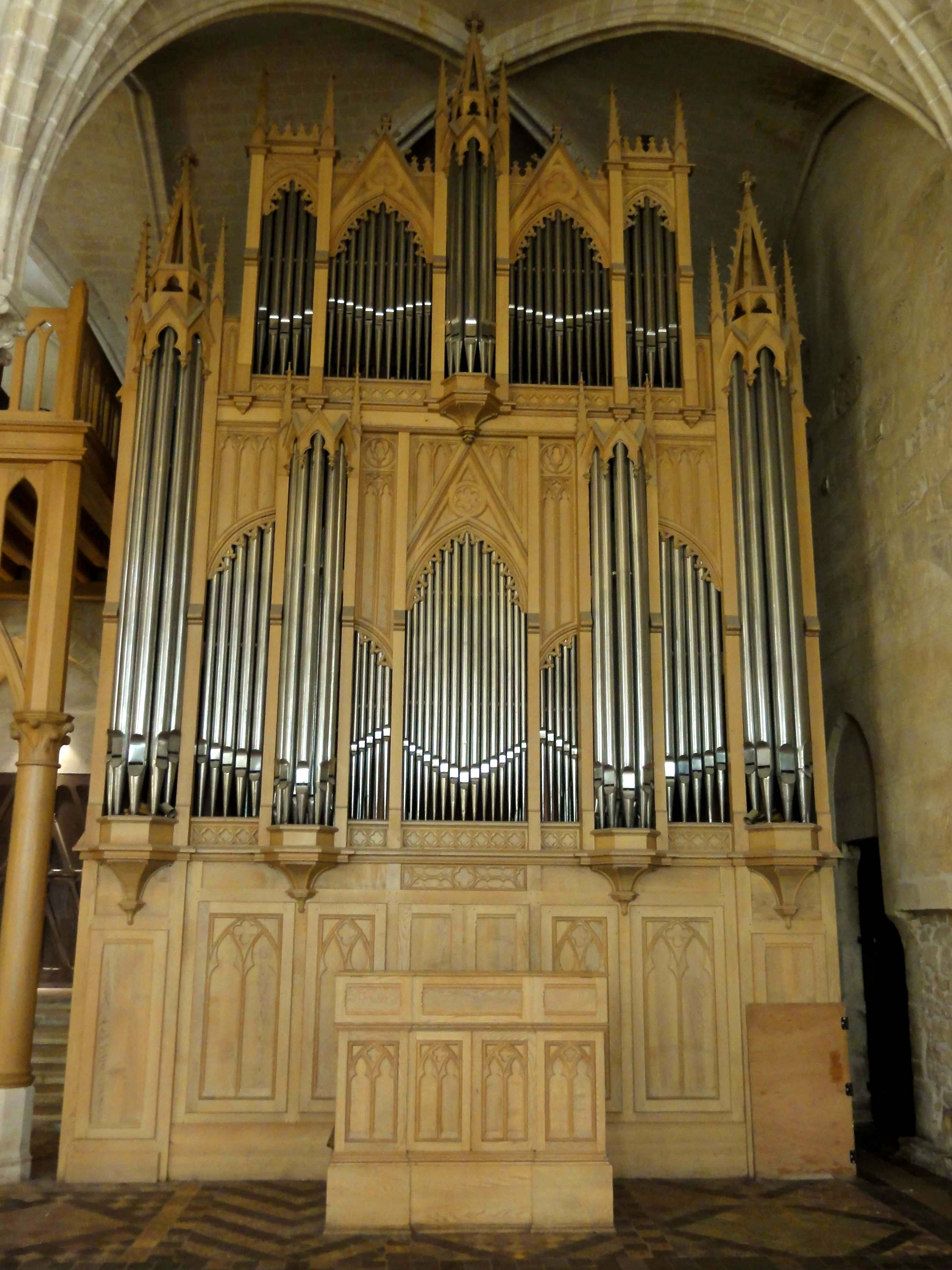
Pipe organ in the refectory

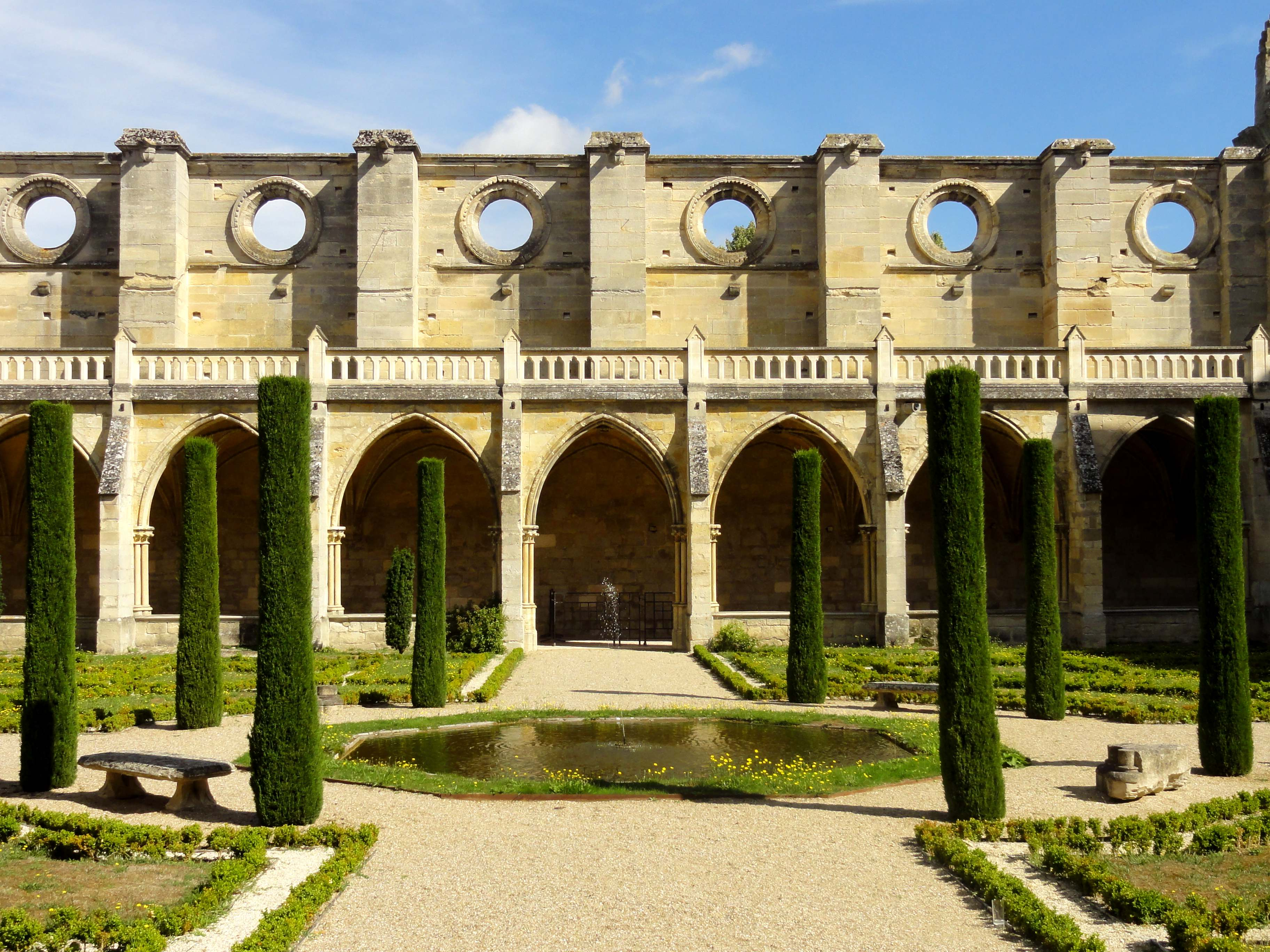
Cloister

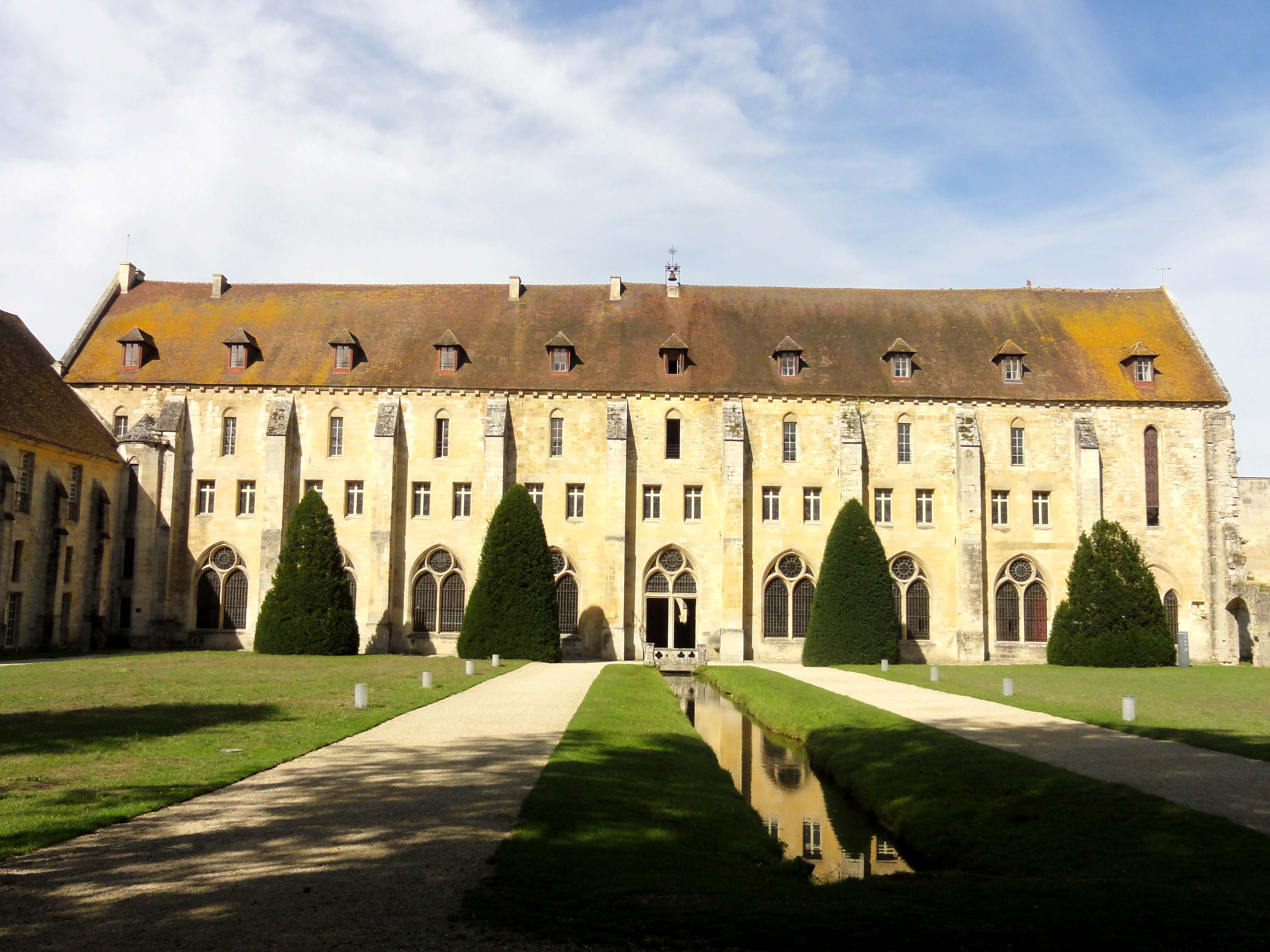
Entrance

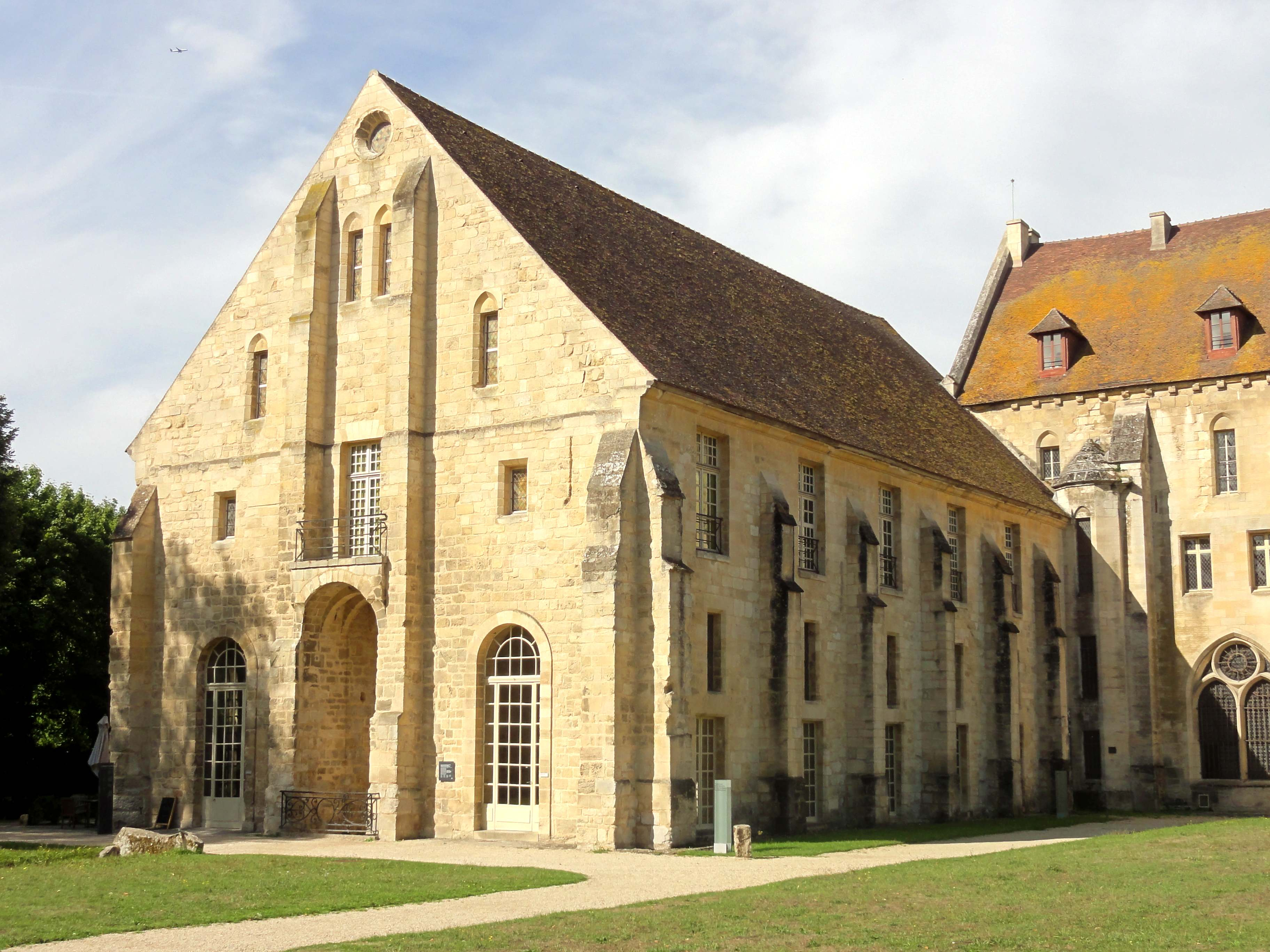
Latrine building

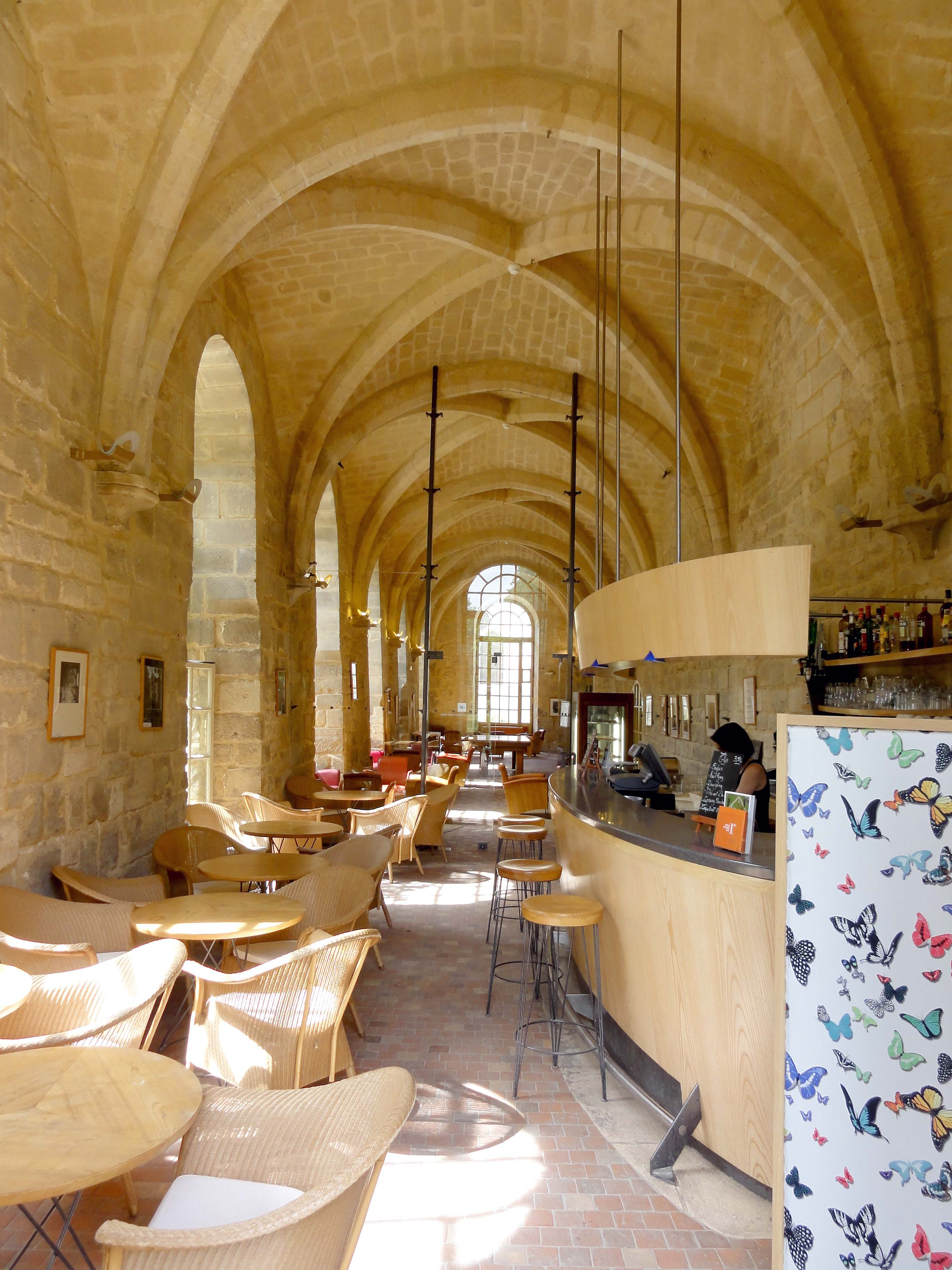
Latrine building, inside

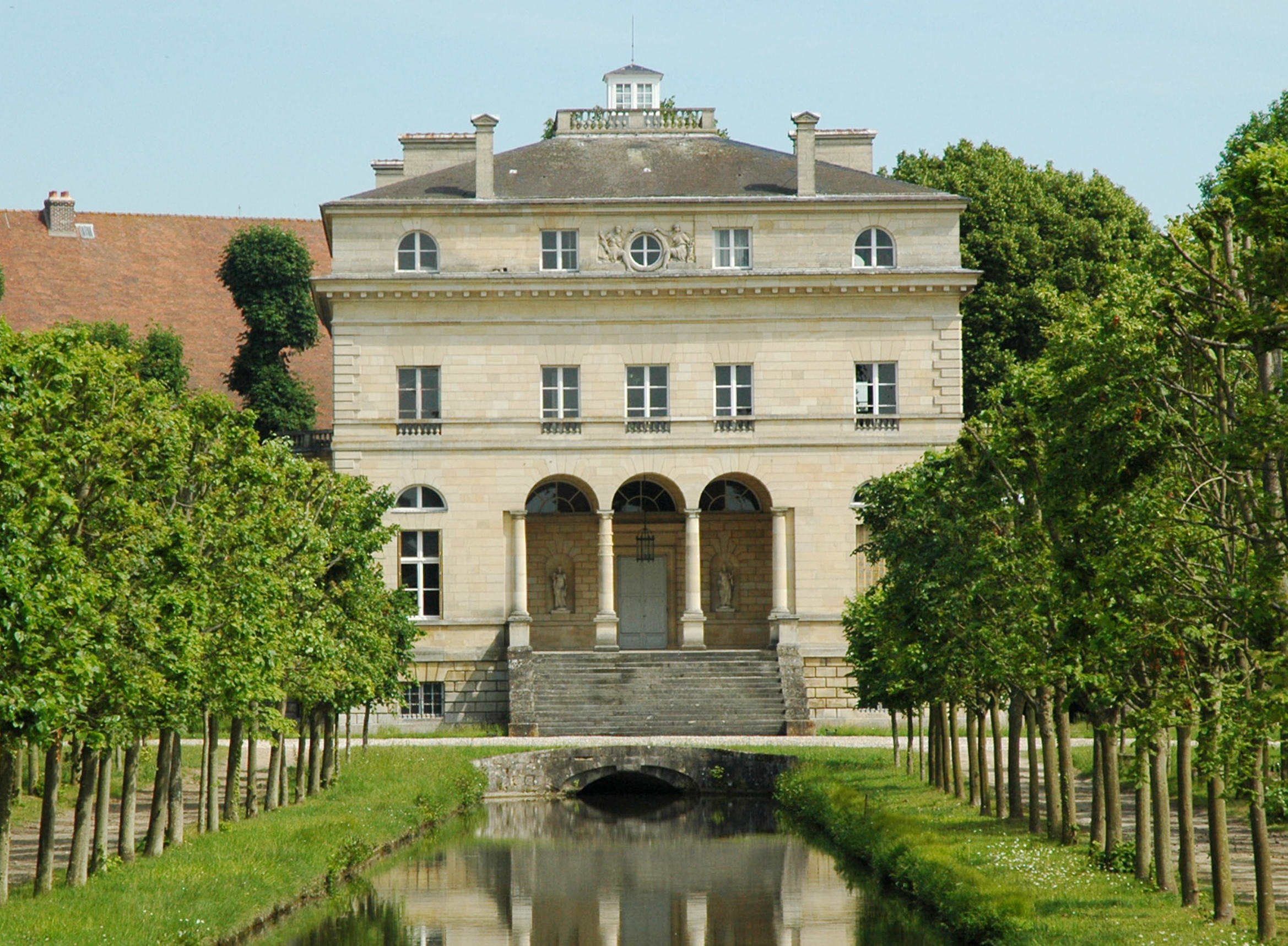
Palais abbatial

== Sources ==
- Suger (2018). Selected Works of Abbot Suger of Saint Denis. Translated by Cusimano, Richard; Whitmore, Eric. The Catholic University of America Press.
