= Frances Ivens =

British physician 1870-1944

Frances Ivens CBE FRCOG
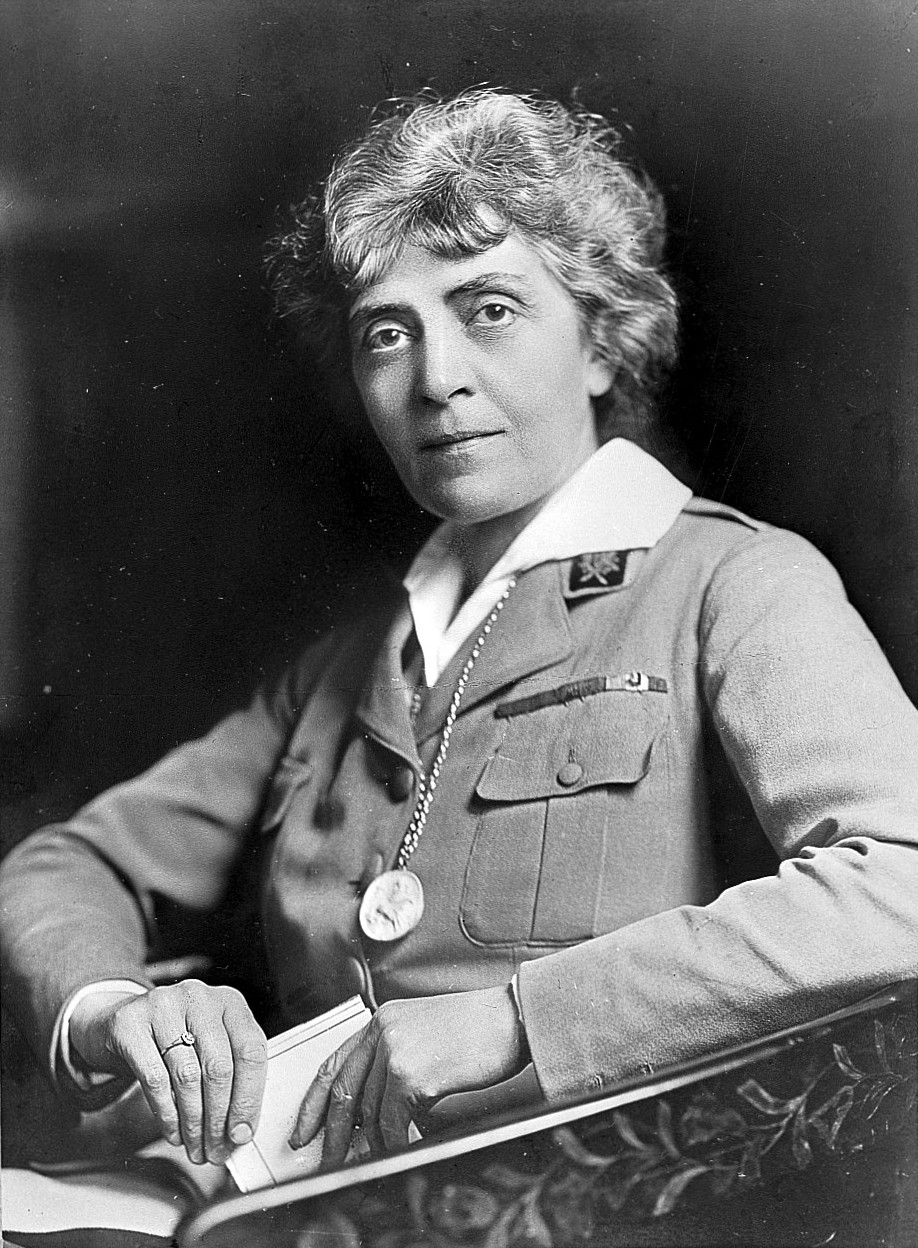
- Ivens as chief medical officer at Royaumont
- Born: Mary Hannah Frances Ivens; 1870; Little Harborough, England
- Died: 6 February 1944 (aged 73–74); Killagorden, St Clement, Cornwall, England
- Occupations: obstetrician gynaecologist
- Known for: Work at Scottish Women's Hospital, Royaumont during First World War

Mary Hannah Frances Ivens CBE FRCOG (1870 – 6 February 1944) was an obstetrician and gynaecologist who was the first woman appointed to a hospital consultant post in Liverpool. During the First World War she was chief medical officer at the Scottish Women's Hospital at Royaumont, northeast of Paris. For her services to the French forces she was awarded a knighthood in France's Legion of Honour and the Croix de Guerre.

== Early life and education ==
Ivens was born in Little Harborough, near Rugby, Warwickshire in 1870, the 5th child of farmer Elizabeth Ashmole (1840–1880) and her husband, William Ivens (1830–1905), farmer and timber merchant.

Ivens entered the London School of Medicine for Women in 1894 at the age of 24, doing her clinical studies at the Royal Free Hospital. She qualified in 1900 with the gold medal in obstetrics and honours in medicine and forensic medicine. In 1902, Ivens qualified MB BS (Bachelor of Medicine and Surgery) with first class honours. In 1903 she obtained the degree of Master of Surgery (MS). She had further postgraduate experience in obstetrics and gynaecology in Dublin and Vienna followed by seven years' surgical experience in London at the Royal Free Hospital, the Elizabeth Garrett Anderson Hospital (New Hospital for Women) in London, and the Canning Town Mission Hospital for Women in East London.

== Liverpool 1907–1914 ==
In 1907, Ivens was appointed gynaecological surgeon to a new unit in the Liverpool Stanley Hospital. She was the first woman to hold an honorary post in a Liverpool hospital. Beds had been specially endowed on the condition that they should be in the care of a woman practitioner. Here she built up a large gynaecological out-patient department. Later she was also appointed honorary surgeon to the Liverpool Samaritan Hospital. In Liverpool she fought to have more women appointed to hospital posts, and became a leading member of the North of England Medical Women's Society. She was active in the suffrage movement and was chair of the Liverpool branch of the Conservative and Unionist Women's Suffrage Society.

== Surgeon at Royaumont ==
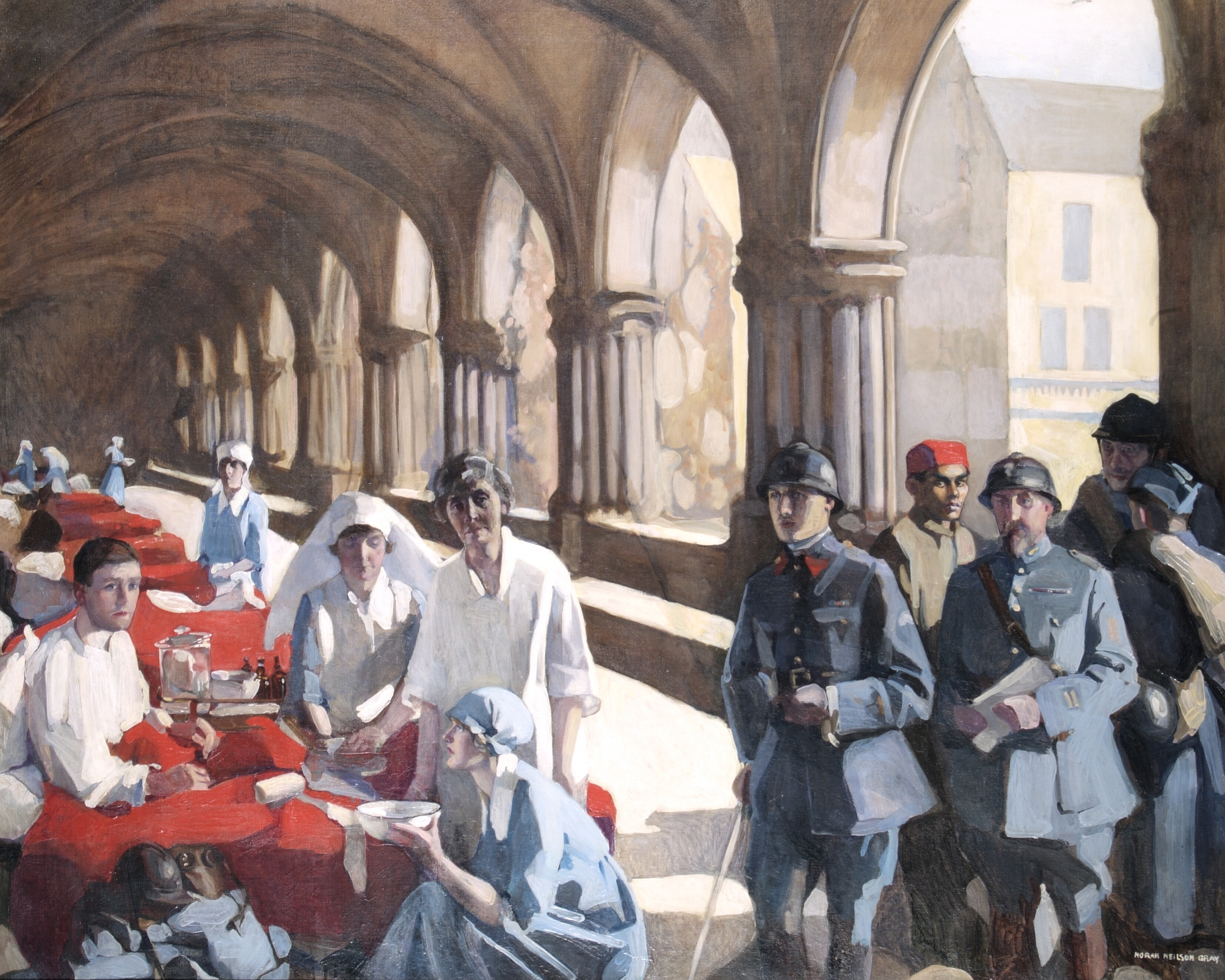
Frances Ivens inspecting wounded French soldiers in Royaumont, painted by Norah Neilson Gray (1920)

In December 1914, Ivens volunteered to serve in France as head of the unit of the Scottish Women's Hospital, which was established in the Abbaye de Royaumont under the French Red Cross. She saw the war as an opportunity to demonstrate what women could achieve in the medical field. Before the war, as her practice was confined to women and children, Ivens had not treated men. Nor had she any experience of treating battle casualties, and read widely on the subject, as shown by the books which she later donated to the Liverpool Medical Institution. The hospital treated the French wounded from the Western Front. The excellence of her leadership as Chief and the work of the unit was recognised by the French Army. Initially 100 beds were opened but by the end of the conflict this had risen to 600. She continued as médecin chef until February, 1919, with only one period of leave in England, which she spent largely in lecturing to raise money for the hospital. In 1917 another hospital at Villers-Cotterêts was opened, closer to the Western Front. There she operated under shell fire during the German advance in March, 1918, until they were forced to evacuate back to Royaumont.

Over the course of the war Ivens and her team treated over 10,861 patients including 8,752 soldiers. The bulk of the major surgery was carried out by Ivens and her second in command Ruth Nicholson. The remarkably low mortality rate of 1.82% was lower than similar military hospitals. The Royaumont doctors pioneered a new approach to the treatment of gas gangrene, using X-rays and bacteriology for diagnosis, followed by extensive surgical debridement of the affected tissue. They were also able to use antiserum supplied by the Pasteur Institute in Paris. Ivens published accounts of the research in medical literature, and later acknowledged how the research, particularly into gas gangrene, was beneficial for her career.

The hospital was inspected and approved by many French generals and government officials, and its reputation was largely due to the leadership of Ivens.

== Post-war career ==
After the war, Ivens returned to hospital practice in Liverpool. She was closely involved with the rebuilding of the Maternity Hospital, and with the formation of the Liverpool Women's Radium League. She was also a leader in the establishment of the Crofton Recovery Hospital for Women.

During this period, Ivens was active in promoting the cause of women in medicine, and was elected president of the Medical Women's Federation from 1924 to 1926. A few years later, she was the first woman to be elected vice president of the Liverpool Medical Institution in 1929 when she became a founder fellow of the Royal College of Obstetricians and Gynaecologists that same year.

At the age of sixty, she married Charles Knowles, now a widower, whom she had known from student days. They moved to London where she continued a consultant practice until she and her husband retired to Truro in Cornwall. She was succeeded in her posts in Liverpool by Ruth Nicholson who had been her assistant at Royaumont.

With the outbreak of the Second World War in 1939 she acted as medical inspector for the Red Cross in Cornwall. She also played a leading role in the activities of the Royaumont and Villers Cotterêts Association and was chairman of the Cornwall committee of the Friends of the Fighting French.

== Later years and death ==
A fluent French speaker she made regular visits to France where she would visit former patients and many of the wounded whom she had treated at Royaumont wrote regularly to her. She kept in touch too with former staff members who would meet annually at the annual dinner of the Royaumont Association.

She died on 6 February 1944, at the age of 74, in Killagorden, St Clement, Cornwall, and is buried in the graveyard at Kenwyn Parish Church.

== Honours and awards ==
In recognition of her service at Royaumont she was decorated by the French President with a Knight of France's Legion of Honour. In December 1918 she received the Croix de Guerre with palm, the citation reading: "...having ensured, day and night, the treatment of French and Allied wounded during repeated bombardment at Villers Cotterets in May 1918. On the approach of the enemy she withdrew her unit at the last moment to the Abbaye de Royaumont where she continued her humane mission with the most absolute devotion”. She was also awarded the Médaille d'honneur des épidémies. In 1926 she was elected vice president of the Liverpool Medical Institution. The University of Liverpool awarded her the honorary degree of Master of Surgery (ChM) in 1926 and in the same year she became a Commander of the Order of the British Empire (CBE).

== See also ==
- Legion of Honour
- List of Legion of Honour recipients by name (I)
- Legion of Honour Museum
