= Jean Aitken Bell =

Nurse from Scottish Women's Hospitals in Serbian retreat

- Born: 1882; Holytown, Lanarkshire
- Died: 1957; Cathcart, Glasgow
- Other names: Jean Aitken Carmichael
- Occupation: nurse
- Employer: Scottish Women's Hospitals for Foreign Service
- Known for: awarded medals for service including Serbian retreat
- Awards: The British War and Victory Medals, the French Red Cross, the Serbian Cross of Mercy, Retreat Medal 1915

Jean Aitken Bell (1882 – 1957) was a Scottish nurse who served with Dr. Elsie Inglis's Scottish Women's Hospitals for Foreign Service in Serbia. She was among those who were given medals by both Britain and Serbia for war services, including enduring the dangerous winter mountain Serbian retreat, taking their injured patients over the mountains in winter to safety; she served July to December 1915.

== Life and war experience ==
Born Jean Aitken Bell in Holytown, Lanarkshire, to father Duncan Bell of Newhouse, she was known as 'Jeannie', and went to Holytown Public School. She trained at Belvidere Hospital, Glasgow and worked in Thornton Hospital as a health visitor, then joined the Scottish Women's Hospitals for Foreign Service (SWH) in July 1915 and travelled to Serbia, where she was employed in the Second Serbian Unit, under Dr. Alice Hutchison, and she was responsible for about 100 beds. During the moving battles, as the gunfire drew ever nearer the hospital over a two-week period, it was decided to evacuate all the patients (even those bed-ridden) and Bell along with other staff and local 'crowds of refugees' waited 'on and on but no train arrived', spent 18 hours at the station, with almost 60 people sleeping on the floor, before a train of 'open cattle trucks' arrived to take them to Mladnavain. This was the last train before the enemy took over their hospital's town, Sazarevas, as the Austro-German and Bulgarian forces arrived in October 1915.

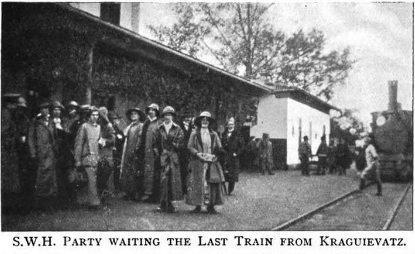
SWH party waiting for the last train

The hospital group in an over-crowded train moved on to Krishevaiz then endured walking from morning till night in a five week trek from 5 November, including a final two weeks in the mountain area between Idpek and Podgoritsa. The Serbian army was sometimes ahead on the road, or behind the group or they were all mixed together along with hundreds of local refugees, riding in bullock carts, through thick clinging mud. To start with Bell and the nurses had to follow the wagons to see the route, and spend nights on the wagons which stretched for miles, later in the mountains, there were only roofless huts, or spaces behind rocks to rest in, surrounded by deep snow.

=== Mountain retreat ===
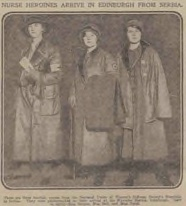
Nurses Gordon Bell and Neish on return from Serbia

Three of the Scottish nurses, Nurse Bell, Nurse Gordon from Moray, and Nurse Neish from Morningside, Edinburgh, were told it was a two hour trip to Velike, where they would meet their colleagues. But they found themselves on a long and dangerous mountain track with severe drops, having to cross mountains of 4,000 ft (over 1,200m), sometimes sleeping in wagons, and another night having got lost had to lie close to keep warm without a roof, with a Serbian woman and her donkey, all with no food nor blankets. Nurse Bell and another colleague fell into a river, which were hard to distinguish from the path. Through torrents of rain and snow, with just crumbs of bread and coffee, and the odd piece of meat in the evening, the group were led out over five weeks by Serbian soldiers, also in rags. Their footprints in the deep snow made a path for the women to follow. Bell said 'we could hardly drag ourselves along' as they suffered hunger, and frostbite to their hands and feet. Their route was passed by Austrian prisoners of war, whom Bell described as 'most emaciated sights' picking up any scraps of food from the mud. The downhill parts were the most challenging, as the nurses described to the press, with ponies having to have tails and heads held tight to stop them losing their footing. One of their colleagues Nurse Toughill died when her transport fell over a cliff.

None of them rested in any form of bed until reaching Montenegro on 9 December. Montenegrins welcomed the nurses, who moved their patients on again after waiting days for boat transport, to Scutari, which they found was 'horribly crowded' and being bombed, and so the group moved on foot to Medna, again with an open-air night of rain to endure.

Bell's experiences were reported in the press and the nurses were praised for their 'patient heroism.'

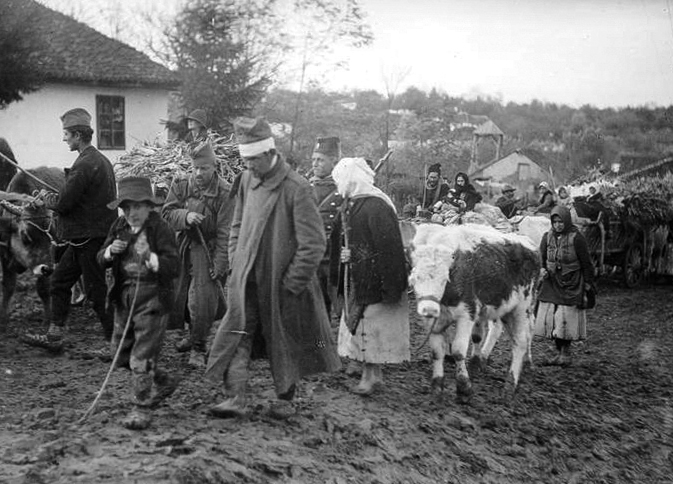
Serbian troops and refugees during the retreat to the Adriatic Sea coast 1915

She became married in Leslie, Fife on 16 March 1916, to John Carmichael, a chemist, who died in 1935. Bell died in 1957 in Cathcart, Glasgow.

== Awards ==
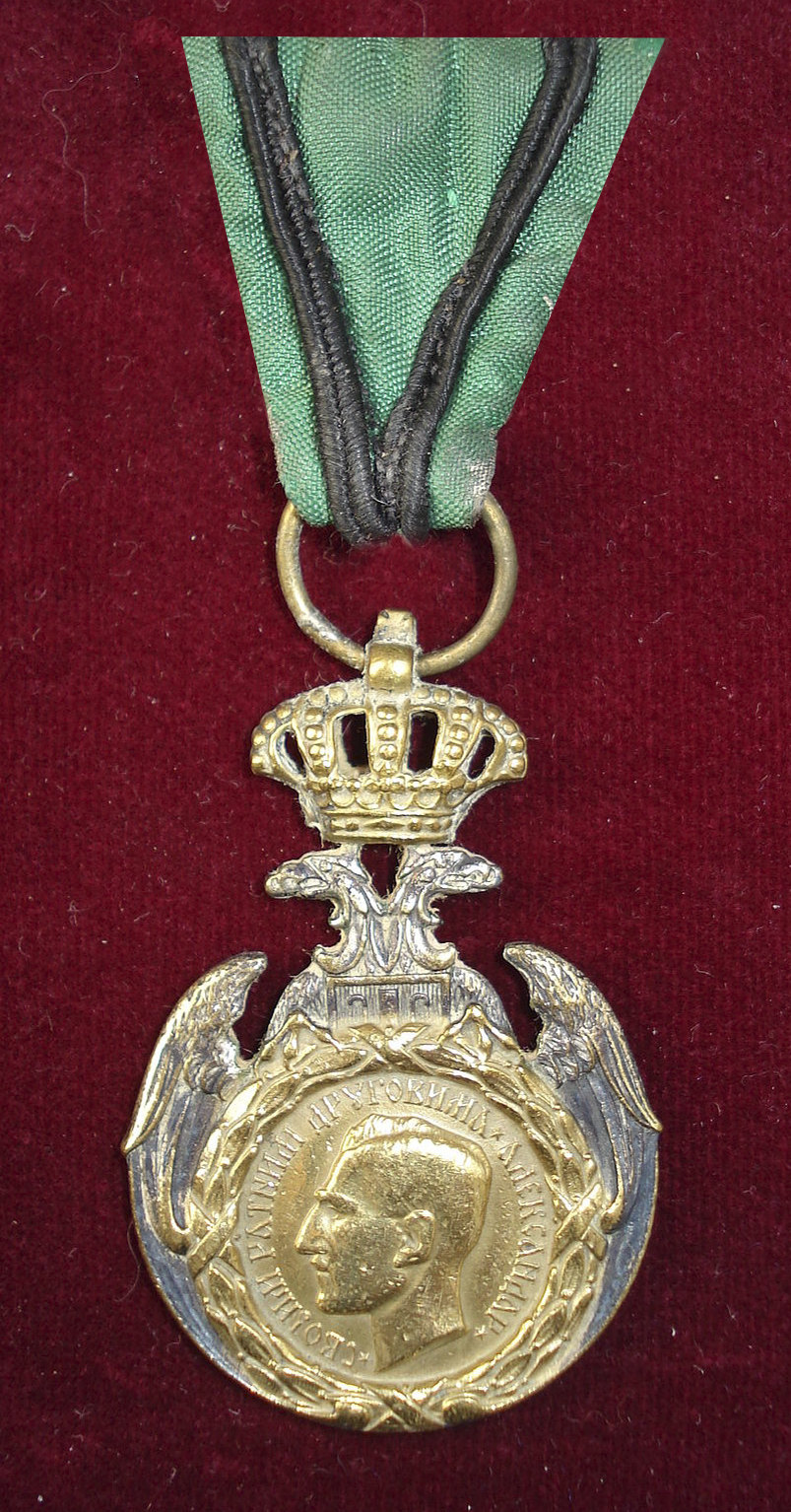
Serbian (Albanian) Retreat Medal 1915

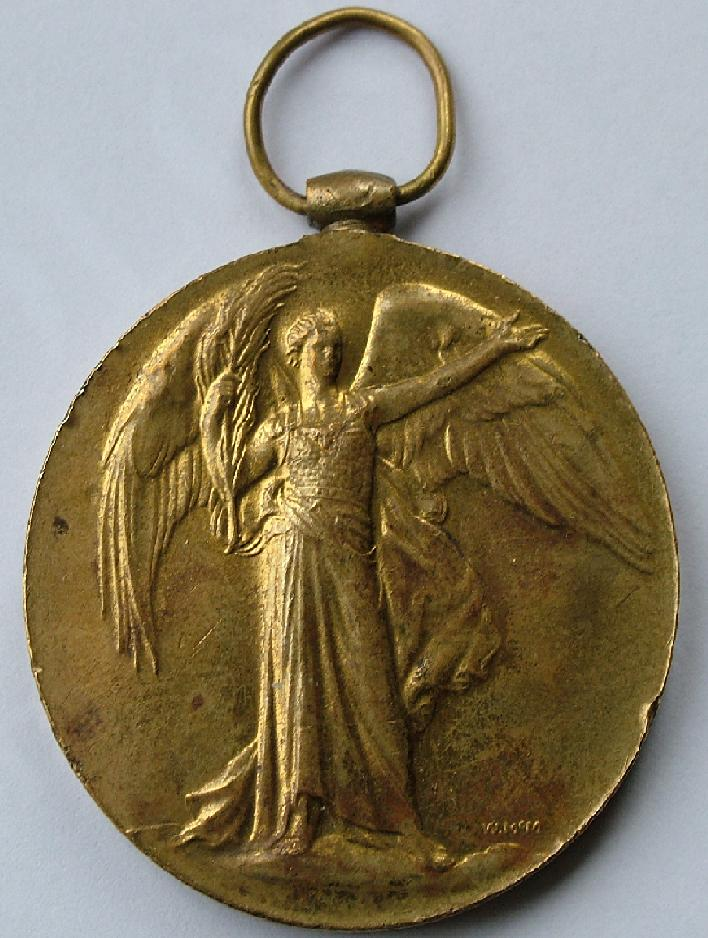
World War I Victory medal (obverse)

Bell was given the British War and Victory Medals, the French Red Cross, the Serbian Cross of Mercy, gilt and enamel; Retreat Medal 1915.

Her medals were auctioned by auctioneer Dix Noonan in November 2019 (see images).

== See also ==
- Scottish Women's Hospitals for Foreign Service
- Great Retreat (Serbian)
