= Laura Hope =

Laura Hope may refer to:

- Laura Lee Hope, a pseudonym used for several series of children's novels
- Laura Margaret Hope, Australia's first woman surgeon
