= Florence Missouri Caton =

British nurse (1875–1917)

- Born: 13 July 1875; At sea
- Died: 15 July 1917 (aged 42); Serbia
- Burial place: Lembet Road Military Cemetery, Salonika
- Employer: Scottish Women's Hospitals for Foreign Service

Florence Missouri Caton (13 July 1875 – 15 July 1917) was a British nurse who served in Serbia during World War I. She died during the war.

== Biography ==
Caton was born on 13 July 1875, to parents John Henry Caton, a Ship's Officer, and Elizabeth Caton née Evans. She was born aboard her father's ship Missouri, off the coast of Cuba. She was raised Wrexham, Wales.

After training as a nurse at Wrexham Infirmary, Caton was employed for over a decade at the Sanitorium of the Hospital for Infectious Diseases in Pendleton, Lancashire. After the outbreak of World War I, the Scottish Women's Hospitals for Foreign Service (SWH) was founded by Dr Elsie Inglis to support the war effort and as women medics were not permitted to serve on the frontlines. The organisation was funded by private donations, fundraising of local societies, the National Union of Women's Suffrage Societies (NUWSS) and the American Red Cross.

Caton joined the SWH in September 1915 and was appointed a sister of the American section, attached to the Royal Serbian Army. She travelled on the hospital ship The Oxfordshire, arrived in Valjevo in October 1915 and worked under the command of Alice Hutchinson. Not long after Caton arrived at Valjevo, Belgrade fell and Caton's medical unit was evacuated to Vrinjatcha Bania. Caton nursed at the 100 bed hospital there, but was imprisoned when it was overrun by invading Austrian troops in November 1915. Effectively prisoners of war, Caton and her colleagues were moved to Krushevac, then on to Hungary, where they were not allowed to work despite outbreaks of cholera and cases of frostbite amongst the Serbian soldiers who were also imprisoned. After five weeks they were released and sent home, travelling through Budapest, Vienna and Bern by train. Caton arrived home in February 1916.

Caton set out again from Britain to the Balkans, travelling to the 4th Serbian Hospital in Salonika. She served here, in Lake Ostrovo, in Mikra Bay and in various field dressing hospitals treating Serbian soldiers with battle injuries, cases of malaria and the symptoms of gas gangrene.

In July 1917, Caton declined medical attention fearing that she might be returned home to Britain. She died from appendicitis and was buried at the Lembet Road Military Cemetery, Salonika.

She is commemorated on the SWH Roll of Honour, on the Wartime Nurses Memorial at the National Memorial Arboretum in Staffordshire, and in the book The Cross of Sacrifice: Officers Who Died in the Service of British, Indian and East African Regiments and Corps, 1914-1919.
