= Marthe Cnockaert =

Belgian nurse and British spy in First World War

Marthe Cnockaert McKenna
- Born: Marthe Mathilde Cnockaert; 28 October 1892; Westrozebeke, West Flanders, Belgium
- Died: 8 January 1966 (aged 73); Westrozebeke, West Flanders, Belgium
- Occupations: Nurse, Spy
- Spouse: John McKenna
- Parent(s): Felix Cnockaert; Marie-Louise Vanoplinus
- Awards: Iron Cross; Mentioned in Despatches; Legion of Honour
- Espionage activity
- Allegiance: United Kingdom
- Service branch: Military agent
- Service years: 2
- Codename: Laura

Marthe Mathilde Cnockaert (28 October 1892 – 8 January 1966), later Marthe McKenna, was a Belgian nurse who became a spy for the United Kingdom and its allies during the First World War. She later became a novelist, and is credited with writing over a dozen spy novels in addition to her memoirs and short stories.

== Early life ==
Marthe Mathilde Cnockaert was born on 28 October 1892 in the village of Westrozebeke in the Belgian province of West Flanders, to Felix Cnockaert and his wife Marie-Louise Vanoplinus. She began studying at the medical school at Ghent University, but her studies were interrupted by the outbreak of World War I.

== World War I ==
In August 1914, German troops razed the village, burning her home down and temporarily separating her family. Cnockaert was studying medicine but was conscripted as a nurse at a German military hospital located in the village, where she was valued for her medical training and her multi-lingual skills, speaking English and German as well as French and Flemish. She was happily awarded the Iron Cross by the Germans for her medical service.

In 1915, she was transferred to the German Military Hospital in Roulers, where she was reunited with her family who had also moved there after the destruction of their home. Around this time, she was approached by a family friend and former neighbour, Lucelle Deldonck, who revealed to Cnockaert that she was a British intelligence agent, and wished to recruit her to an Anglo-Belgian intelligence network operating in the town.

For two years, Cnockaert (codenamed "Laura") used her cover as a nurse and her frequent proximity to German military personnel—at both the hospital and as a waitress at her parents' café—to gather important military intelligence for the British and their allies, which she passed on to other agents in local churches. She mostly worked with two other female Belgian spies: an elderly vegetable seller codenamed "Canteen Ma", and a letterbox agent codenamed "Number 63", both of whom helped her relay messages to and from British General Headquarters. Her exploits during the war included destroying a telephone line which a local priest was using to spy for the Germans; and obtaining details of a planned but cancelled visit by Kaiser Wilhelm II for a British aerial attack. At one stage, her German lodger, Otto, tried to recruit her to spy on the British. Cnockaert attempted to relay harmless but seemingly important information to him for a short time, but when operating as a double agent became too difficult, she arranged for him to be killed.

She discovered a disused sewer tunnel system located underneath a German ammunition depot, and placed the explosives to destroy the ammo dump; however, this operation led to her exposure and capture when she lost her watch, engraved with her initials, while placing the dynamite. In November 1916, Cnockaert was sentenced to death for her espionage; however, her sentence was commuted to life imprisonment due to her Iron Cross honour. She served two years in grim conditions in a prison in Ghent, and was released in 1918 when the Armistice with Germany was declared, ending the war.

== After the war ==
Cnockaert was awarded British, French and Belgian honours for gallantry for her espionage work—she was mentioned in despatches on 8 November 1918 by Field Marshal Sir Douglas Haig in recognition of her intelligence work, as well as receiving a British certificate for gallantry from Winston Churchill; she was also made a member of the French and Belgian Legions of Honour.

She married John "Jock" McKenna, a British army officer. Her memoir I Was a Spy! was ghostwritten by her husband and published under her married name in 1932. Winston Churchill wrote the foreword for the book. The publication of her memoir was prompted by the visit of an English author who encouraged Marthe to write and publish details of her wartime experiences. Following a warm critical and popular reception of her memoirs and other espionage anecdotes, the McKennas published a string of over a dozen spy novels. Although published under Marthe's name, it is speculated that her husband was largely responsible for their writing.

The couple moved to Manchester during World War II and, despite her retirement, she was listed in 'The Black Book' of prominent subjects to be arrested by the Nazis in the case of a successful invasion of Britain.

The McKennas later returned to Marthe's family home in Westrozebeke, and no further books were forthcoming after the McKennas' marriage ended around 1951. McKenna remained in Westrozebeke, and died in 1966.

== Portrayal in media ==
Cnockaert was portrayed by Madeleine Carroll in Victor Saville's 1933 film I Was a Spy, based on her memoirs.

== Further Information ==
The website First World War Women has a biography of Cnockaert in its "Gallantry" section. Also featured in the same section are fellow nurses Kate Luard, Yvonne Fitzroy and Beatrice Hopkinson

== Works ==
- 1932: I Was a Spy! ISBN 978-1910860038
- 1934: Spies I Knew ISBN 978-1910860151
- 1935: A Spy Was Born ISBN 978-1494060619
- 1936: My Master Spy: a narrative of secret service
- 1936: Drums Never Beat
- 1937: Lancer Spy: a story of war-time secret service and espionage
- 1937: Set a Spy
- 1938: Double Spy: a story of modern secret service
- 1939: Hunt a Spy
- 1939: Spying Blind
- 1941: Spy in Khaki
- 1942: Arms and Spy
- 1943: Nightfighter Spy
- 1944: Watch Across the Channel
- 1946: Write Your Own Best-Seller
- 1950: Three Spies for Glory
- 1951: What's Past is Prologue
