= Katherine Harley (suffragist) =

British suffragist

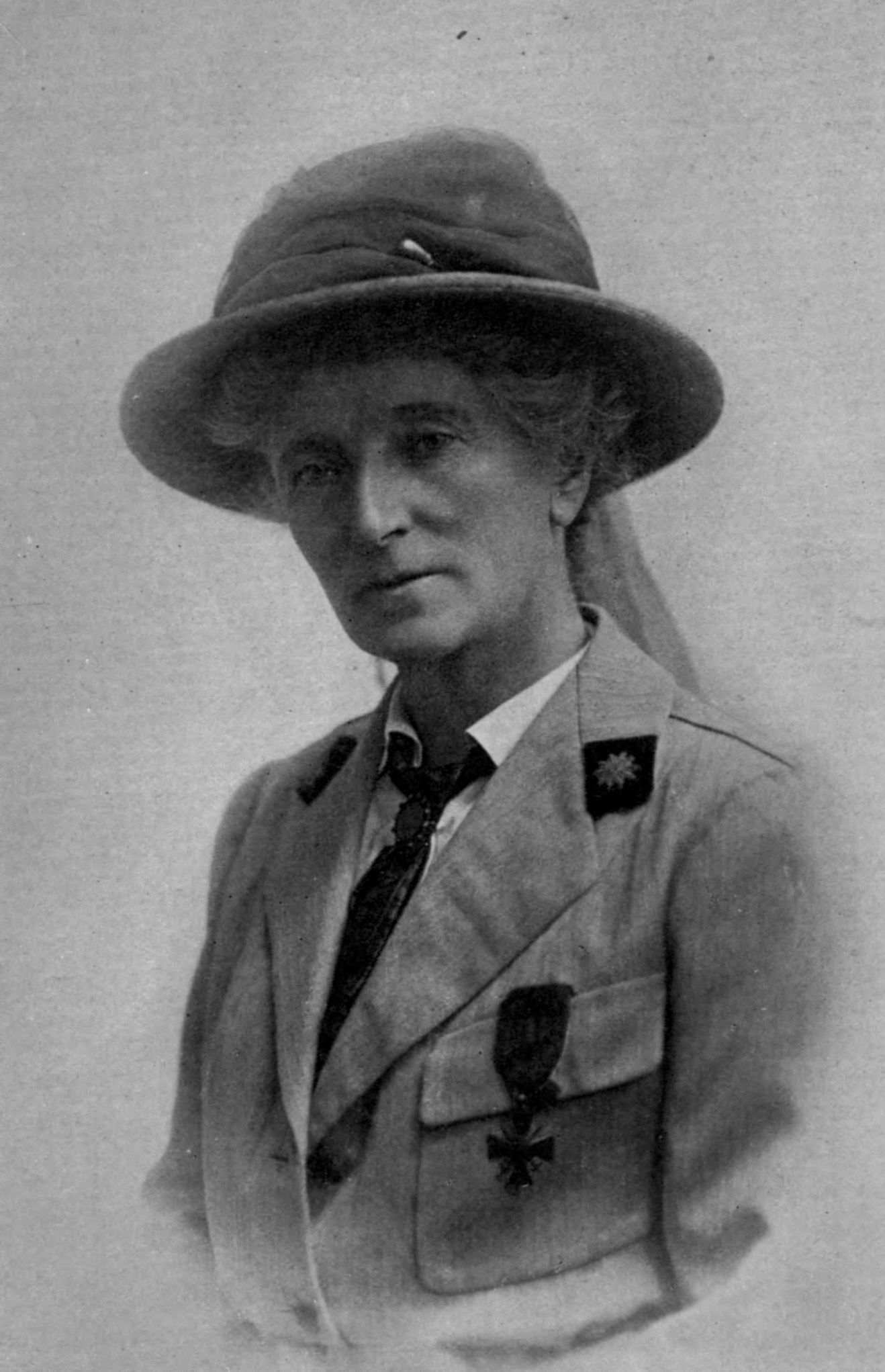
- Harley in c. 1917
- Born: 3 May 1855
- Died: 7 March 1917 (aged 61); Monastir, Serbia (now in the Republic of North Macedonia)
- Relatives: John French, 1st Earl of Ypres (brother); Charlotte Despard (sister)

Katherine Mary Harley (3 May 1855 – 7 March 1917) was a suffragist. In 1913 she proposed and organised the Great Pilgrimage on behalf of the National Union of Women's Suffrage Societies. During the First World War she helped to found and organise the Women's Emergency Corps.

== Early and mid-life: 1855–1914 ==
Katherine Harley was born in Kent, England, on 3 May 1855, the youngest of six daughters of Margaret French, née Eccles, and her husband John Tracy William French, a Royal Navy commander from Ireland. Katherine's siblings included an elder sister, Charlotte (later Charlotte Despard, born in 1844) and brother John (later 1st Earl of Ypres, born in 1852). Katherine's father died before she was born, and her mother was confined to an asylum by 1867; she was raised by relatives.

She married on 8 January 1877 Colonel George Ernest Harley, CB, of Condover House, Shropshire, an officer in The Buffs, with whom she had one son and two daughters. Her husband died on 22 July 1907 aged 62.

In 1910 Harley joined the National Union of Women's Suffrage Societies (NUWSS), and became the honorary treasurer of the Midland Region. She was made president of the Shropshire branch of the NUWSS in 1913. She was also a member of the Church League for Women's Suffrage. In 1913 she proposed, and organised, the Great Pilgrimage. The pilgrimage was a march along six routes to converge on Hyde Park, London, where there would be a rally. The march took place between 18 June and 26 July 1913.

== First World War ==
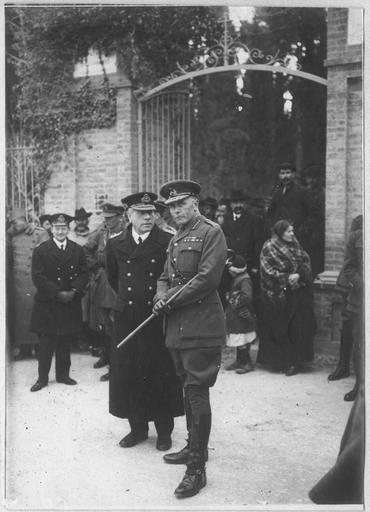
Chief mourners at her funeral

In 1914 Harley volunteered to assist the war effort by serving as a nurse with the Scottish Women's Hospitals for Foreign Service (SWH) in France, where she was awarded the Croix de Guerre. She became director of the hospital that Elsie Inglis's SWH organisation had located in the Abbaye de Royaumont, 40 kilometres north of Paris, from January to April 1915 and then directed the hospital installed under tents in the Domaine de Chanteloup, Sainte-Savine, near Troyes, from June to October 1915.

In late 1915 she transferred to Greece to nurse on the Balkan Front. In June 1916 she established a motorised ambulance unit attached to the Royal Serbian Army in Macedonia that operated near the front line, often at night, despite district orders to the contrary. In December 1916 she left the Scottish Women's Hospitals service to join an independent ambulance unit serving the civilian population of Monastir, Serbia (now in the Republic of North Macedonia). She rented a house in Monastir after its capture, and it was there, on 7 March 1917, that she was killed by shellfire. She was buried on 10 March in the city of Salonika, her funeral attended by General Milne—the commander of the British forces in the Balkans—and George, Crown Prince of Serbia.

== Memorials ==
Her gravestone, a large white stone cross in Salonika (Lembet Road) Military Cemetery, reads "On your tomb instead of flowers the gratitude of the Serbs shall blossom there".

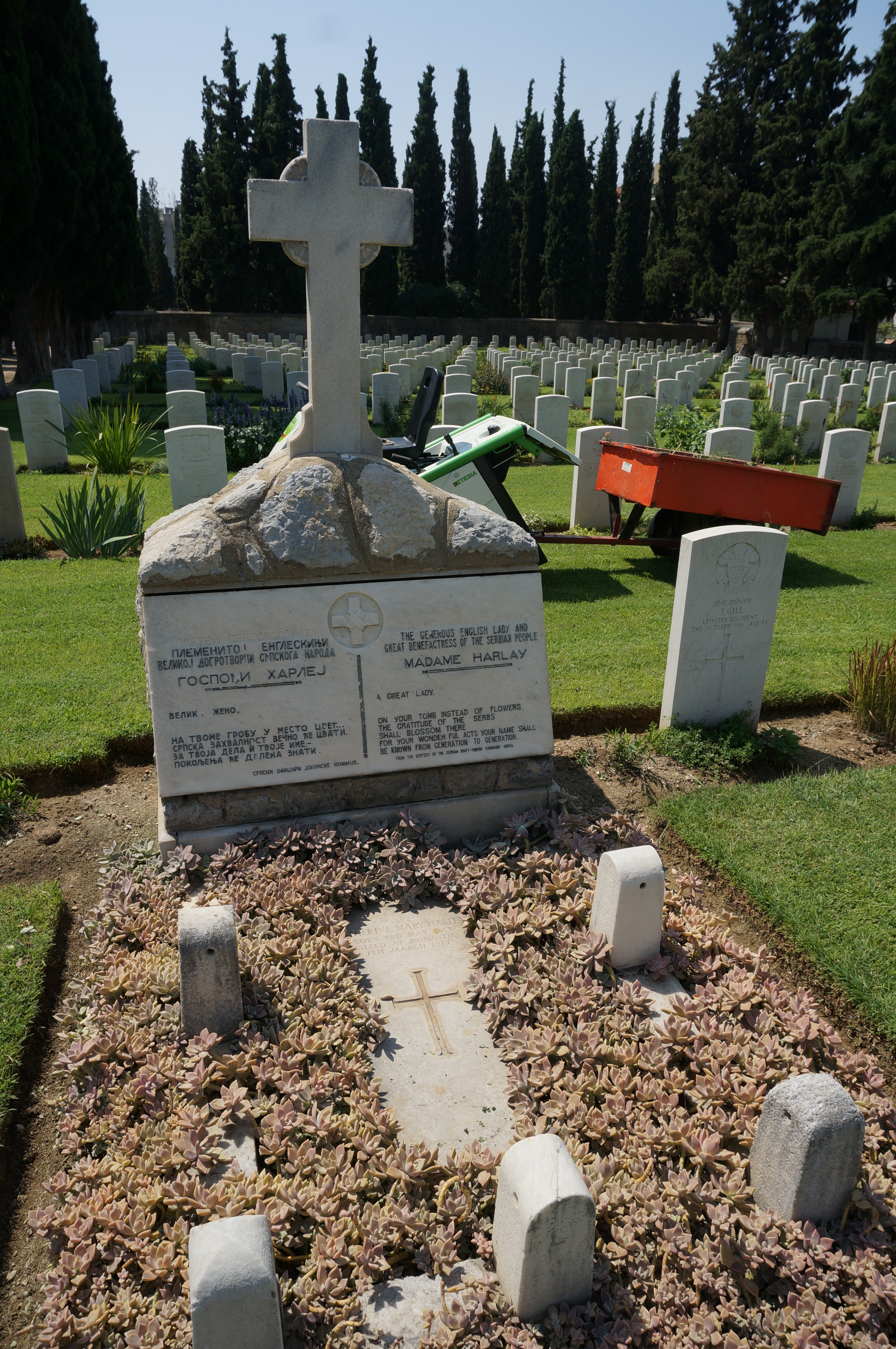
At Zeitenlik

She is commemorated twice in Condover parish church in Shropshire, on a plaque on an oak screen that was erected in memory of her husband and herself, and on the parish's First World War memorial tablet which incorrectly names her "Katherine Ellen Harley". She also appears on the parish war memorial in the Trinity Chapel of St Mary's Church, Shrewsbury.

A memorial fund was raised by the Women's Citizens Association by 1924, which partly endowed a cot in the Royal Salop Infirmary in Shrewsbury and partly was invested in Conversion Stock to fund the annual award of the Sister Harley Memorial medals in gold and silver to two student nurses who scored the highest marks in exams; this was awarded during the lifetime of the hospital which closed in 1977.

== See also ==
- Elsie Inglis Memorial Maternity Hospital
- Scottish Women's Hospitals for Foreign Service
- Eveline Haverfield – British suffragette and aid worker (1867–1920)
- Elizabeth Ness MacBean Ross – Scottish physician (1878 - 1915)
- Leila Paget – British humanitarian
- Mabel St Clair Stobart – British suffragist and aid-worker
- Josephine Bedford – Australian philanthropist and WWI ambulance driver (1861-1955)
- Elsie Inglis – Scottish doctor (1864–1917)
- Isabel Emslie Hutton – Scottish physician (1887–1960)
- Katherine Stewart MacPhail – Scottish physician (1887–1974)

== References and sources ==
=== Sources ===
- Atkinson, Diane (2018). Rise Up Women!: The Remarkable Lives of the Suffragettes (Kindle ed.). London: Bloomsbury. ISBN 978-1-4088-4406-9.
- Beckett, Ian F. W. (2004). "French, John Denton Pinkstone, first earl of Ypres (1852–1925)". Oxford Dictionary of National Biography (online ed.). Oxford University Press. doi:10.1093/ref:odnb/33272. (Subscription, Wikipedia Library access or UK public library membership required.)
- Crawford, Elizabeth (2003). The Women's Suffrage Movement: A Reference Guide 1866–1928. London: UCL Press. ISBN 978-1-135-43402-1.
- "Katherine Harley". Spartacus Educational.
- "Katherine Harley". Commonwealth War Graves Commission. Archived from the original on 1 July 2019.
- Keeling-Roberts, Margaret (1981). In Retrospect, A Short History of the Royal Salop Infirmary. Wem, Shropshire: North Shropshire Printing Company.
- Mate, C. H., ed. (1907). Shropshire, Historical, Descriptive, Biographical - Volume II, Biographical. C.H. Mate, Bournemouth, Dorset. p. 136.
- Mulvihill, Margaret (2004). "Despard [née French], Charlotte (1844–1939)". Oxford Dictionary of National Biography (online ed.). Oxford University Press. doi:10.1093/ref:odnb/37356. (Subscription, Wikipedia Library access or UK public library membership required.)
- Nicolle, Dorothy (2015). Shrewsbury in the Great War. Barnsley, South Yorkshire: Pen and Sword. ISBN 978-1-78383-113-5.
- Robinson, Jane (2018). Hearts and Minds: The Untold Story of the Great Pilgrimage and How Women Won the Vote. London: Transworld. ISBN 978-1-4735-4086-6.
