= Elsie Inglis Memorial Maternity Hospital =

- NHS Lothian
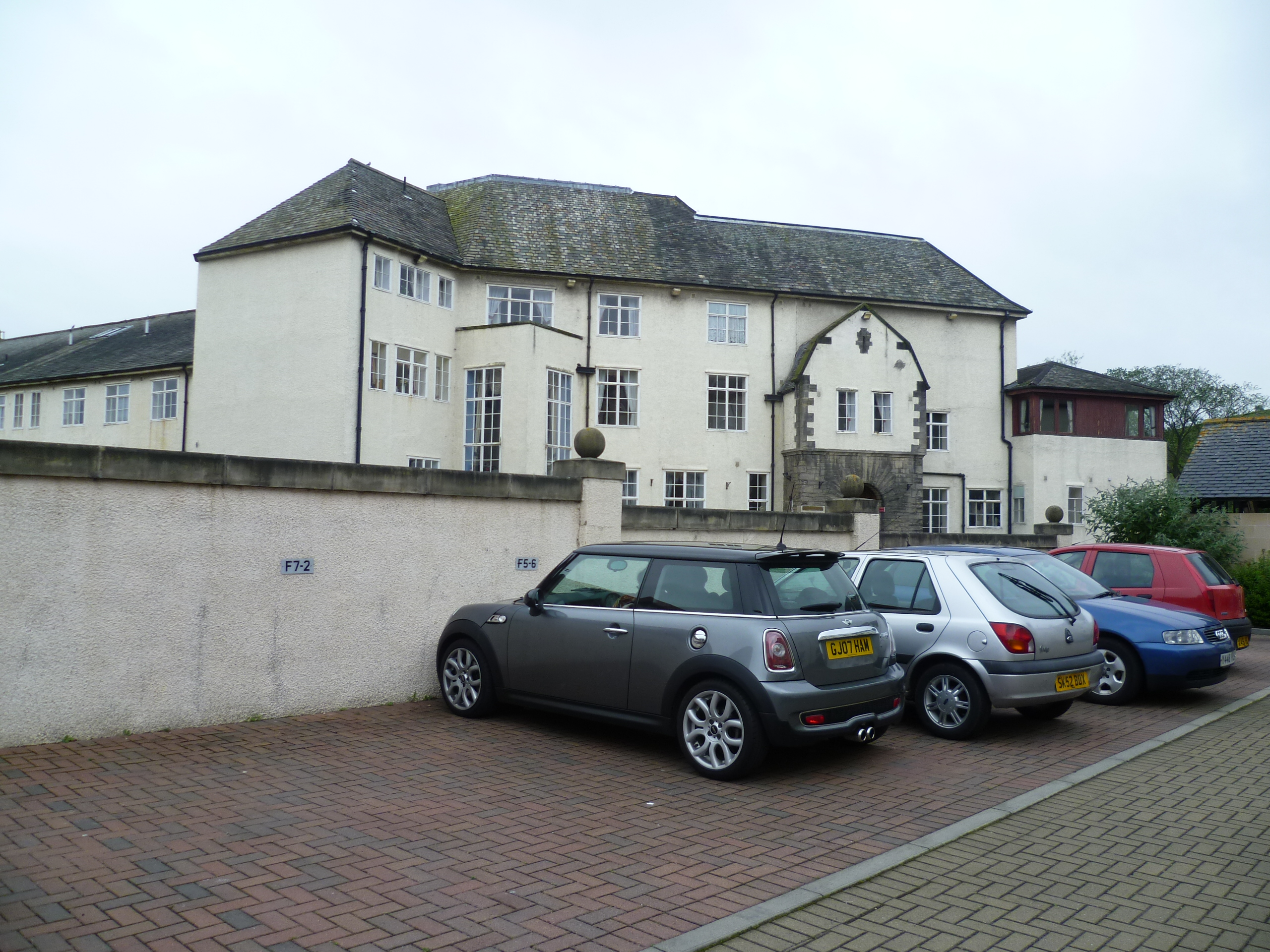
- Former Elsie Inglis Memorial Maternity Hospital

- Shown in Edinburgh

Geography
- Location: Edinburgh, Scotland
- Coordinates: 55°57′17″N 3°9′56″W

Organisation
- Care system: NHS Scotland

Services
- Emergency department: No

History
- Founded: 1925
- Closed: 1988

Links
- Lists: Hospitals in Scotland

The Elsie Inglis Memorial Maternity Hospital was a maternity hospital in Abbeyhill, Edinburgh, Scotland.

== History ==
The hospital was established with surplus funds arising from disbandment of the Scottish Women's Hospitals for Foreign Service, an organisation which had been formed by Elsie Inglis and which had sent hospital units to France, Serbia, Russia, Corsica and Greece during the First World War. The 20-bed hospital opened in July 1925. The hospital joined the National Health Service in 1948 and was directly managed by the Royal Infirmary of Edinburgh. After services transferred to the Eastern General Hospital, despite public protests about the proposed closure, the facility closed in 1988. Following assurances that another maternity unit in the city would be named after Inglis, one journalist suggested renaming the Royal Hospital for Children and Young People after her.

The original maternity facility subsequently re-opened as a private nursing home and nursery, but following an investigation into the death of a 59-year-old woman, it closed again in 2011. The building was converted and the site is now occupied by residential properties.

== Memorial ==
The memorial role of the hospital will be continued with the creation of a statue of Elsie Inglis in Edinburgh.
