= Kate Luard =

British nurse (1872–1962)

Kate Evelyn Luard
- Born: 29 June 1872; Aveley, Essex
- Died: 16 August 1962 (aged 90); Wickham Bishops, Essex
- Burial place: St Bartholomew's Church, Wickham Bishops
- Military career
- Allegiance: United Kingdom
- Branch: Queen Alexandra's Imperial Military Nursing Service (Reserve)
- Service years: 1900–1918
- Rank: Nursing Sister
- Nickname: Evie
- Conflicts: Second Boer War; First World War
- Awards: Royal Red Cross & Bar; Mentioned in Despatches (2)
- Other work: Author

Kate Evelyn Luard, RRC & Bar (29 June 1872 – 16 August 1962), was a British nurse in the Second Boer War and First World War who was awarded the Royal Red Cross and Bar. She was the author of two books describing her experiences.

== Early life ==
Luard was born in Aveley vicarage in Essex on 29 June 1872. Her father was Bixby Garnham Luard, the vicar of Aveley between 1871 and 1895. Her mother was Clara Isabella Sandford Bramston. She had twelve brothers and sisters, three of whom were born after her. She subsequently moved to Birch, Essex, after her father was appointed to that living.

She was educated at Croydon High School, where the headmistress, Dorinda Neligan, had served as a nurse at the Siege of Metz during the Franco Prussian War in 1870–71. Luard worked as a teacher and governess in order to pay for nursing training. She completed three months as a paying probationer from January to April 1896 at The London Hospital under Eva Luckes, and then worked at East London Hospital for Children and Dispensary for Women before training at King's College Hospital, London, between 1897 and 1900.

== War service ==
Luard served as a nurse in the Second Boer War and was one of the first nurses to join the British Expeditionary Force at the start of the First World War. She arrived in France on 8 August 1914 and was therefore listed as eligible for the 1914 Star, with a clasp because she served under enemy fire, although it is not clear whether she received it. Initially, she worked on ambulance trains bringing the wounded from the battlefields. During the war she was twice mentioned in despatches and was awarded the Royal Red Cross and Bar. The first award of the Royal Red Cross was gazetted in January 1916, and the bar in May 1918. Luard was Head Sister of No. 32 Casualty Clearing Station at Brandhoek during the Battle of Passchendaele.

She resigned from the Queen Alexandra's Imperial Military Nursing Service (Reserve) shortly after the Armistice because of the illness of her father.

== Post war ==
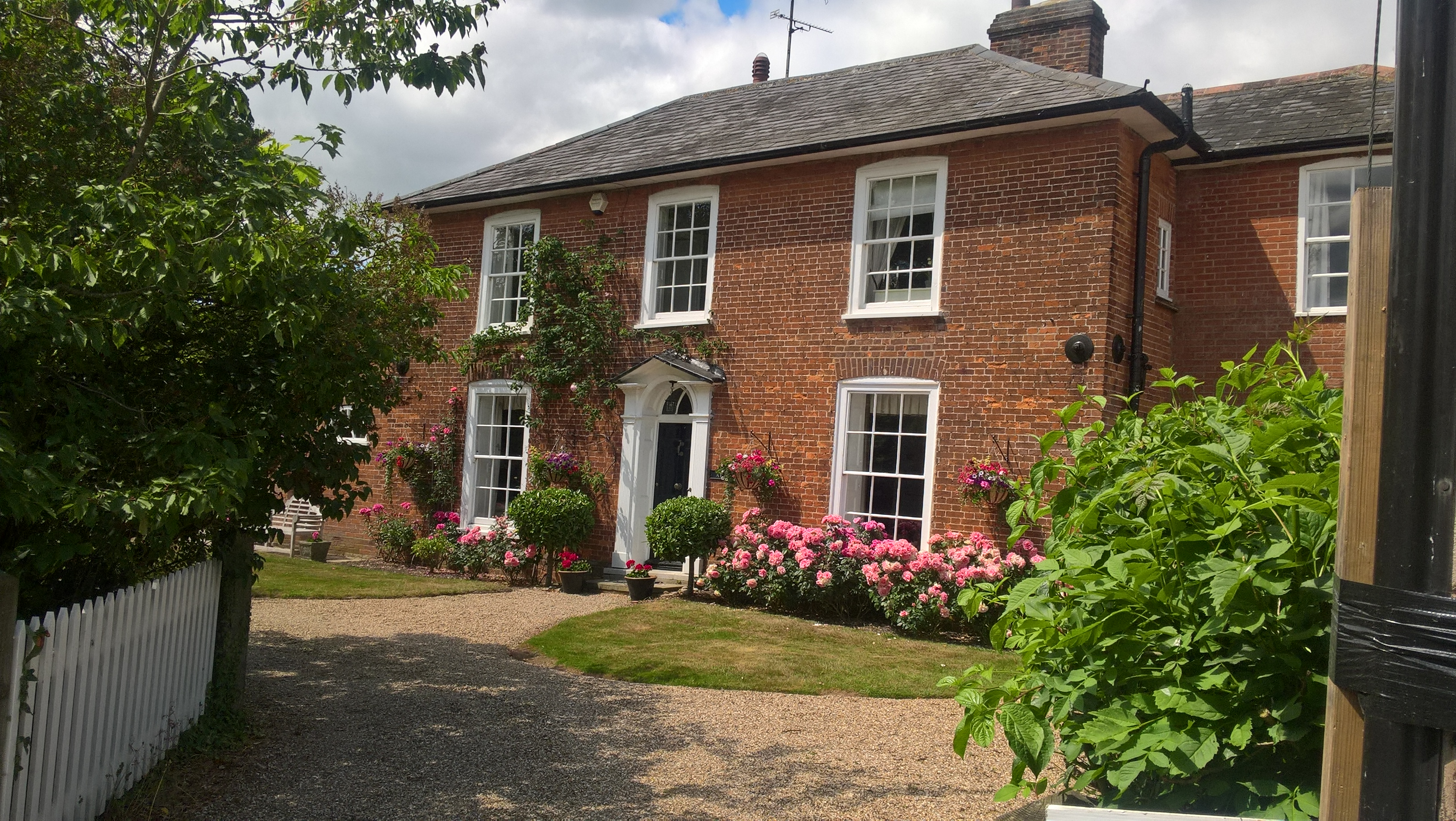
Abbotts, the home of Kate Luard in Wickham Bishops

After the war, Luard worked in the South London Hospital for Women, and as matron at Bradfield College in Berkshire from 1924 to 1932. She retired to Wickham Bishops in Essex, where she died on 16 August 1962.

== Further information ==
Along with fellow nurses Marthe Cnockaert, Beatrice Hodgkinson and Yvonne Fitzroy, Luard's name is included in the "Gallantry" section of the First World War Women website.

== Publications ==
Luard is the author of two accounts of her experiences in the war:

- Diary of a Nursing Sister on the Western Front, William Blackwood & Sons, 1915 (published anonymously);
- Unknown Warriors, the Letters of Kate Luard, History Press Limited, 2017.
