= Georgina Davidson =

Scottish doctor in World War I

Georgina Davidson MBChB
- Born: 3 October 1886
- Died: Unknown
- Education: University of Edinburgh
- Occupation: doctor in world war i
- Employer(s): Scottish Women's Hospitals for Foreign Service and Royal Army Medical Corps
- Awards: French Red Cross and mentioned in despatches won the Victory Medal and British War Medal

Georgina Davidson MBChB (3 October 1886 – alive in 1919) was a Scottish medical doctor who served with the Scottish Women's Hospitals for Foreign Service in Serbia in World War I, and worked along with the Royal Army Medical Corps in war zone hospital services in Malta, Salonika and Constantinople. She was awarded the French Red Cross medal and the British War and Victory medals, and was mentioned in dispatches.

== Family and education ==
Georgina Elizabeth Davidson, was born in Edinburgh, the daughter of a clergyman. She sat her medical examinations at the University of Edinburgh in 1913, while living at 7 Bellevue Crescent in the city, and completed her training (MBChB) in 1914.

== War service ==
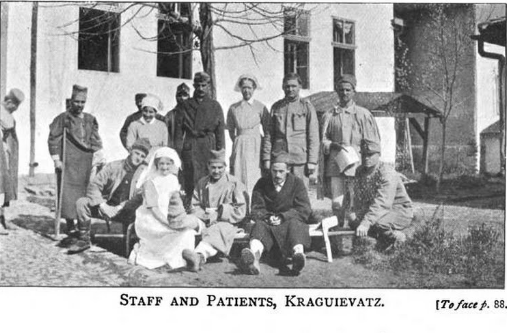
Scottish Women's Hospital Kragujevac Serbia – Staff and patients

=== Serbia ===
In April 1915, Georgina Davidson was working as a Medical Officer in Serbia, with Dr. Elsie Inglis's Scottish Women's Hospitals for Foreign Service and from July 1915 to February 1916, she was also working with the French Red Cross.

Davidson was at the unit in Kraguievac and was under direct enemy fire in August 1915, having chosen to be one of those doctors and nurses who stayed behind with their patients considered too weak to make the journey or the gruelling Serbian Retreat. On returning home, she told the press that the air and heavy artillery attack lasted for 'a few hours' with 'windows broken' and 'terrific' explosions. The hospital was not directly hit, but her team had to transfer patients to safety on the ground, and fortunately only three nurses were injured, struck by debris and glass at the staff rest house while Davidson and others could only watch. She underplayed her own risk and her contribution, simply saying 'we were working under the greatest difficulty, for darkness came on quickly, and the gas went out,' as she ended up wearing a Serbian soldier's hat as her own was lost, but the reporter noted that she had 'managed to preserve her monocle through her vicissitudes'.

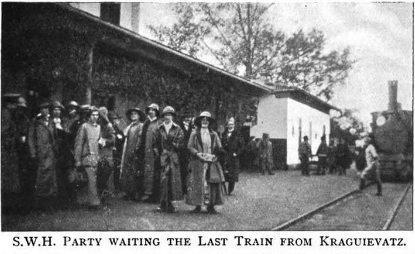
Scottish Women's Hospital people waiting for the last train from Kragujevac

The hospital was taken over by the opposing forces in December and the women were allowed to make their journey home, still under risk with the railway under air attacks.

=== Malta and Salonika ===
Then in July 1916, she took a role with the Royal Army Medical Corps. (RAMC) for a year as a paid civilian surgeon. On 12 August 1916, their Women's Medical Unit set off for Malta on the hospital ship, Gloucester, with Davidson as one of the 16 'lady doctors' with the group. She and the other women were doing the same war zone medical work as male doctors, but were classed as civilians and although they may have had equal pay or conditions of service, they were not ranked or treated as commissioned officers, both points which were debated in the House of Commons, including an elected member asking the Financial Secretary to the War Office: 'Is it sex or incompetence that prevents them getting commissions?'.

Malta had become a centre for treatment for injured from various battle zones including Gallipoli and Salonika. But the hospital ships were coming frequently under attack en route to safety, and so the medical units (including Davidson's) were then despatched to be located nearer to the front, on 1 June 1917, and she served in Salonika until 16 October 1919.

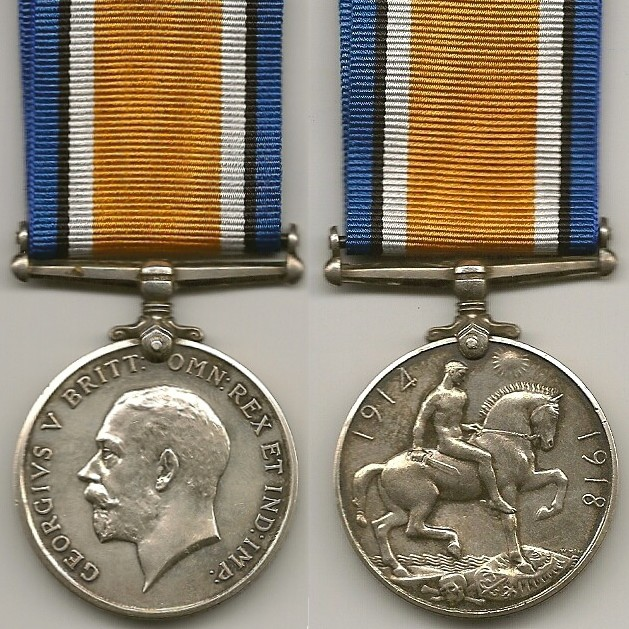
WW1 British War Medal

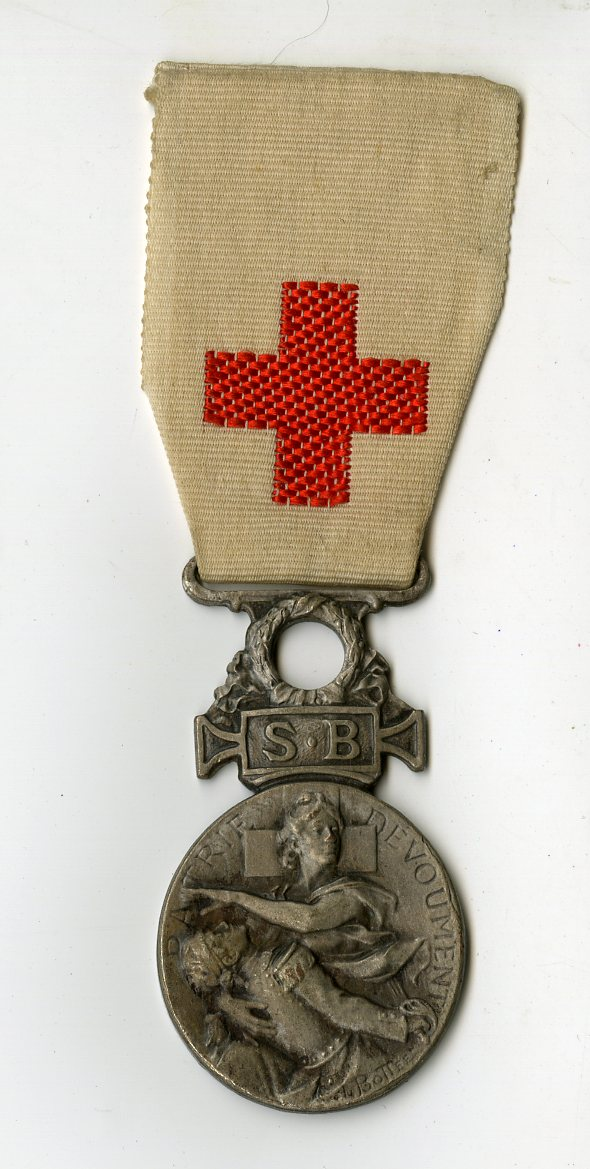
French Red Cross medal

Victory Medal Ribbon Oak Leaves = mention in dispatches

On 5 June 1919, Davidson was mentioned in dispatches. She won the French Red Cross medal, the British War Medal and Victory Medal.

=== Final deployment and return ===
When the war against the Ottoman Empire was settled in a peace treaty (Treaty of Mudros), Davidson was employed on sanitary duties with the British troops in Constantinople, but although the army occupation continued until 1923, her own contract expired and she returned home in autumn 1919.

== See also ==
- Scottish Women's Hospitals for Foreign Service
