= Mary Annie de Burgh Burt =

Sister in the Scottish Women's Hospital, World War One

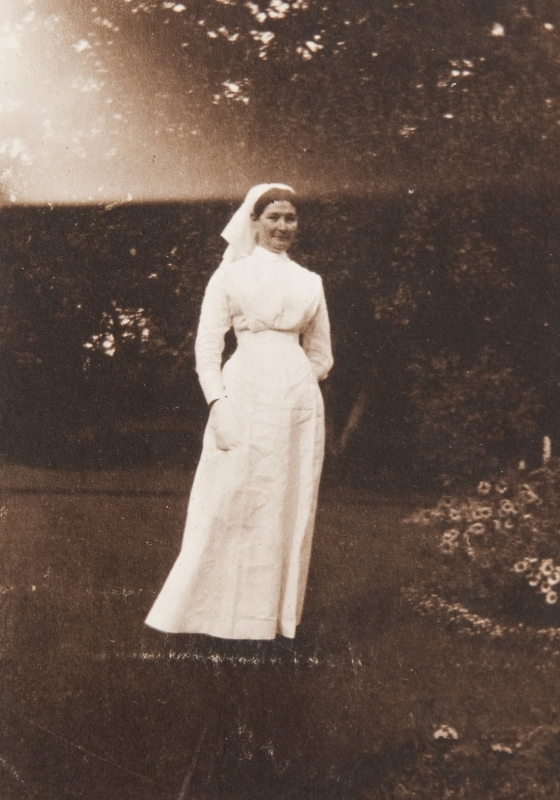
- Born: 1874
- Died: 7 April 1916 (aged 41–42); Salonica, Greece
- Cause of death: Dysentery
- Resting place: Lambet Road Military Cemetery, Salonica, Greece
- Occupation: Nurse
- Organization: Scottish Women's Hospitals
- Awards: French Red Cross Medal

Mary Annie De Burgh Burt (1874 - 1916) was a sister in the Scottish Women's Hospital (SWH), Girton & Newnham Unit, based in Troyes, France and Macedonia in World War One.

Burt was one of the Queen Victoria’s Jubilee Institute for nurses as a Health Visitor to Finsbury Social Workers’ Association. When she joined the Scottish Women's Hospital as a Sister, Burt was living in London at 49 Norfolk Square, Hyde Park. She had been a member of the National Union of Women's Suffrage Societies (NUWSS) who brought together suffrage societies in the UK. On 28 October 1915, a unit of women sponsored by the NUWSS from London left for Salonika left from Liverpool.

Burt's unit had travelled with the French Expeditionary Force from France to Serbia and onto Salonika. The women were exposed not only to the severe challenges for warfront medicine, but to challenges of extremes of weather in winter or summer in a tented hospital, and along with their patients exposed to the risks of malaria and dysentery.

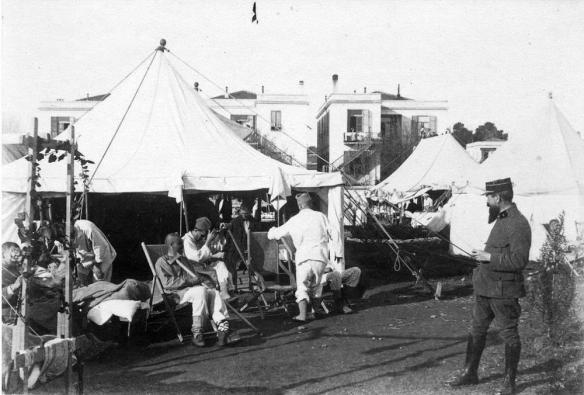
Scottish Women's Hospital, in Salonica

Mary Burt died on 7 April 1916, at the age of 42, and was listed on 24 February 1917 among those of the staff at the SWH, who had died of dysentery. Fellow staff mourned the death of their colleagues but had to continue nursing, of course. She is buried at Lambet Road Military Cemetery, Salonica, Greece.

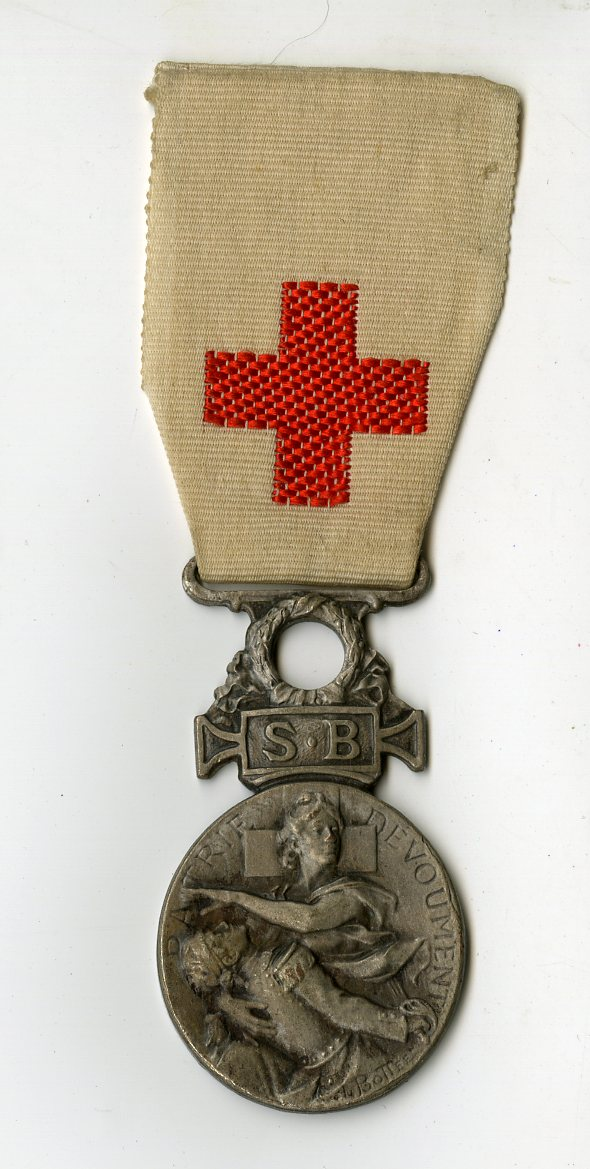
French Red Cross Medal

Burt was awarded the French Red Cross Medal, and was named among over 1500 women who died in the Great War on the roll of honour in York Minster's St Nicholas Chapel Five Sisters Window.
