= Ishobel Ross =

Scottish nurse (1890–1965)

Ishobel Ross (18 February, 1890 – 1965) was a Scottish nurse and diarist. During World War I she joined the Scottish Women's Hospitals for Foreign Service after hearing a lecture by Elsie Inglis. Ross spent a year on the Balkan front and kept a diary of her experiences. Her diary was later published as Little Grey Partridge: First World War Diary of Ishobel Ross Who Served with the Scottish Women's Hospitals in Serbia. Ross was born on the Isle of Skye and attended Edinburgh Ladies College.

== Early life ==
Ishobel Ross was born on 18 February 1890 on the Isle of Skye. She was the fourth of six children of James Ross, who developed the liqueur Drambuie.

She attended Edinburgh Ladies College and was later a teacher of cookery at the Atholl Crescent School of Domestic Science.

== World War I ==
Shortly after the outbreak of World War I in 1914, Ross heard Elsie Inglis give a lecture about the Scottish Women's Hospitals for Foreign Service.

Ross volunteered to join Inglis in Serbia for the establishment of a hospital unit at the front of the Balkans theatre. She embarked to Greece on the hospital ship Dunluce Castle and arrived in Thessaloniki on 22 August 1916. The unit joined with a group of Australians and New Zealand physician Agnes Bennett. Before joining the Scottish Women's Hospitals unit, Ross was initially trained as a cook. She learned Serbian and Russian to communicate with the soldiers. She developed sympathy for the Serbians during her time in Greece. During her time on the front, Ross met Flora Sandes, a British woman who fought with the Serbian army.

Ross returned to Britain in July 1917.

== Diary ==
Ross kept a diary during her service. The portion of Ross's diary that was published begins with her voyage to Greece and ends with her return to Britain in July 1917. Her 12 September 1916 diary entry, "The bombardment has begun", recorded the events of that day:

The guns started at 5 a.m. this morning and have gone steadily ever since. The noise is quite deafening and seems much nearer than it really is. A Serbian officer told us that we are only 5 miles from the fighting. It is awful to think that every boom means so many lives lost. They say the bombardment will continue for four or five days. Some of us went to the top of the hill tonight and saw the flashes from the guns. What a gorgeous night too, with the moon shining and the hills looking so lovely. The thought of so much killing and chaos so near to all this beauty made me feel very sad.

During her time with the unit, Ross joined Ingles in visiting the trenches where they buried some of the fallen soldiers. Ross later wrote in her diary, "What a terrible sight it was to see the bodies half buried and all the place strewn with bullets, letter cases, gas masks, empty shells and daggers."

== Legacy ==
Ross married and had a daughter, Jess Dixon. After Ross died in 1965, her daughter arranged for the diary to be in the public domain and informed Aberdeen University Press of its existence. It was published as Little Grey Partridge: First World War Diary of Ishobel Ross Who Served with the Scottish Women's Hospitals in Serbia in 1988. The war's nurses were given the nickname "little grey partridges" by the soldiers. The diary received a scathing review from Lesley Hall in Medical History, who lamented the lack of vivid descriptions and wrote that "from her description, serving in a field hospital on the Serbian Front was closely equivalent to a Girl Guide Camp".
