= Ruth Holden =

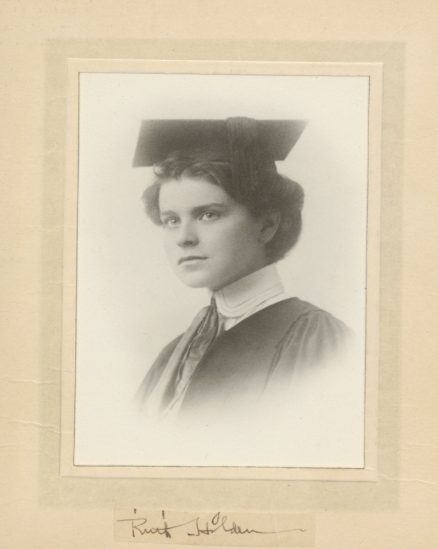
- Graduation photo of Ruth Holden c.1911
- Born: November 27, 1890; Attleboro, Massachusetts, U.S.
- Died: April 21, 1917 (aged 26); Kazan, Russia
- Occupations: paleobotanist, nurse

Ruth Holden (November 27, 1890 – April 21, 1917) was an American paleobotanist and nurse, who died in Russia during World War I.

== Biography ==
Ruth Holden was born on November 27, 1890, in the city of Attleboro, Massachusetts. She grew up in the city with her parents Charles and Caroline Holden. She had two siblings, an older sister, Alice, and a younger brother, John. Her father was a doctor.

She was educated at Attleborough High School where she was valedictorian of the class of 1907; she then studied at Radcliffe College, Harvard. She graduated from Radcliffe in 1911 and received her MA the following year. While at Radcliffe she studied Paleobotany with Professor E. C Jeffrey. She was awarded the Caroline Wilby prize for her thesis Reduction and Reversion in the North American SalicaIes. She used the money from this and other academic prizes to pursue her interest in fossil hunting. For example, she collected fossils in Prince Edward Island and New Brunswick in Canada in the summer of 1911.

In 1912, Holden made her first trip to England where she attended a "Summer Meeting" at Cambridge University where she was able to examine their collection of fossil plants.

She returned to England in 1913 after obtaining an AAUW European Fellowship and began paleobotanical research at Newnham College, Cambridge.

Following the outbreak of the First World War, Holden began attending lectures given by the Red Cross. The Cambridge Independent Press reported that she received the first certificate for "First Aid to the Injured" on January 21, 1915. Throughout 1915 she worked part-time as an orderly at the Auxiliary Hospital in Cintra Terrace in Cambridge.

In August 1915, she was awarded an Associates' Fellowship by Newnham College. This entitled her to £100 each year for three years to enable her "to continue her work in fossil botany".

However, she decided to suspend her studies and early in 1916, joined the first Millicent Fawcett medical unit run by the Scottish Women's Hospitals for Foreign Service. The unit left London on January 29 and headed for Petrograd in Russia to set up maternity hospitals for Polish refugees. The unit consisted of Holden (assistant nurse), two doctors, a matron, three other nurses, a sanitary officer, an almoner, and a secretary. She then went on to Kazan to help set up a new hospital for Polish refugee children. She even managed to continue her research into paleobotany at the local university, however, most of her time was spent travelling throughout Russia helping to distribute supplies to different hospitals. It is believed that during these travels Ruth Holden contracted typhoid, her illness lasting for many months into 1917. Although she appeared to recover she began to suffer from tubercular meningitis and eventually died in her sleep during the evening of April 21, 1917.

Soon after news of Ruth Holden's death was announced obituaries began appearing in various media: Nature said that "Botanical science has suffered a serious loss through the death of Ruth Holden"; A C Seward (who worked with Holden in Cambridge) wrote in the New Phytologist that "though Miss Holden was a student of exceptional originality and promise she was much more than that—a chivalrous and noble woman whom it was a privilege to count a friend"; Miss Moberly, an administrator of the medical unit in Russia wrote in Common Cause (a Women's Suffrage newspaper) that "[Holden] greatly loved the people and the land for which she has given her life, and she told me more than once that nothing in the future could ever make her regret having volunteered for this work."

On October 5, 1919, a bronze tablet was unveiled in Capron Park, Attleboro, commemorating Ruth Holden alongside another nurse, Alice Illingworth Haskell, who had also died in service during the war. A memorial nursing fund was also set up in both the nurses' names.

== Published works ==
- Holden, Ruth (January 1, 1912), Reduction and Reversion in the North American Salicales. Annals of Botany, Volume os-26, Issue 1, Pages 165–173.
- Holden, Ruth (July 1, 1913), Contributions to the Anatomy Of Mesozoic Conifers No. 1 Jurassic Coniferous Woods from Yorkshire. Annals Of Botany, Volume os-27, Issue 3, Pages 533–545.
- Holden, Ruth (May 1, 1915), The Anatomy of a hybrid Equisetum. American Journal of Botany, 2: 225–233.
- Holden, Ruth (July 1, 1917), On the Anatomy of two Palaeozoic stems from India, Annals of Botany, Volume os-31, Issue 3–4, July 1, 1917, Pages 315–326
