= Ethel Moir =

Nursing orderly and diarist (1884–1973)

Ethel Mary Moir
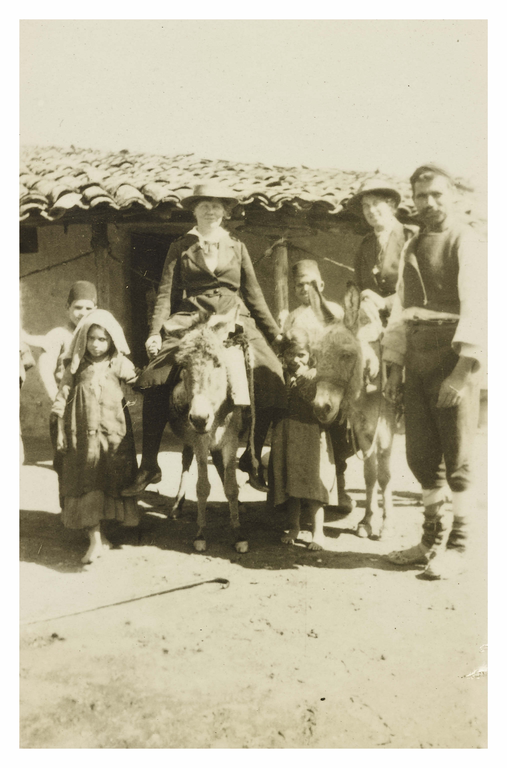
- Photograph of Scottish nursing orderly, Ethel Moir and C. Douglas from 1918 found in the diaries of Ethel Mary Moir.
- Born: 1884; Belize, Honduras
- Died: 1973 (aged 88–89)

Ethel Mary Moir (1884 - 1973), a nursing orderly who served with the Scottish Women's Hospitals for Foreign Service on the Eastern Front during World War I. Moir recorded her experiences serving with the Elsie Inglis Unit in Russia and Serbia in two volumes of diaries.

== Early life ==
Ethel Mary Moir was born in 1884 in Belize in British Honduras, one of five children born to Dr John Moir and his wife Jessie. Moir left British Honduras at the age of 3 months and travelled with her family to Scotland where she grew up in Inverness and befriended Lilias Mary Grant. Moir is recorded as residing in Inverness with her family in both the 1901 and 1911 census.

== Scottish Women's Hospital ==
In 1916, Moir and Grant enlisted with Dr Elsie Inglis unit of the Scottish Women's Hospitals for Foreign Service, known as the SWH, and the two women embarked on the troopship Hanspiel in Liverpool, sailing from there to the port of Arkhangelsk in Russia. While aboard ship Moir began recording her experiences in a diary and scrapbook which she kept for the next three years. Moir notes in her diary that the ship arrived in Arkhangelsk on 10 September 1916 and from there the unit moved upriver to Bacheridza where they were visited by local dignitaries. While in the area Moir and Grant visited a local village and Moir recorded a number of local words and customs in her diary. The unit left Bacheridza by train and travelled via Moscow to the Front where they joined the First Serbian Volunteer Division in Odessa and set up a field hospital in a barn housing 200 injured soldiers. In her diary, Muir records that the field hospital had no lighting and that water had to be carried from a pump on a hillside some distance away. In late September Moir and the SWH moved to Medgidia, close to the front line, where they set up a hospital treating both Serbian and Russian troops. By the end of 1916 Moir's unit returned to Odessa and established a hospital where Moir worked in the theatre.

In January 1917 Moir and Grant left the Front to return to Scotland, a journey that took three months. They passed through Petrograd where Moir records in her diary that people were dying of starvation and there was talk of revolution and the death of Rasputin.

Ethel arrived back in Scotland in March 1917, her ship having been diverted to Lerwick as it was carrying a cargo of zinc-spelter for munitions.

In February 1918, Ethel embarked on a second tour of duty with the Scottish Women's Hospital. Before leaving the UK the unit was inspected by King George V and Queen Mary at Buckingham Palace. Ethel left the UK with her unit on 20 February 1918 en route for Serbia. They travelled via Boulogne, Rome, Naples, and Taranto before arriving at the Scottish Women's Hospital in Salonique. While passing through Naples Ethel records a short visit to Pompeii in her diary. From Thessaloniki the unit moved on to S.W.H. “Elsie Inglis” Camp in Verbliani where a tent hospital was to be built as a direct line from the trenches.

== Fictional appearances ==
Moir and Grant's war time experiences, as recorded in their diaries, inspired the play Sea And Land And Sky by Abigail Docherty.
