= Margaret Cowie Crowe =

British nurse during World War I (1882–1973)

- Born: 23 November 1882; Laurieston, Falkirk, Scotland
- Died: 1973 (aged 90)
- Occupations: nurse who served in Serbia and Russia during World War I
- Employer(s): Falkirk Community Hospital; Nobel Enterprises; Scottish Women's Hospitals for Foreign Service

Margaret Cowie Crowe (23 November 1882–1973), also known as Meg, was a Scottish nurse who served in Serbia and Russia during World War I.

== Biography ==
Crowe was born in Laurieston, Falkirk, Scotland and was one of eight children. She was educated at Laurieston Village School and continued there as a pupil teacher. She passed the King’s Scholar exam during her studies.

After qualifying as a nurse, passing her nursing exams with distinction in 1908, she worked at Falkirk Community Hospital then as the on-site nurse at the Nobel Enterprises Explosives Factory in Ardeer, Ayrshire.

After the outbreak of World War I the Scottish Women's Hospitals for Foreign Service (SWH) was founded by Dr Elsie Inglis to support the war effort and as women medics were not permitted to serve on the frontlines. The organisation was funded by private donations, fundraising of local societies, the National Union of Women's Suffrage Societies (NUWSS) and the American Red Cross.

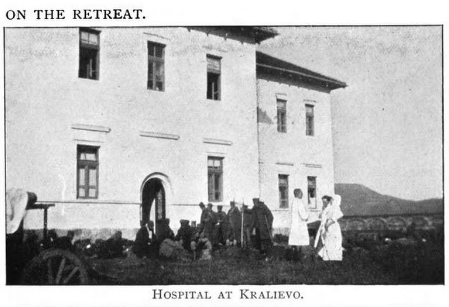
Hospital at Kraljevo

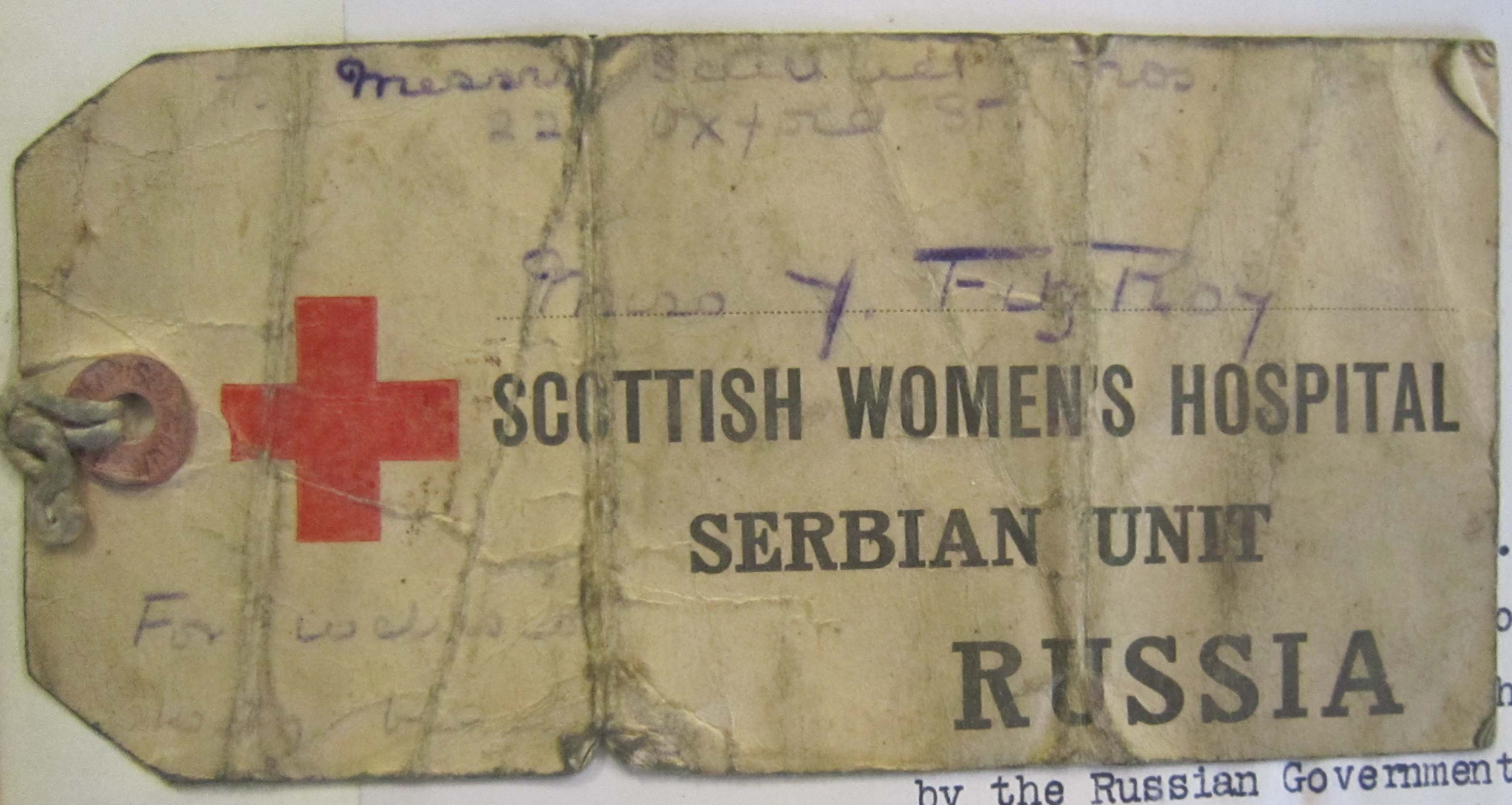
Luggage label from a pack belonging to a Scottish Women's Hospitals nurse

Crowe joined the SWH, departing for service in Serbia in February 1915. She was based at the hospital camps in Mladenavac and Kragujevac, treating a typhus epidemic. She was one of forty Scottish women medics who accompanied the Serbian Army during their "Great Retreat" across Albania fleeing from the invading Austrians. During the retreat, SWH nurse Caroline Toughill had her skull fractured when the car in which she was travelling fell off a cliff near the town of Rača. Crowe and a Serbian Major treated her in a nearby Red Cross camp, before she died from her injuries two days later and was buried at Leposavić. When Crowe reached the coast in Albania she travelled through Italy and France by boat and train to get back to Scotland. She had returned home by late December 1915.

Crowe next travelled to nurse in the Russian Empire from 1916, nursing in Saint Petersburg, Kursk and Kazan, and was in Russia during the Russian Revolution in 1917. She took photographs to record her experiences, with an annotation of "Passport Photograph required under Bolshevik Rule" on one of her images. She also learned to speak the Russian language.

After the war, she returned to work at the Nobel Enterprises Explosives Factory until her retirement in 1943., when her employers presented her with what the Falkirk Herald described as a "handsome gift. The same article also described in detail her experience in Serbia and Russia, where she supported the British Armoured Car Unit as their only Sister. Crowe also joined a newly formed Russian nurses' organisation, and in Great Britain was a founder member of the Royal College of Nursing.

Crowe died in 1973.

== Legacy ==
Crowe was featured in WW100 Scotland and was commemorated at a "ceremony saluting the pioneering Scots nurses of World War I" during 2017.
