= Scottish Women's Hospitals for Foreign Service =

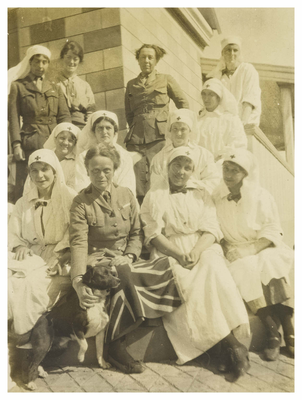
- Elsie Inglis and other members of the SWH

History
- Founded: 1914
- Closed: 1919

The Scottish Women's Hospitals for Foreign Services (SWH) was founded in 1914. It was led by Dr Elsie Inglis and provided nurses, doctors, ambulance drivers, cooks and orderlies. By the end of World War I, 14 medical units had been outfitted and sent to serve in Corsica, France, Malta, Romania, Russia, Salonika and Serbia.

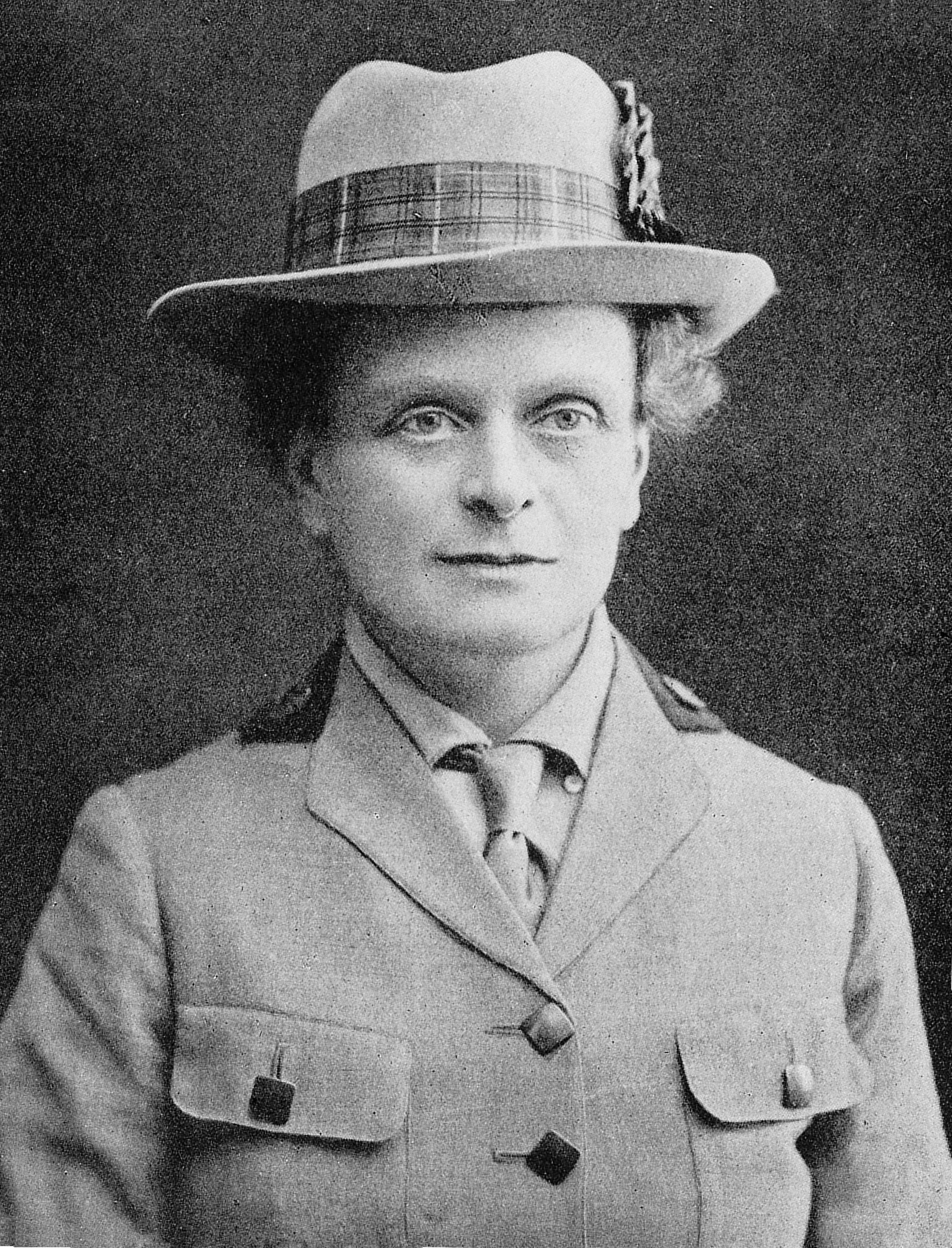
Dr Elsie Inglis

== Beginnings ==
At the outset of the war, Dr Elsie Inglis was secretary for the Scottish Federation of Women Suffrage Societies, affiliated with the National Union of Women's Suffrage Societies (NUWSS) headed by Millicent Garrett Fawcett. The SWH was spearheaded by Dr Inglis, as part of a wider suffrage effort from the Scottish Federation of the National Union of Women's Suffrage Societies and funded by private donations, fundraising of local societies, the National Union of Women's Suffrage Societies and the American Red Cross.

Fawcett wished to include "Women's Suffrage" in the name, but Inglis opposed this on the grounds that "suffrage" had controversial political connotations based on the example of those who advocated civil disobedience such as Emmeline Pankhurst. While not all volunteers supported the suffrage movement, the letters "NUWSS" appeared on SWH letterhead and many of their vehicles, and the French press often referred to their facilities as "Hospital of the Scottish Suffragists", and the NUWSS provided financial support.

Initial fundraising was highly successful after Fawcett invited Inglis to speak in London, and by the end of August 1914 they had raised more than £5,000. Established shortly after the outbreak of World War I as voluntary all-women units, the Scottish Women's Hospitals offered opportunities for medical women who were prohibited from entry into the Royal Army Medical Corps.

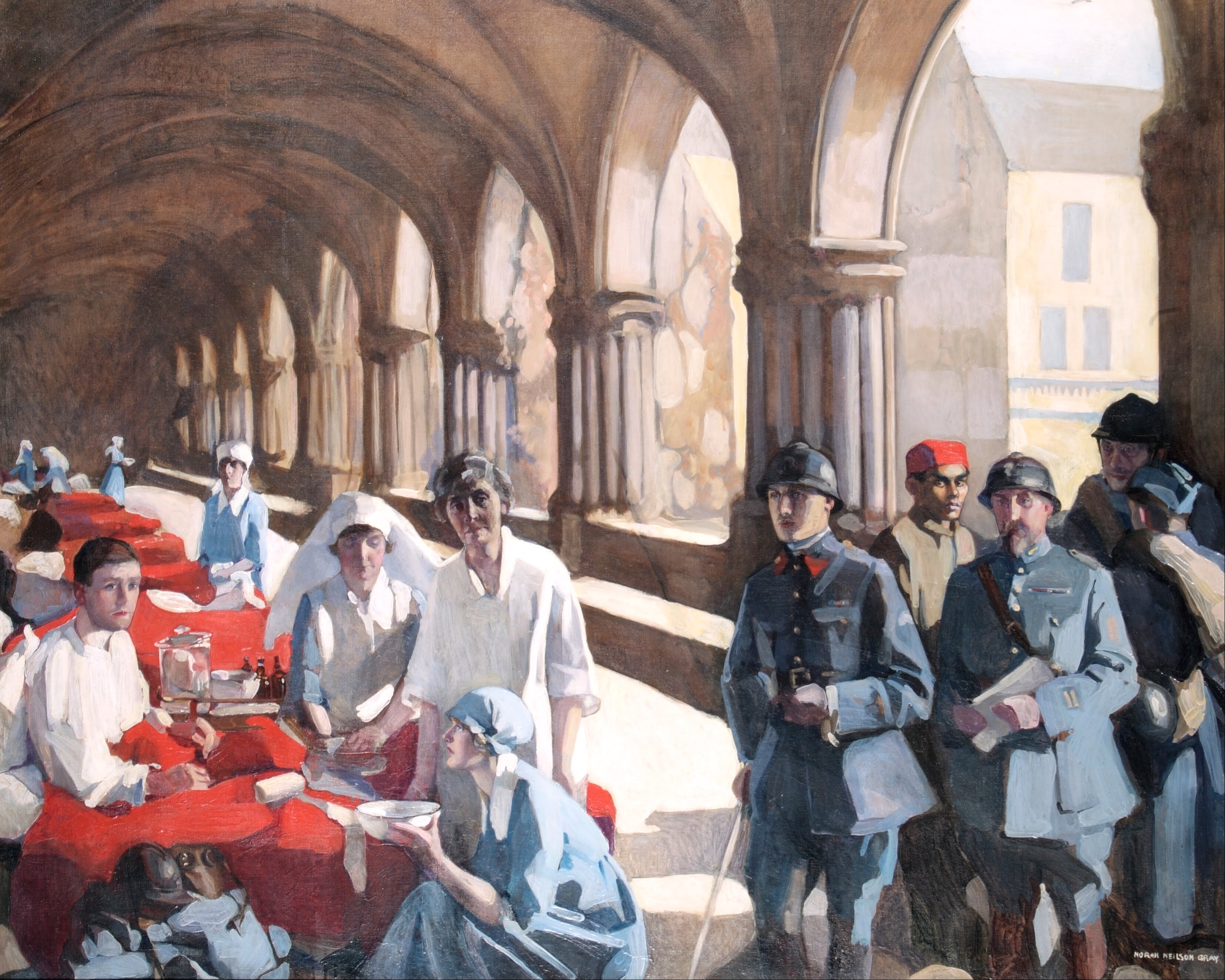
Dr Frances Ivens inspecting a French patient at the Scottish Women's Hospital at Royaumont. Painting by Norah Neilson Gray.

The headquarters were in Edinburgh throughout the war, and there were also committees in Glasgow and London, working closely with the London office of the Croix Rouge Francaise (French Red Cross).

Dr Alice Hutchison was the first doctor of SWH sent to France to establish the first hospital. She initially placed it in Boulogne. While searching for a building for a hospital, a typhoid epidemic broke out amongst Belgian refugees in Calais. She, along with another doctor and ten nurses, treated the patients. She was noted for having the lowest rate of deaths of typhoid in her hospital.

In December 1914, a hospital was established with 200-beds at Royaumont Abbey, known as Scottish Women's Hospital at Royaumont, officially called Hôpital Auxiliaire 301. The initial staff included Inglis, Alice Hutchison, Ishobel Ross, Cicely Hamilton, Marian Gamwell, and Katherine Harley. The Scottish Women's Hospitals serviced 14 medical units across mainland France and Corsica, Malta, Romania, Russia, Salonika and Serbia. In April 1915, Dr Inglis was head of a unit based in Serbia. Within seven months of mobilising, the SWH were servicing 1,000 beds with 250 staff which included 19 female doctors.

== France ==
The first Scottish Women's Hospital was, in November 1914, staffed, equipped and established at Calais to support the Belgian Army. Vicomtess de la Panouse, wife of the French military attaché to the French embassy in London helped the group identify another location at the ancient Royaumont Abbey. The abbey was the property of Édouard Goüin, a rich industrialist and philanthropist whose poor health rendered him unable to fight. By December a second hospital was based there. It remained operational throughout the war and treated wounded from the French Army under the direction of the French Red Cross. A further hospital was opened at Troyes (Château de Chanteloup, Sainte-Savine) and Villers-Cotterets along with the popular and supportive canteens at Creil, Soissons and Crepy-en-Valois.

== Serbia ==
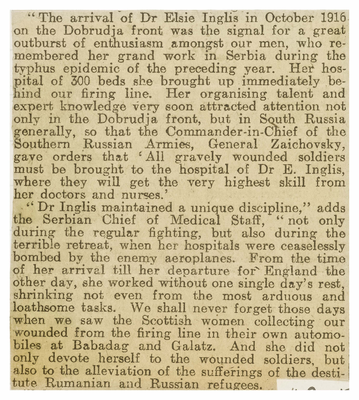
Newspaper cutting from The Scotsman (1916) describing the work of Dr Elsie Inglis in Serbia

Also in December, a hospital led by Dr Eleanor Soltau was dispatched to Serbia. Other units quickly followed and Serbia soon had four primary hospitals working night and day. The conditions in Serbia were dire. The Serbian army had a mere 300 doctors to serve more than half a million men, and as well as battle casualties the hospital had to deal with a typhus epidemic which ravaged the military and civilian populations. Serbia had fought a surprisingly successful military campaign against the invading Austrians but the fight had exhausted the nation. Both soldiers and civilians were half starved and worn out and in those conditions diseases thrived and hundreds of thousands perished.

From December 1914 to November 1915, the hospital was based in Kragujevac. The Imperial War Museum's "Lives of the First World War" has a list of all those who worked in that location.

Four SWH staff, Louisa Jordan, Madge Fraser, Augusta Minshull and Bessie Sutherland died during the epidemic, the first two are buried in Niš Commonwealth Military Cemetery. By the winter of 1915 Serbia could hold out no more. The Austrians had been joined by German and Bulgarian forces who again invaded, and the Serbs were forced to retreat into Albania.

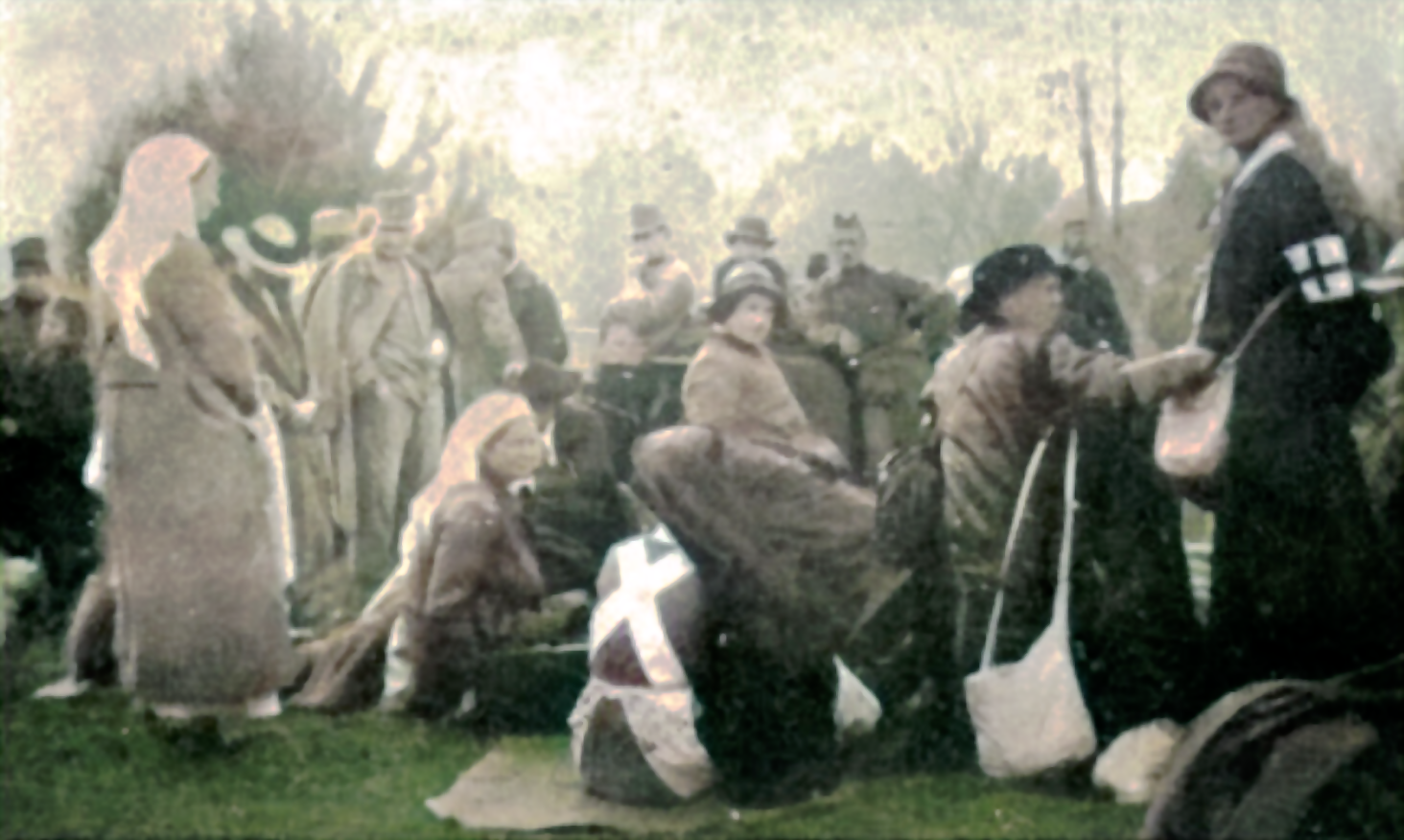

The SWH staff had a choice to make: stay and go into captivity or go with the retreating army into Albania. In the end some stayed and some went. Elsie Inglis, Evelina Haverfield, Alice Hutchison, Helen MacDougall and others were taken prisoner and were eventually repatriated to Britain. The others joined the Serbian army and government in its retreat and suffered the indescribable horrors of that retreat and shared the hardships endured by the Serbian army.

=== Serbian view of the SWH. ===
Common Cause published the translated version of an anonymous writer's admiration for the women: "even in the sad days of our tragedy they did not forsake us...." and "it shows us in the highest degree the greatness of the role taken on by the modern woman in this tragic fight of nations, races and principle"

=== The March ===
The Serbian army retreated over the mountains of Albania and Montenegro in the depths of winter with no food, shelter or help, and thousands upon thousands of soldiers, civilians, and prisoners of war died during the retreat. One SWH nurse, Caroline Toughill, had her skull fractured when the car in which she was travelling fell off a cliff near the town of Rača. Despite treatment by a Serbian major and another passenger from the car, (nurse Margaret Cowie Crowe) in a Red Cross camp to which she was taken, she died. and was buried on a mountain-top with a priest and Serbian soldiers attending the funeral. She was buried in a soldier's coffin. Those who made it to the safety of the Adriatic Sea continued to give what help they could to soldiers, civilians, and in particular to the many boys who had joined the retreat. As a direct consequence of this, the SWH set up a convalescent hospital in Corsica in December 1915 to help displaced Serb women and children.

== Salonika ==
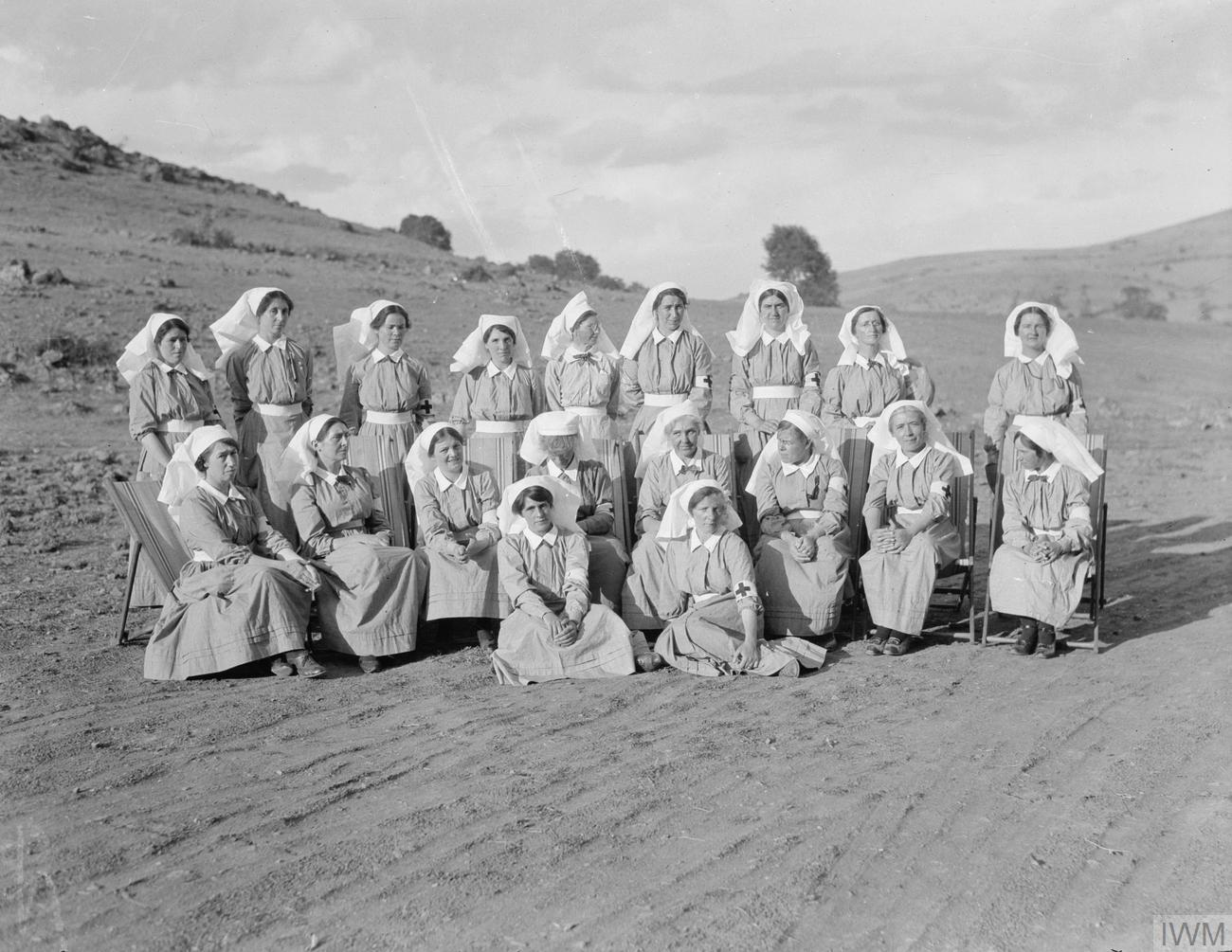
Women of the Sixth (American) Unit of the Scottish Women's Hospital at Ostrovo

During this period the hospital at Troyes in France was ordered to pack. Designed as a mobile rather than a fixed hospital it was equipped with tents and vehicles. It was attached to a division of the French army and was dispatched to Salonika in Greece when their French division was transferred there as part of a belated move by the Allies to provide practical help to the beleaguered Serbs. The hospital (known as the Girton & Newnham Unit after the Cambridge University women's colleges which funded it) was set up in a disused silkworm factory in the border town of Gevgelia, though it soon had to be relocated to the city of Salonika when the rapid Bulgarian advance threatened. Much of the work at Salonika was spent fighting malaria, a huge killer made worse by the lack of suitable clothing supplied by the Allied armies. Some staff also died of dysentery, like Sister Mary Burt in 1916.

It was joined in August 1916 there by the Ostrovo Unit or the American Unit. This hospital was funded chiefly by American donors and was so named in gratitude to them. The unit was moved in early September 90 miles north–west of Salonika to Lake Ostrovo (now Lake Vegoritida in Greece), and supported the Serbian Army's push back into its homeland. Also sent to Ostrovo was a Transport Column. This was a motor ambulance unit which allowed SWH to collect casualties quickly rather than wait for casualties to be brought to them, including volunteer women motor ambulance drivers, like Elsie Cameron Corbett.

== Russia ==
Following her repatriation to the UK in February 1916, Dr Inglis set about equipping and staffing a hospital to serve in Russia. Other veterans of the first Serbian hospital, including Dr Lilian Chesney and Evelina Haverfield, joined her. A hospital and attendant transport column of ambulances and support vehicles was sent to Russia. It served in southern Russia (Bessarabia and Moldova) and in Romania, providing medical care chiefly to the Serbian Division of the Russian army. This division was primarily made up of volunteers from the Serbian diaspora along with ethnic Serbian and south Slavic prisoners of war from the Austro-Hungarian army, who after their capture by Russia sought the opportunity to fight for their people. The Serb division had no medical facilities so these were provided by SWH to some 11,000 men with only seven doctors. Led by Elsie Inglis who had a strong affinity to the Serbian army and people and was recognised in their highest award (The Serbian Order of the White Eagle) for her service, the SWH staff once again endured the hardship of the war when they had to take part in a chaotic and painful retreat after the Romanian army was routed in 1917. Russia was then plunged into revolution and, when it became clear that the Russian army was unlikely to resume operations, the hospital was withdrawn. A division of Serb soldiers and officers, along with Inglis, sailed from Archangel through submarine infested waters to the UK. Tragically, the day after they arrived back in Britain, Elsie Inglis, who had been very sick with bowel cancer for some time, died. Soon after the Elsie Inglis Unit was established in her memory and sent out to join the Girton & Newnham and the American units both providing medical support to the Serb army in Macedonia. Together they provided much needed help during the campaigns of 1918 which saw the Serbs and their British, French, Russian, Greek and Italian allies drive the Germans, Austro-Hungarians and Bulgarians out of Macedonia and Serbia.

== Closing Years ==
Towards the end of the war SWH in Serbia itself provided medical help to soldiers, civilians, and prisoners of war (as well as continuing to provide care to refugees in Corsica and at the TB hospital in Sallanches in France). A new fixed hospital was established in Vranje for 300 patients, but by early 1919 this had been handed over to the Serbian authorities - more or less bringing to an end the SWH. While most SWH members went home and resumed their pre war lives, many SWH staff and ‘veterans’ chose to stay on to provide much needed medical care in Serbia. Dr Katherine Stewart MacPhail opened a hospital for sick children in Belgrade (and continued this work until forced out by Tito's government in 1947); Evelina Haverfield ran a hospital for orphans until her tragic death in March 1920; and some others did what they could to help, often using their own money, to single-handedly help destitute soldiers, refugees, or the many orphans and widows who were all in desperate need of assistance. Others did relief work elsewhere. Isabel Emslie Hutton, for example, went to work with refugees from the Russian Civil War in Crimea.

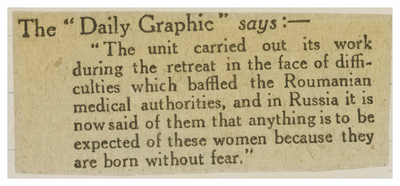
The Daily Graphic – press cutting 1916 praising the work of the SWH in Romania and Russia

== Impact ==
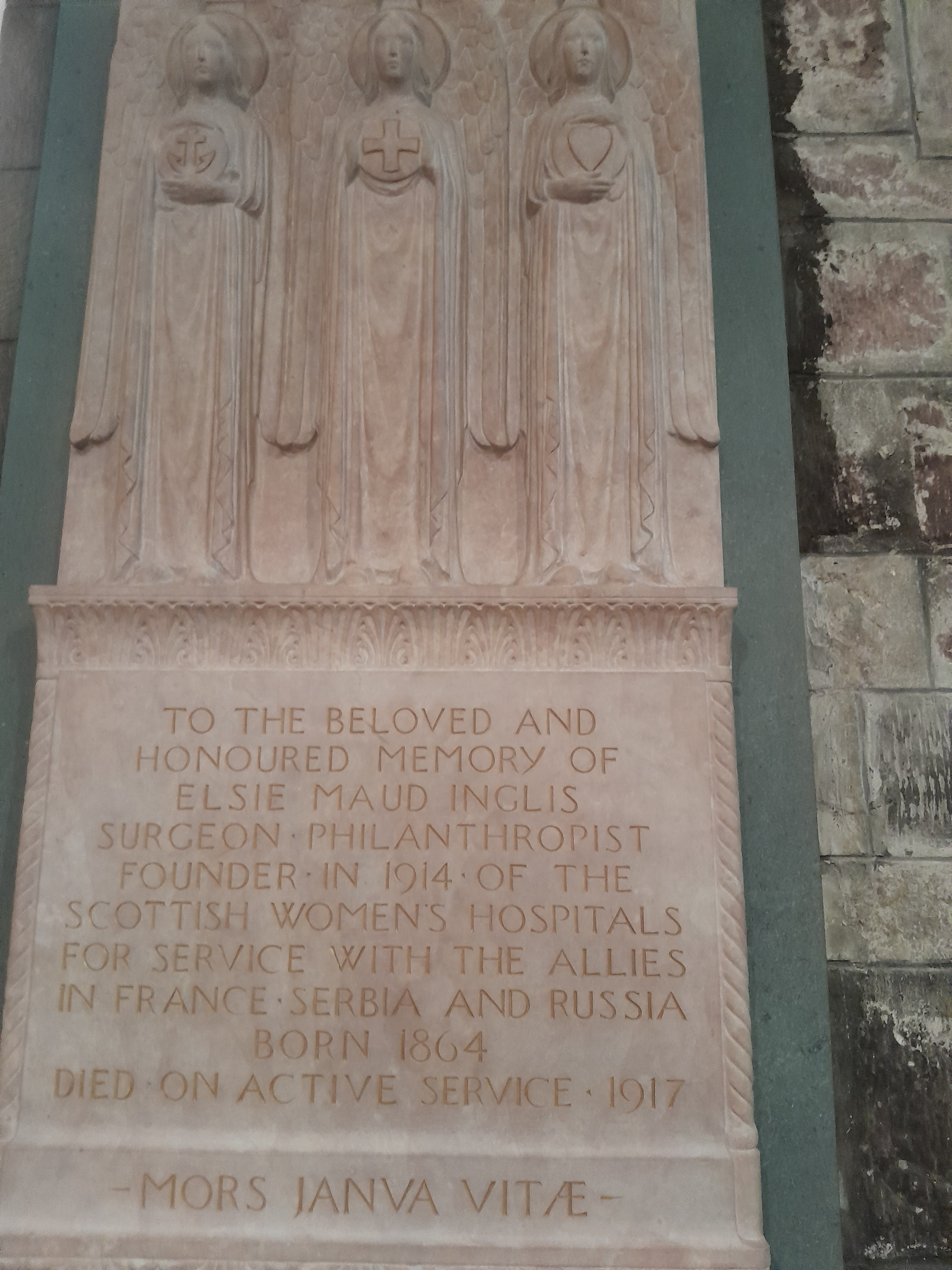
Memorial plaque in St. Giles' Cathedral in Edinburgh

Over 1,000 women from many different backgrounds and many different countries served with the SWH. Only the medical professionals such as doctors, nurses, laboratory technicians, and x-ray operators received a salary and expenses; while non-medical staff such as orderlies, administrators, drivers, cooks, and others received no pay at all (and were in fact expected to pay their way).

In keeping with the aims of the SWH it was a deliberate policy that, as far as possible, all members of SWH units should be women, so allowing opportunities for unqualified women who could nonetheless get the chance to both serve the war effort in some capacity and the cause of women's rights. Some women joined because it was one of the few opportunities open to women to help the war effort; others saw it as a chance for adventure in a world that up till then offered women few chances; and all shared, with varying degrees, the desire to improve the lot of women. Over £500,000 was raised to fund the organisation and during the war years it is estimated that hundreds of thousands of patients' lives were save; all nursed and helped by the SWH.

In 2025 the erection of a statue to Elsie Inglis was approved by members of the City of Edinburgh Council's development management sub committee. Some of Inglis's last words included "not me, my unit" in answer to praise of her work. The statue will honour the 1,500 women volunteers who served with the Scottish Women's Hospitals for Foreign Service from Scotland, New Zealand, Australia, and Canada.

== Notable Women Volunteers ==
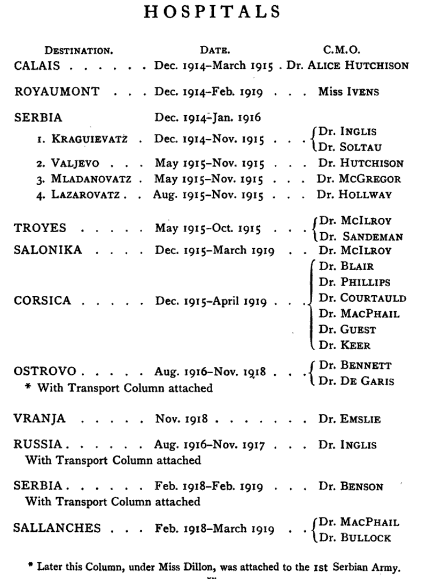

- Wilhelmina Hay Abbott, fundraiser for the Scottish Women's Hospitals
- Louisa Aldrich-Blake, British surgeon (later worked in obstetrics and gynaecology),
- Millicent Sylvia Armstrong, Australian orderly
- Mary Josephine Bedford, Australian ambulance driver
- Jean Aitken Bell, Scottish nurse
- Elizabeth Bertram, Scottish nurse
- Agnes Bennett, Australian doctor
- Mary Alice Blair, New Zealand doctor and Head of Unit
- Elsie Bowerman, British ambulance driver
- Mary Annie de Burgh Burt, British nurse sister
- Florence Missouri Caton, British nurse
- Vera Christina Chute Collum, British X-ray assistant
- Elsie Cameron Corbett, British ambulance driver
- Lilian Violet Cooper, Australian doctor
- Elizabeth Courtauld, British doctor
- C Muriel Craigie, British headquarters administrator
- Margaret Cowie Crowe, Scottish nurse
- Elsie Jean Dalyell, Australian doctor
- Georgina Davidson, Scottish doctor
- Margaret Charlotte Davidson, Scottish orderly then nurse
- Mabel Dearmer, British orderly
- Mary De Garis, Australian doctor
- Violet Douglas-Pennant, British philanthropist
- Yvonne Fitzroy, British nurse
- Miles Franklin, Australian cook
- Margaret Neill Fraser, Scottish nurse
- Norah Neilson Gray, Scottish nurse and artist
- Edith Hacon, Scottish housekeeper
- Kathleen Burke Hale, British fundraiser decorated by 7 countries
- Helen Hanson, British physician, missionary, suffragist
- Mabel Hardie, British surgeon
- Katherine Harley, British nurse
- Evelina Haverfield, British nurse
- Maud Doria Haviland, British chauffeur, ornithologist and anthropologist
- Mary H. J. Henderson, Scottish unit administrator and war poet
- Lydia Manley Henry, Scottish surgeon
- Ruth Holden, American paleobotanist, nurse
- Vera "Jack" Holme, British ambulance driver
- Laura Margaret Hope, Australian doctor
- Alice Hutchison, British doctor
- Isabel Emslie Hutton, British doctor
- Elsie Inglis, British doctor and founder of the Scottish Women's Hospitals
- Kathleen Innes, British Quaker, educator, writer, pacifist - orderly and administrator
- Frances Ivens, British chief medical officer
- Louisa Jordan, Scottish nurse
- Honoria Somerville Keer, British surgeon
- Olive Kelso King, Australian ambulance driver
- Sybil Lewis, British doctor, from Hull but trained in Edinburgh
- Rotha Lintorn-Orman, British ambulance driver
- Henrietta Lister, British racecar driver and artist
- Hilda Lorimer, British classical scholar - orderly
- Kate Luard, British Nurse
- Edith McKay, Australian nurse
- Mary Lauchline McNeill, Scottish doctor and suffragist
- Alexandrina Matilda MacPhail, Scottish doctor
- Katherine Stewart MacPhail, Scottish doctor
- Louise McIlroy, Irish-born British physician,
- Louisa Martindale, British physician and surgeon
- Caroline Matthews, British doctor
- Ethel Moir, Scottish nursing orderly
- Harriet Christina Newcomb, British-Australian committee member
- Ruth Nicholson, British Assistant surgeon
- Grace Pailthorpe, British surrealist painter, surgeon, psychology researcher
- Hilda Petrie, British archaeologist, honorary secretary for the Scottish Women's Hospitals
- Mary Elizabeth Phillips, Welsh doctor
- Alma Rattenbury, British orderly and murder accused
- Elizabeth Ness MacBean Ross, British doctor
- Laura Sandeman, Scottish doctor
- Jessie Ann Scott, New Zealand doctor
- Olive Smith, British masseuse
- Eleanor Soltau, Unit leader to Serbia and British doctor
- Mabel St Clair Stobart, British Unit Head and Major
- Edith Stoney, Irish radiographer
- Leslie Joy Whitehead, Canadian soldier

== Archives ==
Elsie Inglis' archives are held at the Mitchell Library in Glasgow, including the SWH Archives collected by the organisation's Honorary Treasurer, Jessie Laurie. A large cardboard box, ref TD1734/20/4, containing many individual accounts of the flight from Serbia, can also be found there. In June 2022, Archivist Barbara Neilson posted a summarised account of the SWH collection as part of a Glasgow Life Times Past series.

Scottish Women's Hospital Archives are also held at The Women's Library at the Library of the London School of Economics, ref 2SWH The Women's Library also holds a Scrapbook on Scottish Women's Hospital from the time, ref 10/22. Papers of individuals who were part of SWH now held at The Women's Library include the Papers of Elsie Bowerman ref 7ELB the Papers of Vera "Jack" Holme ref 7VJH, as well as individual books, postcards and photographs related to the Scottish Women's Hospital and of several of the women who served.

The Women's Work Collection at the Imperial War Museum holds many photographs of the SWH.

Additional SWH members' materials are held in various archive offices: memoirs of Katherine North née Hodges are in the Leeds Russian Archive; the journals of Mary Lee Milne are held by the National Library of Scotland, papers of Lilas Grant and Ethel Moir are in the Central Library, Edinburgh; the Lothian Health Archives hold the letters of Yvonne Fitzroy and more than sixty other documents relating to the hospital; a Photograph album relating to the Scottish Women's Hospital in Salonika, 1907–1918 (ref RCPSG 74) is held at the Royal College of Physicians and Surgeons of Glasgow, whilst the Schlesinger Library, Harvard University holds the papers of Ruth Holden. The Public Record Office of Northern Ireland also holds papers of the Scottish Women's Hospitals in Serbia papers ref D1982. The National Library of Scotland holds film footage of a Scottish Women's Hospitals unit in action and Scottish Screen has a documentary silent film, 'one of the earliest documentaries' of the front line medical and nursing activities, taken at the SWH units in Villers-Cotterês and in Salonika.

== Further Information ==
=== Entries in "First World War Women" website ===
In its "Gallantry" section, the website "First World War Women" has biographies of Kate Luard, Yvonne Fitzroy, and Beatrice Hopkinson, with links to related diaries and YouTube presentations. Fitzroy's book "With the Scottish Nurses in Roumania" can be downloaded from the Glasgow Trades House Library.

=== Return to UK of Scottish Nurses ===
The Nursing Times of 1st January 1916 has an extended account of the return to the UK of medical staff returning from Serbia after their six week journey. Stating that most of them were "Scotch", it includes interviews with Janet Middleton and Sister Elizabeth Atkinson of the Unit, and extracts from accounts and interviews originally published in newspapers such as the Daily Telegraph, the Manchester Guardian and the Morning Post, whose article had an interview with Dr Lilian Chesney. In the same edition, the Nursing Tines published a complete list of the medical staff who had returned.

== Reims Monument and Roll of Honour ==
The city of Reims has erected a monument to French and allied nurses killed on active service in France. It stands in Place Ceres on the former main road. Also maintained in the city archives is a Roll of Honour with all their names, arranged by their country of birth.
