= Elizabeth Bertram =

Nursing sister

- Born: 1874; Hawick
- Died: 1954; Hawick
- Education: the Cumberland Hospital Carlisle and the Royal Maternity Hospital Edinburgh
- Known for: Working for the Scottish Women's Hospital in Serbia and Corsica

Elizabeth Bertram (1874-1954) was a nursing sister with the Scottish Women's Hospital for Foreign Service in Serbia and Corsica.

== Pre-war work as teacher and nurse ==
Elizabeth Bertram was born in Hawick on 4 January 1874.

The Hawick Paper of 2 July 2021 includes an article by Alistair Redpath about Bertram in which he records that the Census of 1891 notes her occupation as a pupil teacher. The Southern Reporter also notes that she had been involved in running Continuation classes in the pre-war period. The Hawick News and Border Chronicle gives more detail, noting that the classes were in home nursing and took place both in Buccleuch and separately under the auspices of the Galashiels School Board.

Bertram decided to undertake formal training as a nurse, training in the Cumberland Hospital Carlisle and the Royal Maternity Hospital in Edinburgh.

Bertram gave at least two series of publicly advertised lectures in nursing in Hawick; the latter in 1912.

== The Scottish Women’s Hospital ==
In 1915, Bertram joined the Scottish Women's Hospital. She was posted to Serbia, where she worked as a sister and fever nurse under Dr Elsie Inglis. Later in the year, she was even nearer the front line, working just a few miles away and having to be evacuated under aerial and ground attack.

Bertram was one of many the clinical staff faced with an impossible choice; to go into Austrian captivity, or to try to escape over the 7000 ft (2000m) high mountains. Bertram is quoted in Angela Smith's "British women of the Eastern Front: War," describing the continuous heavy snow, and the desolate landscape, which Bertram said was a “perfect wilderness of white”. Her diary, which is in the Imperial War Museum, includes details of the long journey through the Albanian and Montenegrin Alps; before finally reaching Italy. Bertram also chronicled the fate of the wounded and the many young boys who lost their lives. One of her Scottish colleagues, Mrs Toughill from Edinburgh, also died when her bullock- drawn carriage fell over a cliff.

The Edinburgh Evening News of 22 December 1915 notes that Bertram was one of 28 nursing and ancillary staff who had lately arrived safely in Turin, The paper lists all of their names; relatives would be anxious to scan it to see who was on the list and therefore safe.

Bertram's photograph appeared on the front page of the Christmas Day 1915 edition of the Daily Record; she is pictured in her uniform with the caption “Heroic Nurse”. Three other Scottish nurses who returned from the front are pictured separately on the same page: the other nurses' surnames were Bell, Neish and Gordon. In the course of an interview on page 6 of the same newspaper, the reporter notes that Nurse Gordon was from Garmouth in Moray, and the other two nurses both from Edinburgh. Also on the same page is a photograph and short item of another woman still in Serbia-the Honourable Elsie Cameron Corbett .

Bertram shared her experiences in different media; for example in detail in The Hawick News and Border Chronicle from a talk she gave in St James Hall, Hawick. Bertram explained that she had arrived in Kragujevac in May 1915. After an initial period working in the fever hospital, she was transferred to a surgical unit. There she remained until the bombardment of the town by Austrian artillery forced everyone to evacuate the area. During this retreat, Bertram and the other nurses treated more than a hundred wounded a day. For many days, they also marched up to twenty miles per day, through the mountains; sometimes finding good food supplies but at other times having to pay large sums of money for poor quality bread. Bertram concluded her account by noting that their challenges were nothing compared to those of the Serbian men, women and children, who had lost their entire country.

Collections were taken at her talks, to support the work of the Women's Hospital in Serbia, with £6.13s (equivalent of around £400 today or 20 days wages) being raised from just one event in January 1916 for the hospital.

A lecture by Bertram later that month was illustrated with lantern slides, showing the hospital she had worked in while in Serbia and included images of nurses, patients and local scenes. The Chairman stated is his remarks that Dr Elsie Inglis, at that time a prisoner, deserved the Victoria Cross.

Bertram also gave lectures in Bonnybridge and Dennyloanhead; the latter to the local British Women's Temperance Association

== District Nurse appointment and Corsica ==
Bertram was then appointed as a local district nurse for the area; however after the death of her brother, she instead went out to Corsica to help Serbian refugees who had been evacuated to the island. Bertram stayed there until 1919. She served in the Scottish Military Hospital situated in Ajaccio. This was a very large hospital with 2000 Serb patients under the care of the medical and nursing staff. The Corsica Unit was led by Dr Mary Blair and later Dr Mary Phillips.

The unit was first of all based in a monastery, but this proved unsuitable, so it moved to larger premises, and three departments were organised - surgical, maternity and infectious diseases. In addition to medical and nursing staff, there was an X-Ray technician, a sanitary technician and cooks, drivers and other ancillary staff. The hospital continued in operation until April 1919, and when it was closed down and Bertram also returned home.

On 4 May 1916, Bertram became a Red Cross volunteer, according to that organisation's records. With the exception of her name and Hawick address, all that the website provides is her date of joining the organisation: 4 May 1916

In November of the same year, Bertram wrote with photographs from Corsica to the organiser of the Hawick organisation supporting the hospital's fundraising, which was published in The Hawick News including a letter from a Serb soldier, who was confined to the bed that was sponsored by Hawick. The soldier, whose name is unstated, noted that when he fled, he had left his close relatives behind.

== Emigration to Canada ==
After a brief return to Scotland, Bertram chose to go to Canada to continue in her nursing career, where her brother Charles was a doctor. Bertram returned permanently to Scotland later in life, dying in Hawick in 1954.

== Return to Scotland ==
Bertram was certainly in Hawick in 1934 when The Southern Reporter noted that she had recently delivered a talk about her Serbian experiences; this was in the context of an interview with the chair of a newly formed Women's Social Club. The lecture must have been appreciated, as it was recommended to be repeated from time to time.
