= Edith McKay =

Australian author and WWI nurse (1891-1963)

- Born: Gladys Edith McKay; 20 February 1891; Rockhampton
- Died: 30 January 1963 (aged 71)
- Other name: Edith Dithmack
- Known for: writer and nurse at Scottish Women's Hospitals for Foreign Service
- Notable work: The House of Winston Blaker (1947)
- Awards: Radio short story award 1949

Gladys Edith McKay (20 February 1891 – 30 January 1963) was an Australian writer and nurse who served in Serbia during World War I. McKay is best known for her 1947 novel "The House of Winston Blaker".

== Biography ==
McKay was born in Rockhampton, Queensland. She worked as a solicitor's clerk in Bundaberg before settling in the Boonah district.

During World War I, McKay volunteered as a nurse and was sent overseas to Gallipoli and Serbia with the Scottish Women's Hospitals for Foreign Service.

Her 1947 novel The House of Winston Blaker received mostly positive reviews nationally and was later adapted by the Australian Broadcasting Corporation as a radio serial.

McKay was also known for her short stories, written under the name of Edith Dithmack. More than 120 of McKay's short stories were broadcast on ABC Radio in the 1940s. In 1949, McKay won the ABC's short story competition in 1949 for Faith.

ABC Radio adapted another of McKay's works into a serial format in 1952. Unborn Tomorrow, inspired by the history of Kanaka labour on the Queensland sugarcane fields, was aired from Monday to Friday at 8:45 a.m.

She died in 1963.

== See also ==
- Other notable women volunteers in the Scottish Women's Hospitals for Foreign Service
- Women in World War I
- Australian women in World War I
- The Serbian campaign (1914-1915)
