= Laura Margaret Hope =

Australian surgeon and missionary (1868–1952)

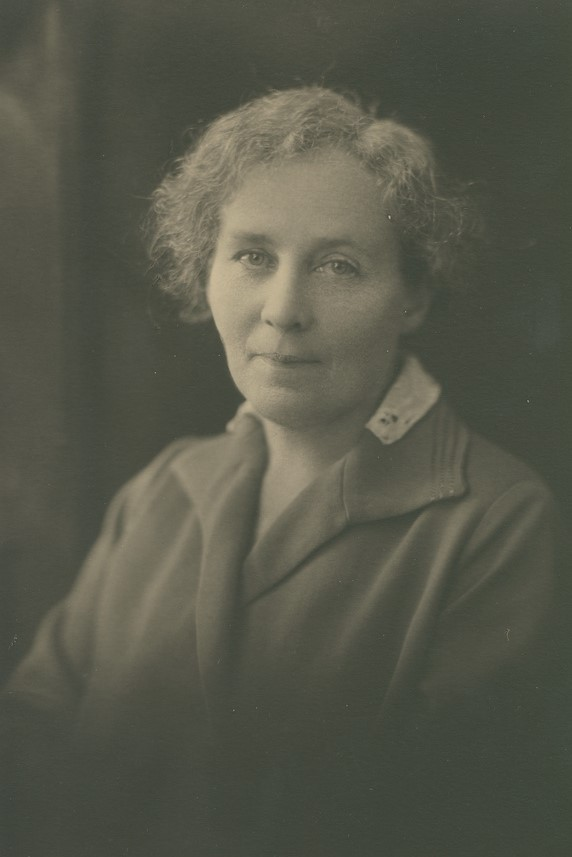
- Born: Laura Margaret Fowler; 3 May 1868; Mitcham, South Australia
- Died: 14 September 1952 (aged 84); North Adelaide, South Australia
- Education: Madame Marval's Private School University of Adelaide
- Occupation: Surgeon
- Relatives: George Swan Fowler (father)
- Medical career
- Institutions: Adelaide Children's Hospital Scottish Women's Hospitals for Foreign Service Australian Baptist Mission, Pubna New Zealand Baptist Mission Hospital, Chandpur Bengal Baptist Mission, Kalimpong
- Awards: Elder Prize Serbian Samaritan Cross Kaisar-i-Hind

Laura Margaret Hope (3 May 1868 – 14 September 1952), formerly Laura Margaret Fowler, was an Australian surgeon who worked at the Adelaide Children's Hospital and the house surgeon. She served in World War I as a doctor in Serbia, before being captured and spending three months as a prisoner of war. She was awarded the Serbian Samaritan Cross. She devoted over thirty years to medical and Baptist missionary work in Bengal and Serbia. for which she was awarded the Kaisar-i-Hind medal.

Hope was the first woman to graduate in medicine and surgery at the University of Adelaide and Australia's first woman surgeon.

== Early life ==
Hope was born Laura Margaret Fowler in the Adelaide suburb of Mitcham, South Australia to Scottish born parents George Swan Fowler and Catherine Janet Lamb. As a child, she helped her father, a successful wholesale grocer, to breed leeches for sale to pharmacists on the family's estate in Glen Osmond.

== Education ==
Hope was educated privately, initially attending Madame Marval's private school in Adelaide as well as schools in England while her brother attended Cambridge University. The family returned to Adelaide in 1884 and she matriculated in 1886.

In 1887 Hope became the first woman to enrol in medicine at the University of Adelaide. She was awarded the Elder Prize and graduated in Medicine and Surgery in 1891.

== Career ==
Hope was appointed the House Surgeon at the Adelaide Children's Hospital where she worked until she convinced her fiancé, Dr. Charles Henry Standish Hope (1861–1942), to travel with her to do missionary work in India, so they married on 4 July 1893 and travelled to Bengal.

Hope spent many years working on missions in India, particularly in Bengal where, with Charles, she would spend 30 years providing medical assistance to the local community. The couple frequently treated cases of typhoid, cholera and malaria and Charles became well known for his expertise in performing eye surgery.

=== World War I service ===
In 1915 Hope and Charles served in World War I as doctors in the Scottish Women's Hospitals for Foreign Service (SWH) as the Australian Army would not enlist female doctors, only female nurses. In September 1915, they sailed to London to volunteer with the SWH. They were posted to Serbia in different units, Charles was in a unit at Valjevo headed by British doctor, Alice Hutchinson, and 100 km to the east, Hope was posted to a unit at Mladanovatz. Her unit was a 300-bed hospital commanded by the Scottish doctor, Beatrice McGregor. On her arrival on 10 October, she was met and welcomed by Elsie Inglis, the founder of SWH. Hope got straight to work assisting the doctors with a backlog of work, many wounded had gas gangrene in their wounds requiring operations. Charles' unit at Valjevo had to evacuate their 500-bed hospital unit, by train, almost immediately after he arrived, and Hope's unit was evacuated to Kragujevac soon after, on 12 October. On the first day in the new hospital, set up in artillery sheds, Hope observed the procedure for amputating limbs in surgery, and by the end of the week she had attended to 180 patients. After 13 days, they were ordered to evacuate again, moving to Kraljevo on 25 October. On the final day of October, Hope decided to join Charles and his unit, as they evacuated to Vrinjatcha Banja. Had she stayed with her unit, she would have had to decide whether to join the Great Serbian Retreat, evacuating patients across freezing Mule tracks through the snowy Albanian and Montenegrin mountains, or to join Inglis and other staff who stayed with the patients too unwell to be moved, becoming prisoners of war. Instead, with Charles's unit, the decision was made for her.

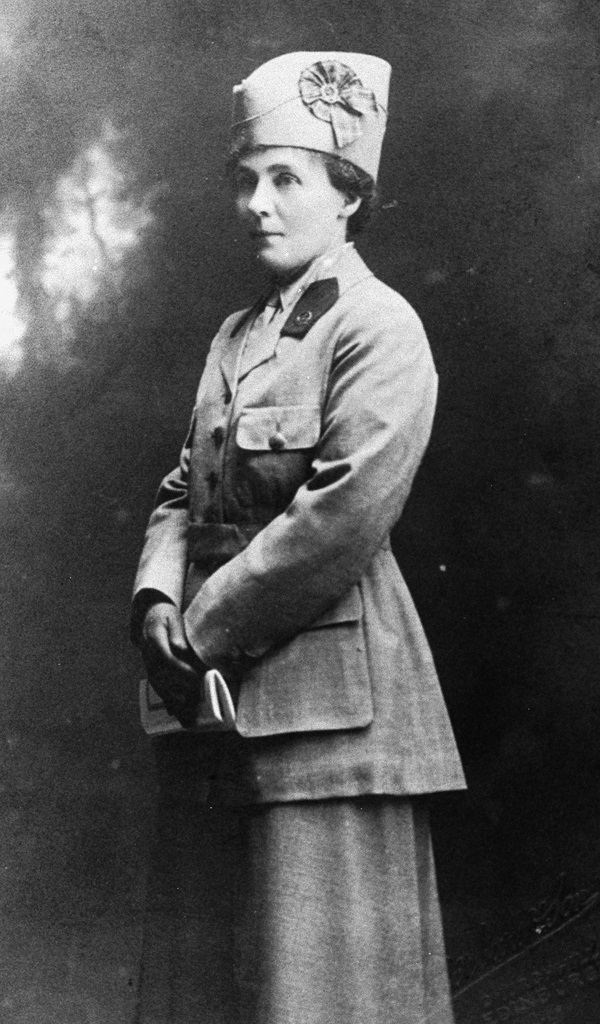
Dr. Laura Hope in Scottish Women's Hospital uniform, July 1915.

On 6 November, the Serbian orderlies at the new hospital they had set up at Vrinjatcha Banja fled. Four days later, during the night, Hope, Charles, and the other 32 medical staff awoke to find that the Austrian Army had quietly taken possession of the town during the night. They were now prisoners of war. The German captors made the prisoners work on their wounded soldiers for three weeks, then they were made to walk 11 km in the snow before boarding a train for Krushevatz with the intention that they would be put to work in an Austrian hospital. With the town having recently been bombed, they were accommodated in a filthy hotel. They were initially provided with an empty barracks and told to create a hospital, however, they were transported again just a few days later at 4 am on 4 December. They were loaded into a cattle truck for a bumpy thirty-six hour drive with no food, and little sleep, and when they arrived in Semendria they were jeered at by German soldiers while they waited to cross the Danube river to Hungary. They were then transported another 150 km to Kevevara, where they were housed in two unfurnished room with straw for beds. They spent Christmas and New Years here, with an insufficient ration of coffee, watery soup, and sour bread. They supplemented this by selling some of their belongings to buy food from the locals. The locals were kind to them, smuggling food when collecting firewood, or hiding eggs in their well buckets. Early in the new year the group were told their status had changed, they were no longer prisoners of war, they were 'interned', transferring them to the responsibility of the police who confined them into even smaller quarters at the police station. On 26 January 1916 they were put on a train, to travelled 340 km to Keceskemet where they stayed for a week, and then they boarded another train and eventually arrived at the Swiss boarder and freedom on 8 February 1916. The group waived a union jack flag out the window as they arrived, elated to be free. Following a period of respite in England, Hope was offered the role of heading another SWH unit as the Chief Medical Officer, which would be deployed to assist the Serbian Army. She declined as Charles had been unwell suffering from Bright's disease poor mental health. Instead, they returned to India and their mission efforts in 1916. Both were awarded the Serbian Samaritan Cross in 1918.

=== Post War ===
Prior to moving back to Adelaide with her husband for retirement, Hope received the Kaisar-i-Hind medal for her missionary work. Hope and Charles did mission work at the Australian Baptist Mission at Pubna, the New Zealand Baptist Misson Hospital, Chandpur, India, and the Bengal Baptist Mission at Kalimpong.

== Death ==
Hope died on 14 September 1952 in North Adelaide, South Australia and had no children. Her husband predeceased her in 1942.

== See also ==
- Other notable women volunteers in the Scottish Women's Hospitals for Foreign Service
- Women in World War I
- Australian women in World War I
- The Serbian campaign (1914–1915)
