= Statue of Elsie Inglis =

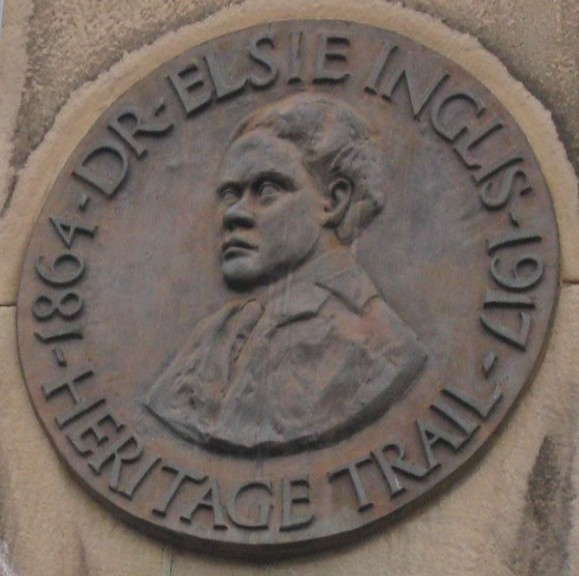
The statue will be installed opposite the existing plaque in Edinburgh's High Street

A statue of Elsie Inglis is due to be erected on the Royal Mile in Edinburgh. She established the Scottish Women's Hospitals for Foreign Service which created fourteen women's hospitals during the First World War. The first was at 219 High Street in Edinburgh which is where the statue will be installed.

== Background ==
The Lord Provost of Edinburgh launched a plan to make a permanent memorial to Inglis in the city in November 2021. There are more than 43 statues of men in Edinburgh city centre but only two statues of women, and on the Royal Mile itself (the site for Elsie's statue) there are twelve statues of men, and Elsie's will be the first statue of a woman. There was a campaign to raise the £47,500 funding for the memorial statue, virtual tours (through a QR code on the statue) and other ways to commemorate "a truly revered and treasured figure in Edinburgh's history".

As part of this campaign, an event was held by Girlguiding Scotland on 5 March 2022, in the Meadows in Edinburgh. This event was a sponsored 'sit still', with lots of activities sitting still, such as badge making, first aid and making a shelter from sticks. At this event, there was also a bespoke Elsie Inglis bus tour, provided by Edinburgh Bus Tours, that visited areas linked to Elsie Inglis around Edinburgh. This event was to raise funds for the memorial statue for Elsie, raise awareness and inspire the people of Girlguiding Scotland to do anything they put their mind to. Girlguiding Scotland also created an Elsie Inglis Challenge Pack. Girlguiding Scotland also created an accompanying badge for when members complete some activities from the Challenge Pack.

By May 2022, this crowd-funding drive by Thea Laurie and Fiona Garwood, raised £50,000, by engaging politicians and organisations and public figures like author, Sara Sheridan, tennis coach Judy Murray, scientist Linda Bauld and MSP Jenni Minto, as well as the Lord Provost. They said '"Dr Inglis is the perfect representative for women in Edinburgh. Her achievements in philanthropy and her efforts during World War One are just exceptional. She was a woman who would not be told to sit still and know her place." It will be built on the site of her first hospital at 219 High Street, Edinburgh. A competition for the design of the statue was launched, but on 17 October 2022 the charity's trustees announced that they had decided to cancel the contest and award the commission to Alexander Stoddart, the King's Sculptor in Ordinary. The announcement was met with criticism, and the trustees 'paused' the process to reflect on feedback and to consider their options. The public debate on this controversy has continued into 2025, with an open letter to the Edinburgh city council, with notable supporters from the arts and medicine.

The erection of the statue was approved by members of the City of Edinburgh Council's development management sub committee in a 7–2 vote in October 2025. The statue will be placed opposite the existing plaque and close to her first hospital. Some of Inglis's last words included "not me, my unit" in answer to praise of her work. The statue will honour the 1,500 women volunteers who served from Scotland, New Zealand, Australia and Canada.
