= Medna Luka =

Coordinates: 43°50′29″N 19°12′00″E

- Village
- Interactive map of Medna Luka
- Country: Bosnia and Herzegovina
- Region: Sarajevo-Romanija
- Municipality: Rogatica
- Time zone: UTC+1 (CET)
  - Summer (DST): UTC+2 (CEST)

Medna Luka is a village in the Republika Srpska, Bosnia and Herzegovina. According to the 1991 census, the village is located in the municipality of Rogatica.
