= Yvonne Fitzroy =

British actress and nurse (1891–1971)

Yvonne FitzRoy
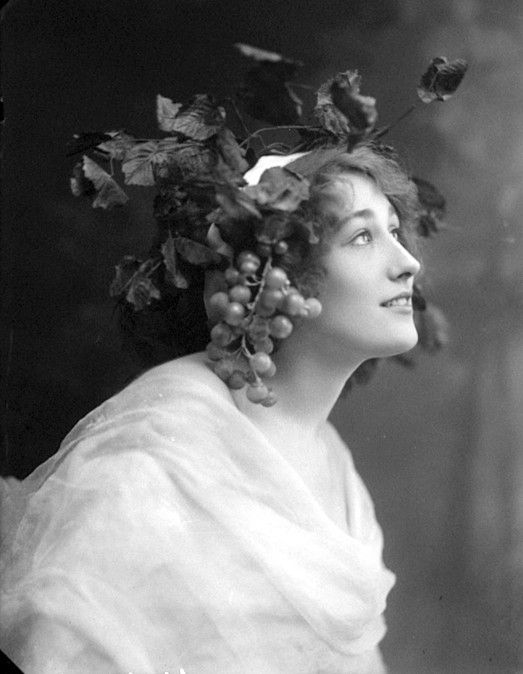
- Yvonne Fitzroy in 1910.
- Born: October 17, 1891
- Died: March 20, 1971 (aged 79)
- Occupations: Nurse and actress.

Yvonne Alice Gertrude FitzRoy (17 October 1891 – 20 March 1971) was a British nurse, actress and socialite who worked under Dr. Elsie Inglis as part of the Scottish Women's Hospitals for Foreign Service during WW1 and wrote a memoir about her time on the Russian Front.

Portrait of Yvonne Fitzroy in front of a hut during her time with the Scottish nurses in Romania taken in 1918.(image courtesy of Wellcome Collections)

== Biography ==
Yvonne Fitzroy was born on 17 October 1891 to Sir Almeric FitzRoy (grandson of Admiral Lord William Fitzroy) and Katherine Farquhar.

She worked as an orderly as part of the London unit of the Scottish Women's Hospital in Romania and Russia between 1916 and 1917 for which work, treating the Russian sick and wounded, she was awarded the Order of St. George and Order of St. Stanislas of Russia. She was one of seventy-five women who sailed from Liverpool, England to Archangel, Russia on 30 August 1916. Her service throughout the war was also recognised by the British Red Cross and Order of St John of Jerusalem in England.

In 1918, she published a memoir of her time on the Russian Front, With the Scottish nurses in Roumania (London: J. Murray, 1918).

She died at her home, aged 79, in Hartley Wintney, Hampshire on 20 March 1971.
