= Alice Hutchison =

Doctor who served in first world war

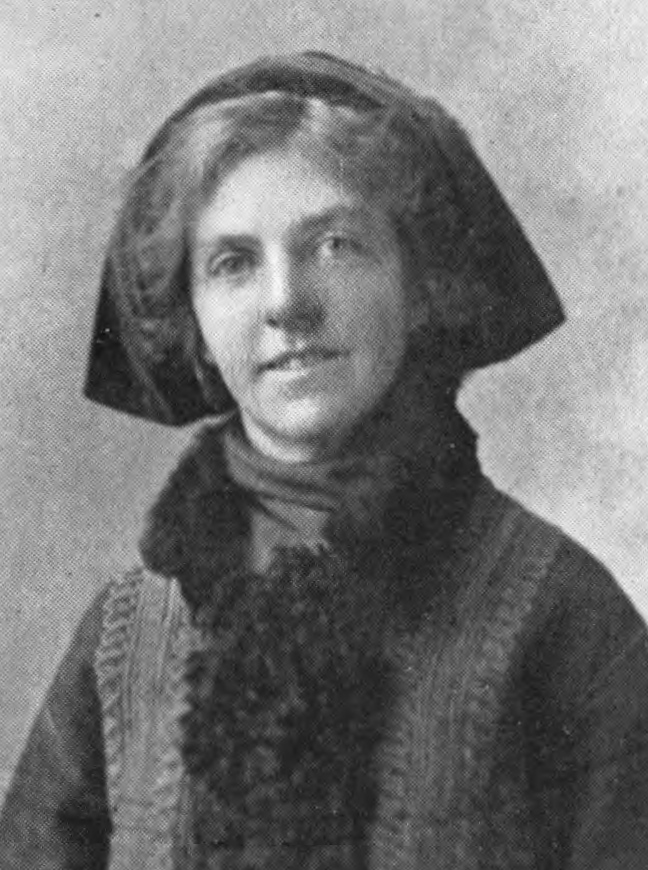
- Born: August 12, 1874; Dalhousie, India
- Died: 1953
- Other names: Hutchinson (different spelling)
- Occupation: Doctor
- Awards: Order of Saint Sava third class

Alice Hutchison (12 August 1874 – 1953) was a British medical doctor who served in the Balkan and First World Wars. She was one of the first women to lead a war-time hospital unit and was awarded the Serbian Order of Saint Sava.

== Early life and education ==
Alice Marion Hutchison was born 12 August 1874 in Dalhousie, India. Her father, John Hutchison, was a missionary working in India for the Church of Scotland; her mother was Margaret Andrew. She was educated at Beechwood in Moffat, and in Bridge of Allan.

== Career ==
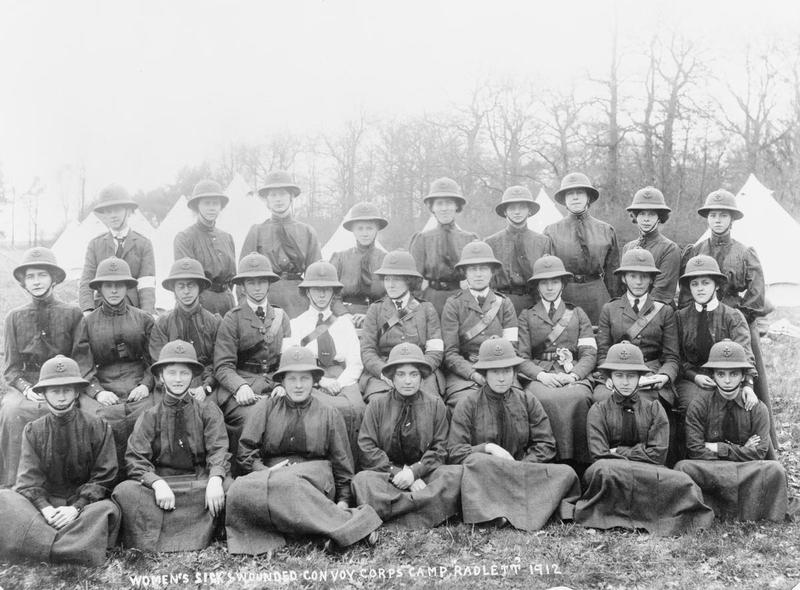
Group of the Women's Sick and Wounded Convoy Corps in Camp at Radlett in 1912.

Hutchinson became a doctor after graduating from the University of Edinburgh in 1903, and earned a Doctor of Medicine degree two years later. Afterwards, she was the doctor in charge of the John Street Dispensary in Edinburgh, a hospital that provided free medical care. She was in India, serving during a cholera epidemic that hit the country.

Hutchison was one of the three women doctors who travelled to Bulgaria as part of the Women's Sick and Wounded Convoy Corps. The Corps, which was set-up by Mabel St Clair Stobart, was almost all women, with the exception of three men. The unit spent five weeks in the country treating the wounded and sick as a result of the war. They left after the armistice was signed.

=== World War I ===
She volunteered at the outbreak of World War I for the Scottish Women's Hospitals for Foreign Service (SWH). She was the first doctor from the SWH sent to France and was initially placed in Boulogne, France. While looking for a building to house a hospital, a typhoid epidemic broke out amongst Belgian refugees in Calais. She, along with another doctor and ten nurses, treated the patients. She was noted for having the lowest rate of deaths due to typhoid in her hospital.

In May 1915, Hutchison and her unit, named the London-Wales Unit, were sent to Serbia. On their way there, they stopped in British controlled Malta. They were detained by the British military and ordered to treat the wounded there. This was the only time in the war where SWH officially treated British wounded.

After two weeks in Malta, they arrived in Serbia to set up 40-tent hospital in Valjevo. In October, an invasion of German and Austro-Hungarian forces entered Serbia, pushing back the army. After Bulgaria invaded, the Serbian military decided to retreat through Albania. Hutchinson decided to not follow the Serbian army, and stayed with her patients. She was captured by Austro-Hungarian forces on 15 November 1915. She, along with members of her unit, spent three months interned in Hungary, where she met Caroline Matthews who had been captured in Serbia after similarly staying with patients in Uzsitsi and was being tried for 'espionage', she called out 'How are you, Twiggie!' (Matthews' maiden name was Twigge). She successfully argued for all their release, citing the Geneva Convention. In February 1916, they were sent across the border to Switzerland, arriving back in England on 12 February. Following her return from Serbia, she was awarded the Order of St. Sava (third grade) for running one of the units which cared for the wounded Serbian soldiers. The Scotsman newspaper published an extensive interview with Hutchison in February 1916, during which she described her experiences, including her captivity by the Austrians, when part of the captives' journey was in railway horse-boxes. During their two months under guard, they devised tableaux vivants, dressing for example as the Kaiser and Emperor Franz Josef.

== Later life ==
Hutchison moved to London, England after the end of World War I, where she worked in several hospitals. She died at the age of 79 in 1953.
