= Patrick Fraser =

Patrick Fraser may refer to:

- Patrick Fraser, Lord Fraser (1817–1889), Scottish judge and legal scholar
- Patrick Allan Fraser (1812–1890), Scottish painter and architect
- Patrick Neill Fraser (1830–1905), Scottish printer and botanist
- Patrick Fraser (cricketer), Scottish cricketer, sports agent and stockbroker

== See also ==
- Fraser Patrick (born 1985), Scottish snooker player
