= Bucculatrix pomifoliella =

Scientific classification
- Kingdom: Animalia
- Phylum: Arthropoda
- Clade: Pancrustacea
- Class: Insecta
- Order: Lepidoptera
- Family: Bucculatricidae
- Genus: Bucculatrix
- Species: B. pomifoliella

Binomial name
- Bucculatrix pomifoliella Clemens, 1860

Synonyms
- Lithocolletis curvilineatella Packard, 1869; Bucculatrix curvilineatella; Bucculatrix pomonella Packard, 1880

Species of moth

Bucculatrix pomifoliella is a moth in the family Bucculatricidae. It was described by James Brackenridge Clemens in 1860 and is found in North America, where it has been recorded from Pennsylvania, Virginia, New Jersey, New York, Massachusetts, Maine, Ontario, Ohio, Tennessee, North Carolina, Missouri, Utah, Washington, British Columbia, Indiana, Manitoba, Quebec and West Virginia.

The wingspan is 7–7.5 mm. Adults have been recorded on wing from April to September. There are up to two generations per year.

The larvae feed on trees and shrubs in the family Rosaceae, including Prunus serotina, Amelanchier laevis and Physocarpus malvaceus. The larvae also feed on Malus species. They mine the leaves of their host plant.
