= B. palustris =

B. palustris may refer to:

- Brackenridgea palustris, a species of plant in the family Ochnaceae
- Boeckella palustris, a species of copepod that lives in South America
