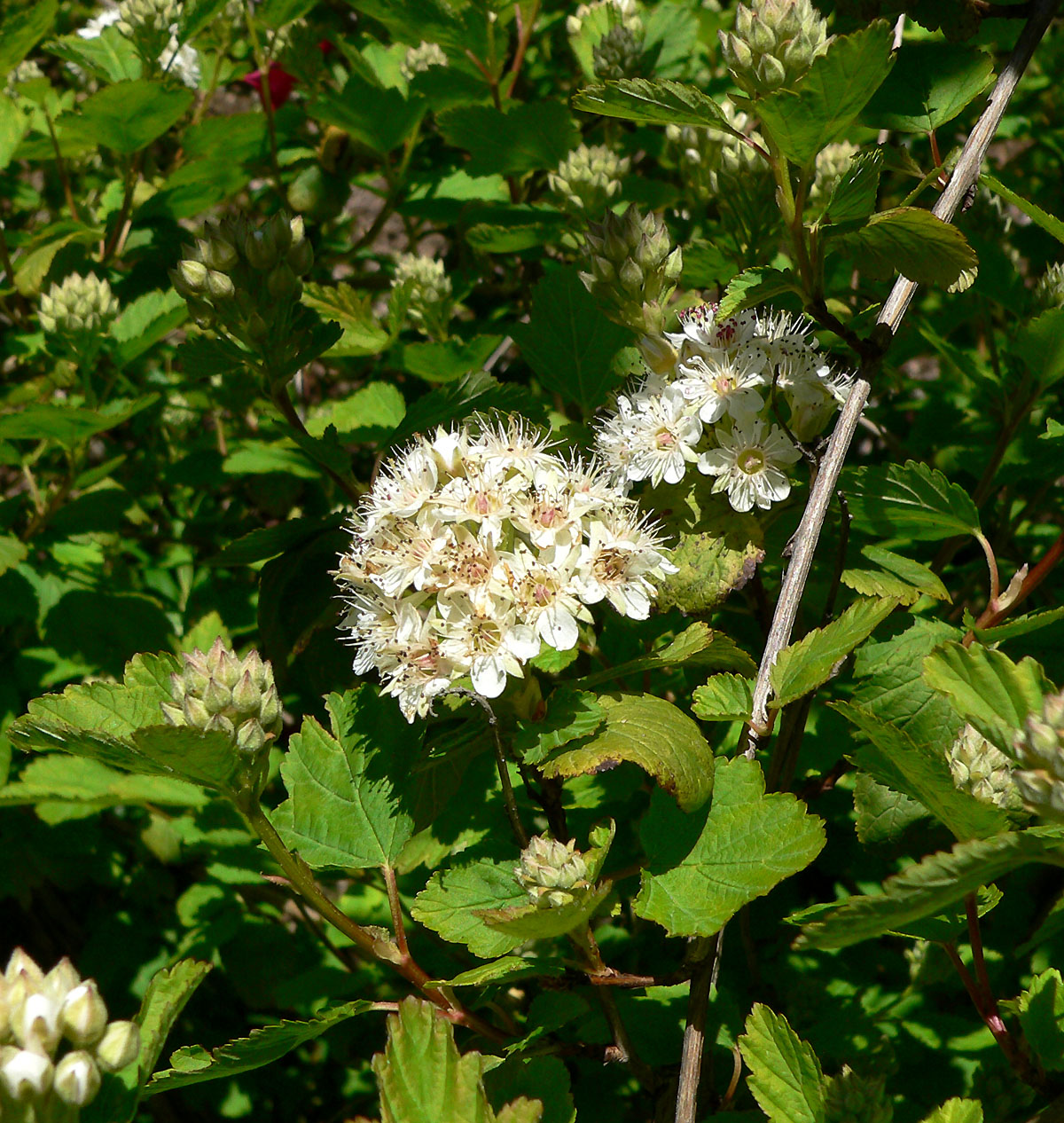
- Physocarpus monogynus

Scientific classification
- Kingdom: Plantae
- Clade: Embryophytes
- Clade: Tracheophytes
- Clade: Spermatophytes
- Clade: Angiosperms
- Clade: Eudicots
- Clade: Rosids
- Order: Rosales
- Family: Rosaceae
- Subfamily: Amygdaloideae
- Tribe: Neillieae; Maxim.

Genera
- Neillia; Physocarpus

= Neillieae =

Tribe of flowering plants

Neillieae is a tribe of flowering plants in rose family and the Amygdaloideae subfamily. It includes the genera Physocarpus and Neillia.
