= William Brackenridge =

Scottish-American botanist (1810–1893)

William Dunlop Brackenridge
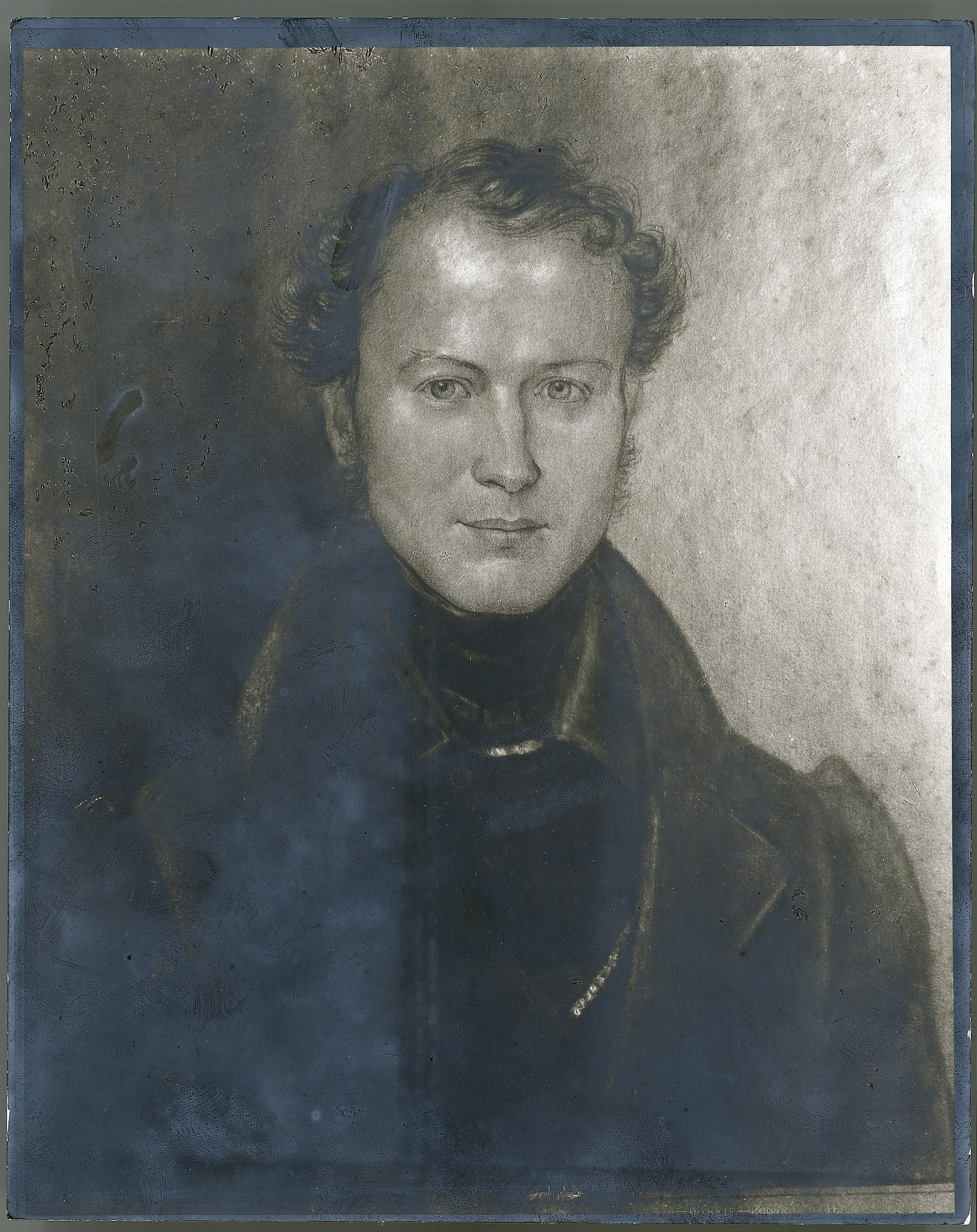
- Born: 1810; Ayr, Scotland
- Died: 1893 (aged 82–83); Baltimore, United States
- Known for: Darlingtonia californica
- Scientific career
- Fields: botany
- Workplaces: Gardener to Patrick Neill, Secretary of the Caledonian Horticultural Society, Edinburgh; Student under Christoph Friedrich Otto, Director of the Botanical Garden in Berlin; United States Exploring Expedition
- Author abbrev. (botany): Brackenr. or Brack.

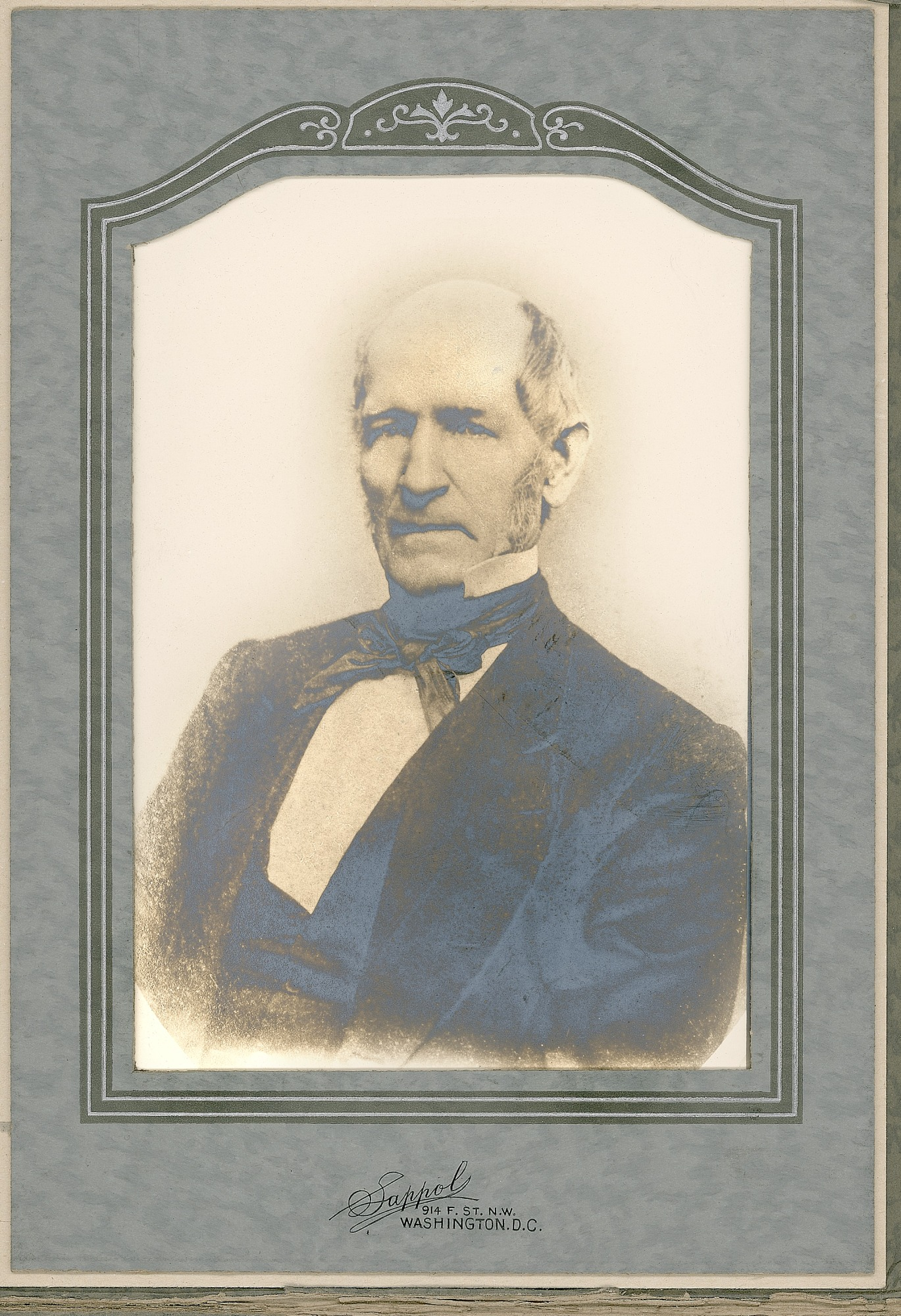
Brackenridge in 1880

William Dunlop Brackenridge (1810–1893) was a British-American nurseryman and botanist.

Brackenridge emigrated to Philadelphia in 1837, where he was employed by Robert Buist, nurseryman. He was appointed horticulturalist, then assistant botanist, for the United States Exploring Expedition from 1838 to 1842. Originally, the well-known botanist Asa Gray was to be the chief botanist, and William Rich, a Washington, DC socialite and son of an ambassador, was politically appointed as his assistant. However, Gray never went on the expedition due to taking an academic job, and Rich was appointed botanist, so they needed a new assistant. Rich was reportedly of little use on the trip, and Brackenridge did almost all the collecting and serious botany work.

Brackenridge was assigned to the U.S. Ship Vincennes. In 1839, he collected plants in the Sydney and Hunter River districts of New South Wales, Australia. From 1841 to 1842, the ships explored the Oregon and California coasts, with trips inland. After returning, he continued working with the collected plants and wrote the fern report for the expedition, included in the overall botanical report written by Asa Gray. After 1855, he lived in Baltimore and worked as a nurseryman and landscape architect. Near Mount Shasta, he discovered the California Pitcher Plant, Darlingtonia californica, one of the noted successes of the expedition. John Torrey chose the genus name to honor his friend, Pennsylvania botanist William Darlington.

Brackenridge Passage in Puget Sound is named for him.

Reports of the day indicate that Brackenridge was a hardy, strapping six-footer. He and his wife Isobel were Presbyterians. They had at least four children: Agnes (1846), Robert Buist (1847), William D. (1850), and Jane Henderson Brackenridge (1854).

== Plants named for W. D. Brackenridge ==
- The plant genus Brackenridgea A. Gray, in the Ochnaceae (Fiji and Australia)
- The tree fern Cyathea brackenridgei Mett. (Cyatheaceae)
- The Hibiscus species Hibiscus brackenridgei A. Gray (Malvaceae)

== Plants named by W. D. Brackenridge ==
(list not inclusive)

- Diclidopteris Brack. (genus)
- Diellia Brack. (genus; now included in Asplenium L.)
- Onychium densum Brack.: now Aspidotis densa (Brack.) Lellinger
- Antrophyum subfalcatum Brack.
- Cyrtogonium palustre Brack.: now Bolbitis palustris (Brack.) Hennipman
- Sitolobium samoense Brack.: now Dennstaedtia samoensis ( Brack.) T.Moore
- Gymnogramma pilosa Brack.: now Coniogramme pilosa (Brack.) Hieron.
- Blechnum coriaceum (Brack.) Brownlie
- Blechnum vittatum Brack.
- Polypodium sarmentosum Brack.: now Adenophorus sarmentosus ( Brack. ) K.Wilson
- Goniopteris costata Brack.: now Pneumatopteris costata (Brack.) Holtt.
- Lastrea attenuata Brack.: now Plesioneuron attenuatum (Brack.) Holtt.
- Goniopteris glandulifera Brack.: now Pneumatopteris glandulifera (Brack.) Holtt.
- Elaphoglossum intermedium Brack.
- Oleandra hirta Brack.

== Works by W. D. Brackenridge ==
- Brackenridge, William Dunlop. United States Exploring Edition Report, Volume XVI - Botany - Filices. 1854.
- Brackenridge, William Dunlop. United States Exploring Edition Report, Volume XVI - Botany - Filices: Atlas. 1856.

== See also ==
- European and American voyages of scientific exploration
