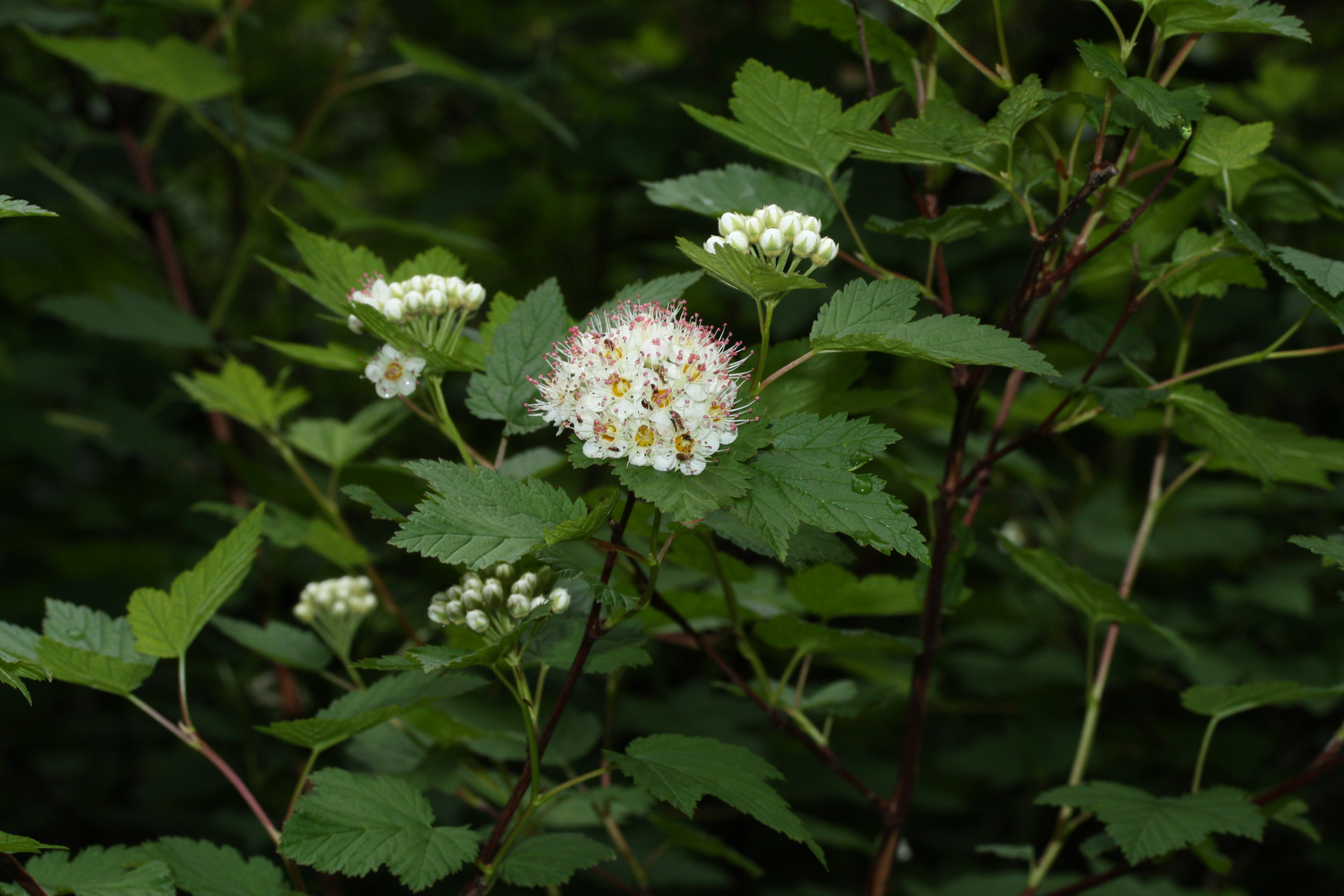
- Washington specimen

Scientific classification
- Kingdom: Plantae
- Clade: Tracheophytes
- Clade: Angiosperms
- Clade: Eudicots
- Clade: Rosids
- Order: Rosales
- Family: Rosaceae
- Genus: Physocarpus
- Species: P. capitatus

Binomial name
- Physocarpus capitatus (Pursh) Kuntze

Synonyms
- Physocarpus opulfolius; Physocarpus tomentullus; Spiraea capitatus

= Physocarpus capitatus =

Species of flowering plant

Physocarpus capitatus, commonly called Pacific ninebark or tall ninebark, is a species of Physocarpus in the rose family native to western North America.

== Description ==
Physocarpus capitatus is a dense deciduous shrub growing to 1–2.5 metres (3 1/2–8 feet) tall. The reddish-gray bark, which is flaky and peels away in many irregular thin layers.

The leaves are distinctively grape or maple-like, palmately lobed, and 3–14 centimetres (1–5 1/2 inches) long and broad. They are deeply veined with double-toothed margins, and are a dark, shiny green on top.

It has clusters of small, creamy white flowers with five petals and numerous red-tipped stamens, which appear in late spring and persist into midsummer.

The unique fruit is an inflated glossy red pod about 6 millimetres (1/4 in) long which turns dry and brown and then splits open to release seeds.

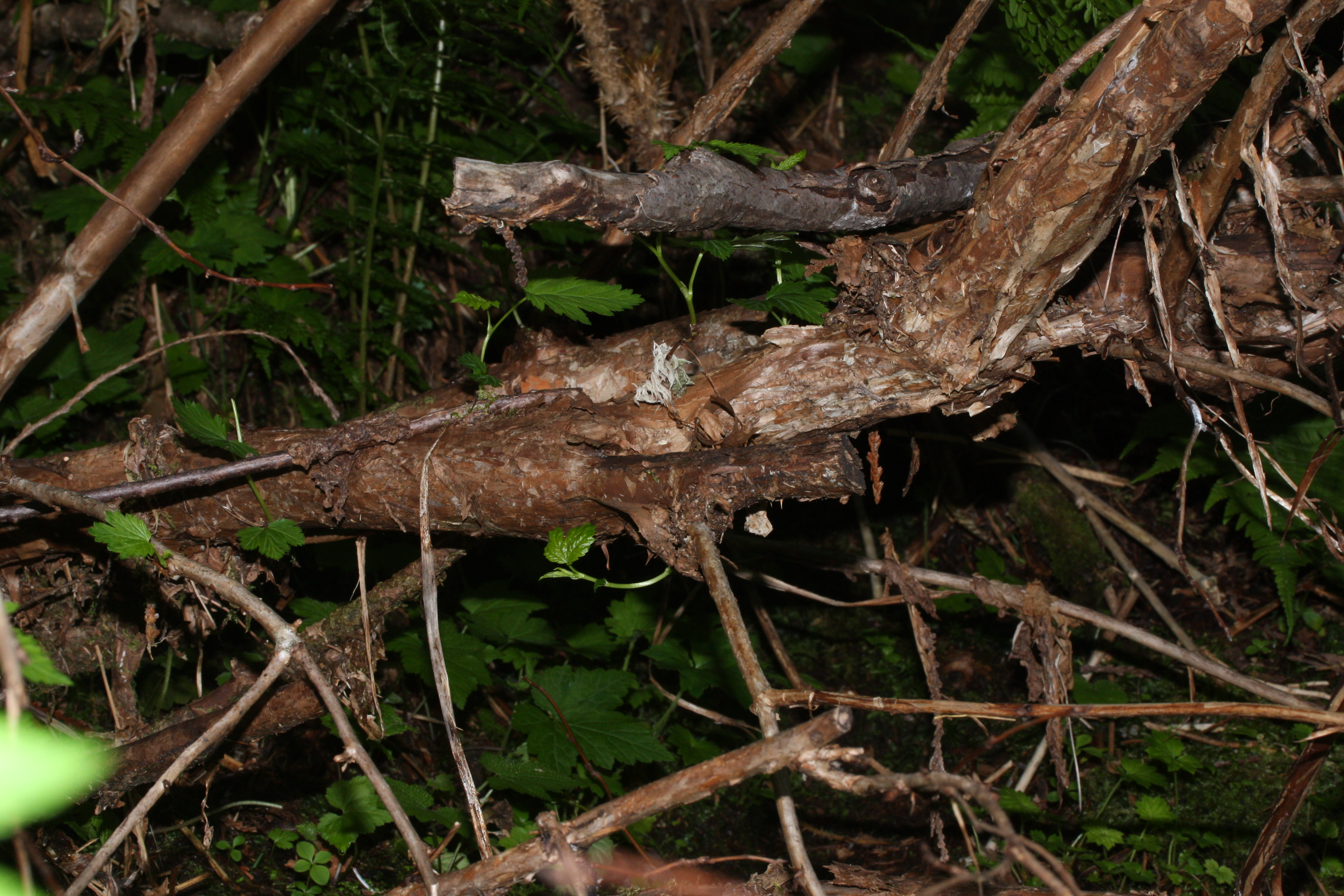
The flaky bark

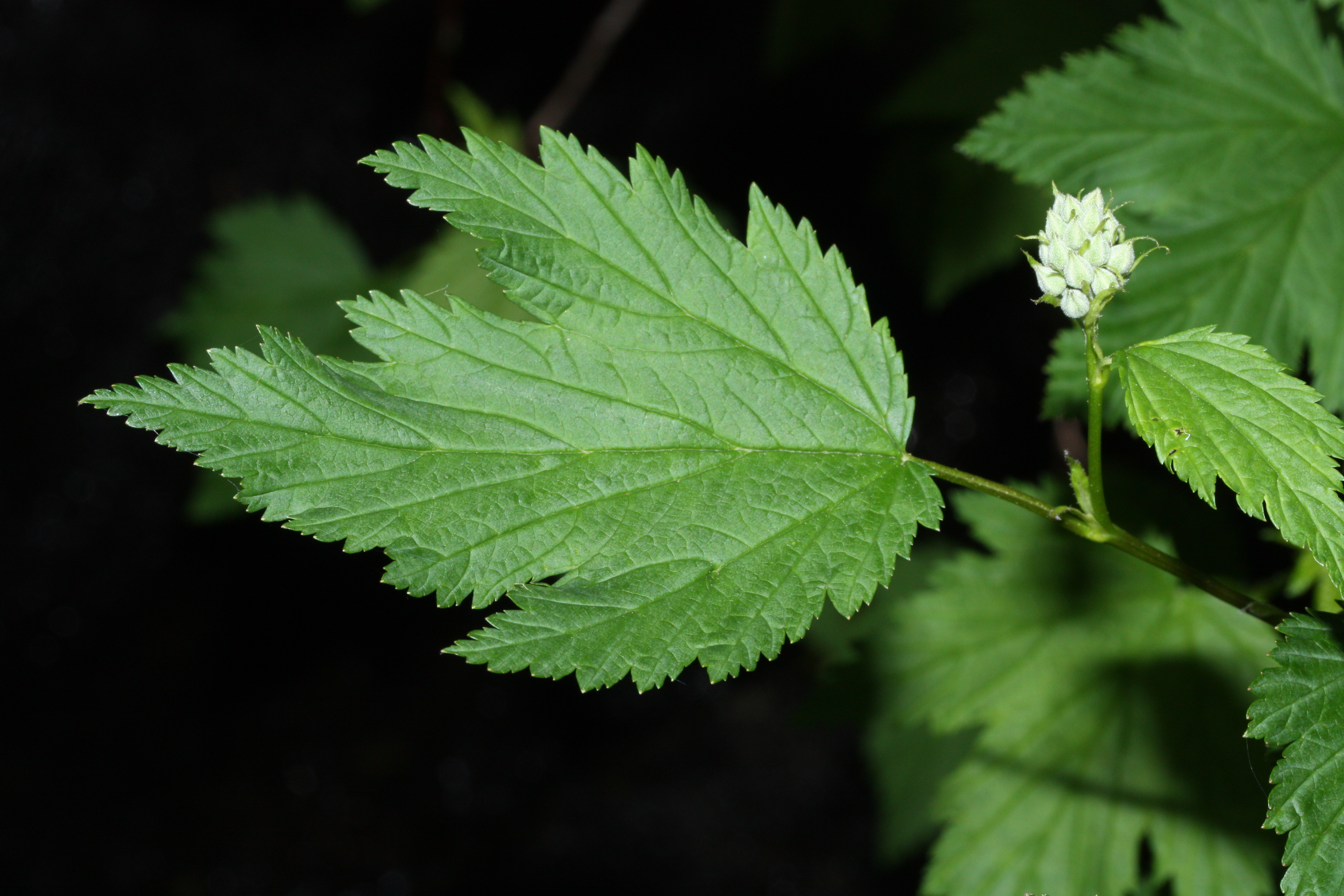
Leaf and bud

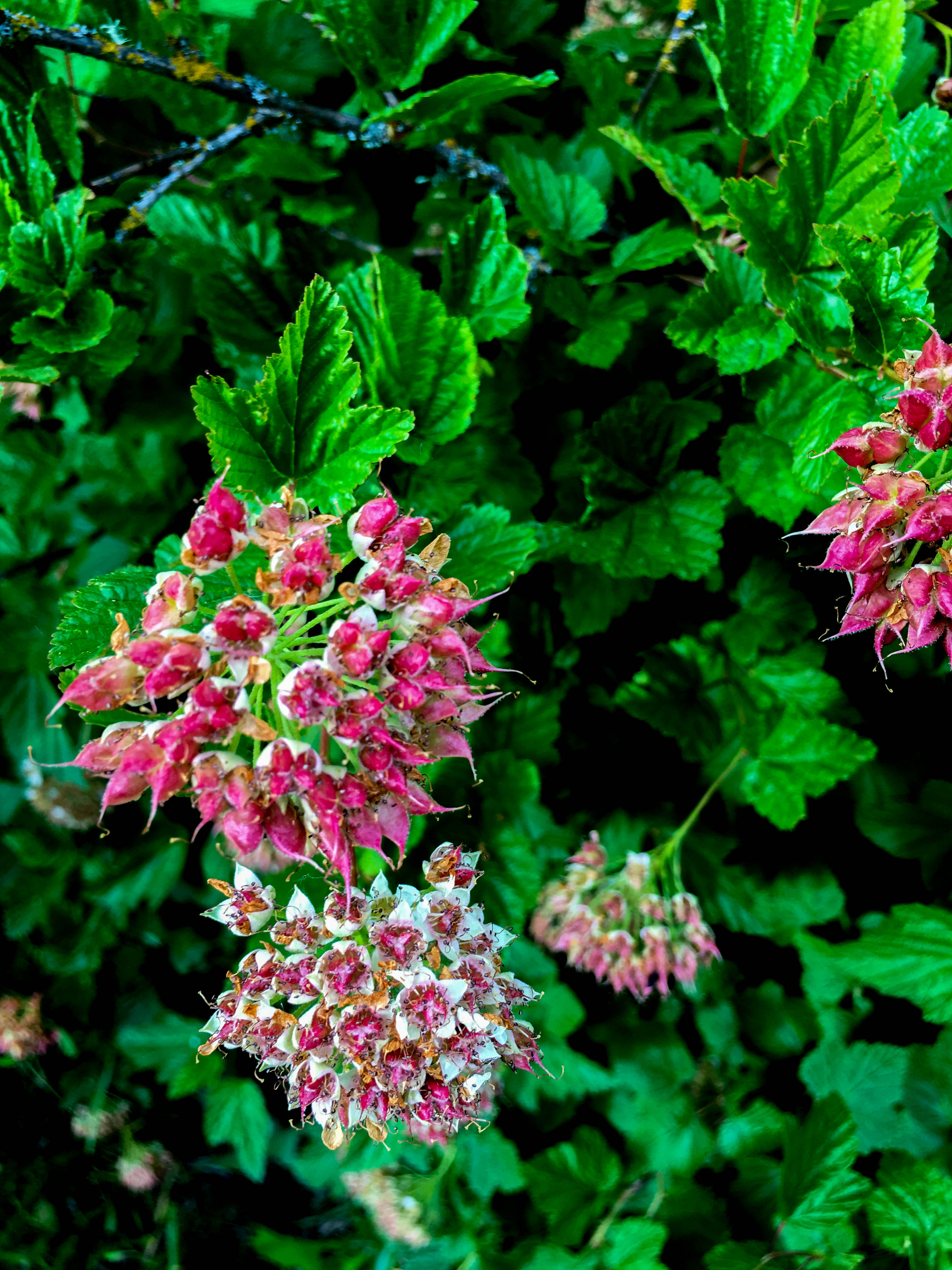
Flowers and leaves

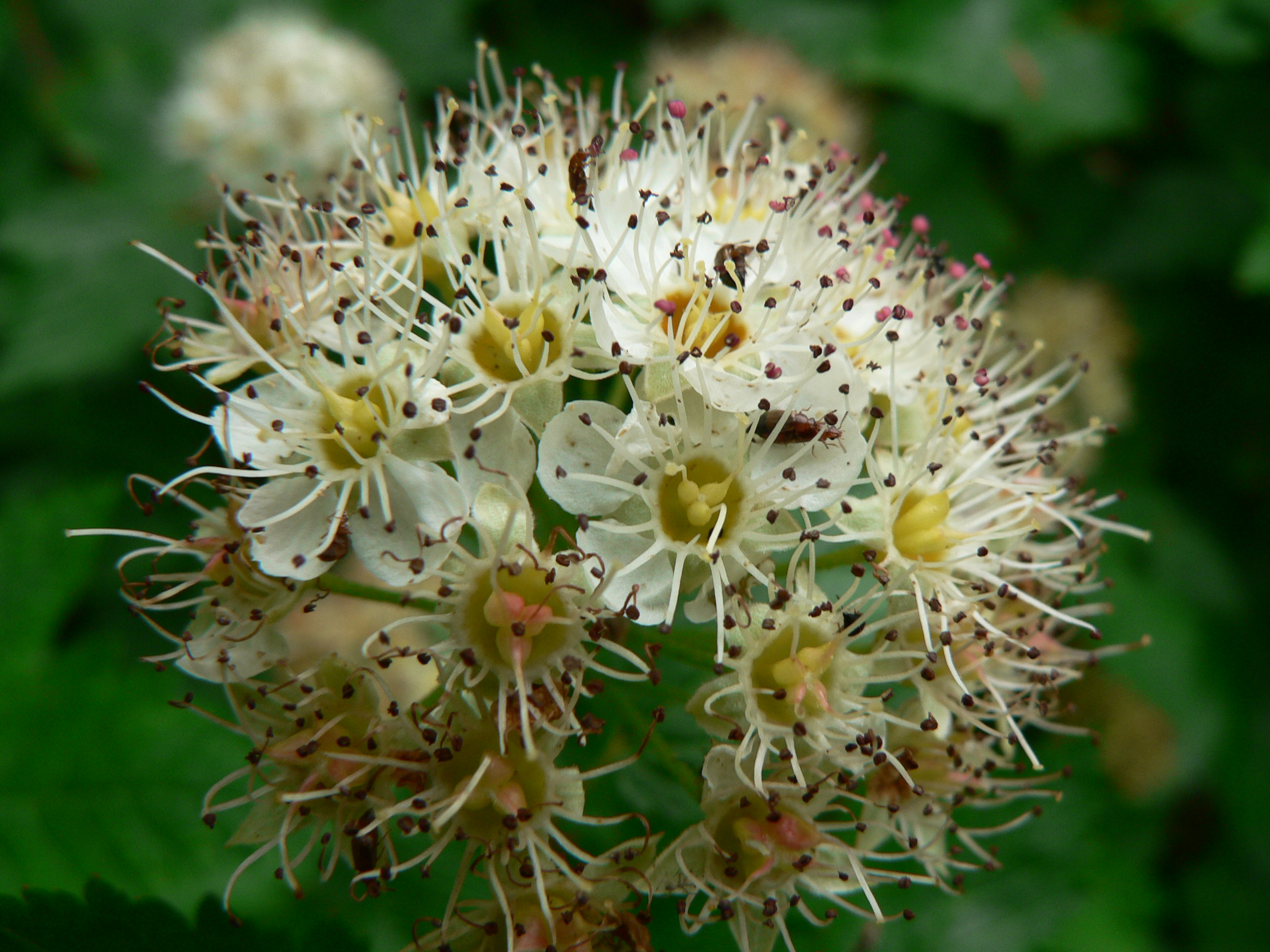
Close-up of flowers

== Etymology ==
The common name 'ninebark' comes from the appearance of the flaky bark, seeming to have many layers.

== Distribution and habitat ==
It is found at low and middle elevations in southern Alaska east to Montana and Utah, and south to southern California. It is most common west of the Cascades and Sierra Nevada, often abundant on the north slopes of coastal mountains. It is less prevalent in the east of its range, where it overlaps with that of the mallow ninebark.

It is often found in wetlands, but also forms thickets along rivers and in moist forest habitats. While it grows most robustly in wet environments, it is drought-tolerant to a degree. It prefers partial shade, but tolerates full sun and is adapted to many different soil types.

== Ecology ==
Although it has low palatability for browsing ungulates, Pacific ninebark provides good cover and nesting sites for birds and small mammals. The seeds are eaten by birds, and persist in the seed heads until winter.

== Toxicity ==
Some consider the plant toxic.

== Uses ==
Pacific ninebark was used as an emetic and a laxative by indigenous groups. The stems were used to make children's hunting bows and small items such as needles; straighter shoots were used to make arrows. The bark was mixed with cedar bark to make a dark brown dye.

It is used in ecological restoration due to its fibrous roots which are good for bank stabilization, and its ability to grow from cuttings. Furthermore, it does not need an overhead canopy to become established at a restoration site as it is tolerant of direct sun. It may grow aggressively enough to shade out invasive species such as reed canary grass and Himalayan blackberry. It is popular in California as a garden plant.
