= Louisa Jordan =

Scottish nurse (1878–1915)

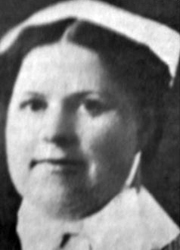
- Born: 24 July 1878; Glasgow, Scotland
- Died: 6 March 1915 (aged 36); Kragujevac, Serbia
- Cause of death: Typhus
- Resting place: Niš Commonwealth Military Cemetery
- Occupation: Nurse
- Known for: Nurse during WWI and 1915 Serbian Typhus epidemic

Louisa Jordan (24 July 1878 – 6 March 1915) was a Scottish nurse who died in service during the First World War.

== Early life and nursing career ==
Louisa Jordan was born at 279 Gairbraid Street (now Maryhill Road) in the Maryhill area of Glasgow, Scotland, in July 1878. Her parents, both from Ireland, were Henry Jordan, a white lead and paint mixer, and Helen (or Ellen) Jordan, and among her 10 siblings (of whom 3 died in infancy) were Helen (or Ellen), David, Elizabeth and Thomas. The family lived at 30 Kelvinside Avenue.

In 1901, she was employed as a mantle maker. She began her nursing career in Quarrier's Homes, a Bridge of Weir sanatorium, before moving to Shotts Fever Hospital. She spent 5 years at the 1st Poor Law Crumpsall Hospital in Manchester, where she became sister in charge of one of the wards and gained wide general nursing experience, before moving back to Scotland, first to Edinburgh and then working at Strathaven, as a Queen Victoria Jubilee nurse. From Strathaven she was transferred to Buckhaven, Fife, where she was a district nurse.

== First World War service ==
Working as a nurse in Buckhaven at the start of the First World War, Jordan enlisted with the Scottish Women's Hospitals for Foreign Service in December 1914.

She joined the 1st Serbian unit under the command of Eleanor Soltau. They departed from Southampton in mid-December. On arrival at Salonica, Greece, the unit was deployed to Kragujevac. She initially treated war-wounded soldiers at the Scottish Women's Hospital.

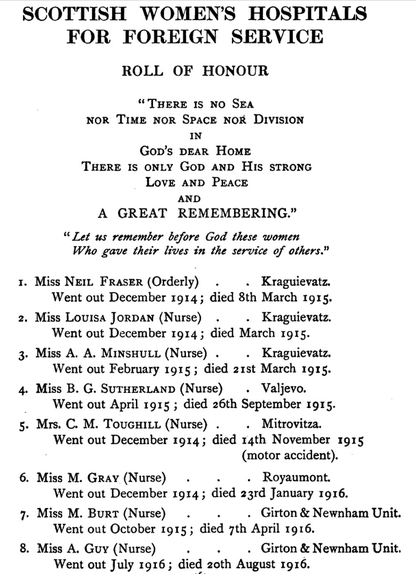
Scottish Women's Hospitals roll of honour

During the Serbian epidemic of typhus in early 1915, she was placed in charge of the new typhus ward. Jordan had volunteered to treat Elizabeth Ross, who was dying of typhus, and Jordan herself died of the disease in March 1915. An Edinburgh orderly nurse, Margaret Neill Fraser, is also reported to have died from typhus when treating the sick in Serbia at the same time.

Jordan was buried at the Niš Commonwealth Military Cemetery, where she is remembered annually in Serbia along with other nurses who served during the 1915 typhus and relapsing fever epidemic. Her grave (D. 5), with no religious emblem, is inscribed "GREATER LOVE HATH NO MAN". In Scotland she is commemorated at the Buckhaven War Memorial and at Kelvinbridge Parish Church in Glasgow. Her name is also included in a memorial panel at York Minster.

== NHS Louisa Jordan ==
In 2020, it was announced by NHS Scotland that the NHS Louisa Jordan hospital in Glasgow, an emergency critical care hospital built to deal with the COVID-19 pandemic, was to be named after her.

The Scottish Health Secretary Jeane Freeman stated that "She is a person who has perhaps up until now been better remembered in Serbia than in Scotland. This hospital is a fitting tribute to her service and her courage."
