= Patrick Neill Fraser =

Scottish printer and botanist (1830–1905)

Patrick Neill Fraser FRSE FRSGS (1830–1905) was a Scottish printer and botanist. He was an expert on ferns.

== Life ==
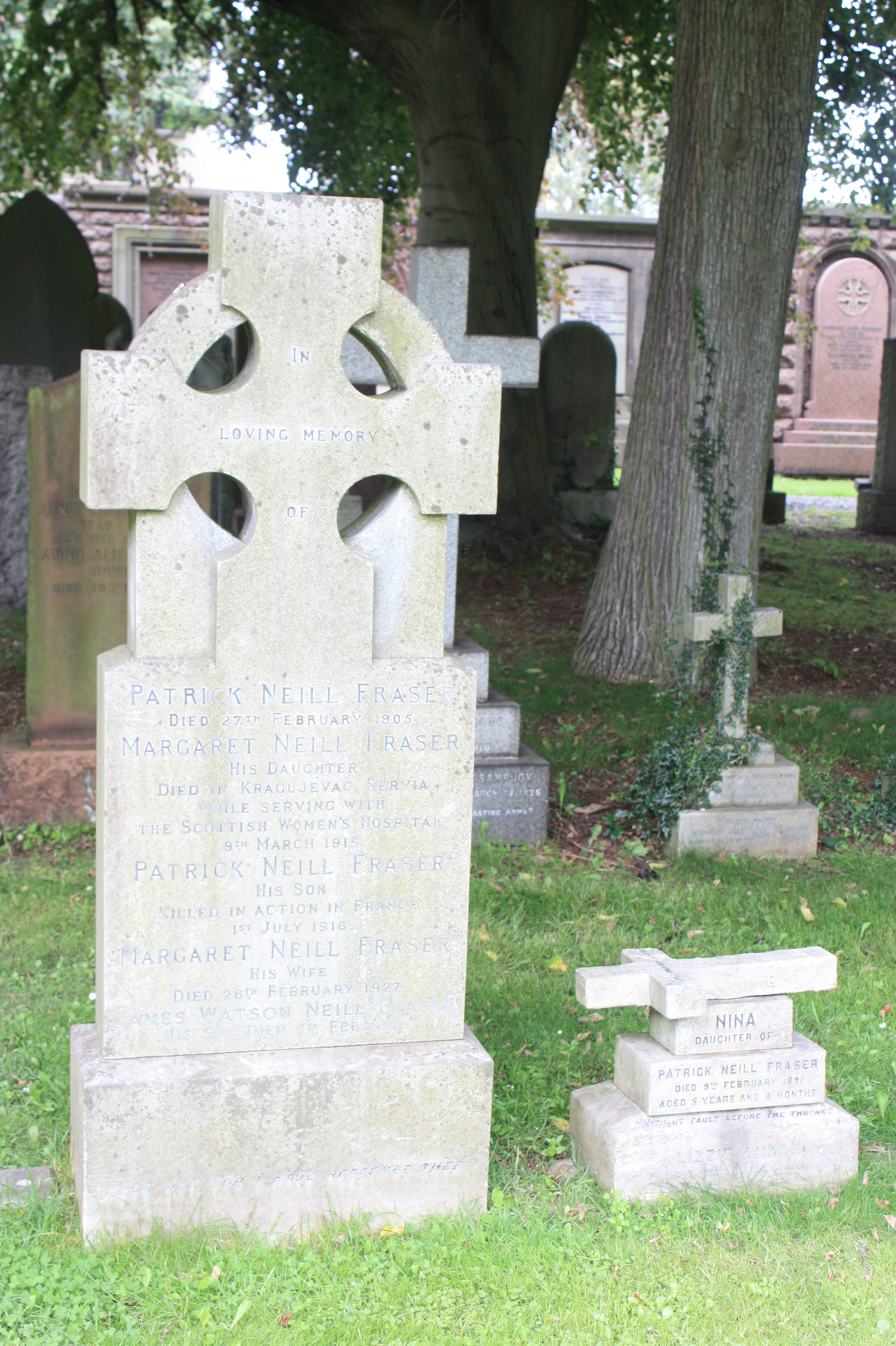
The grave of Patrick Neill Fraser, Dean Cemetery

He was born at 59 Lauriston Place in Edinburgh the son of William Fraser, a printer at Neill & Co. (est.1749) He was named after his father's boss Patrick Neill, who was probably also his godfather. The printworks, at 10 Old Fishmarket Close in the Old Town had been rebuilt in 1825 following total destruction in the Great Fire of Edinburgh.

When Neill died childless in 1851 Patrick Neill Fraser took over the printworks (aged only 21) with his younger brother Alexander Fraser. He was living at Canonmills Cottage in north Edinburgh, close to the Royal Botanic Garden in 1855.

He later moved to "Rockville" on Murrayfield Road. Here is garden was famed for its alpines, hardy ferns and polyanthus.

In 1892 he was elected a Fellow of the Royal Society of Edinburgh. His proposers were Andrew Douglas Maclagan, Sir Arthur Mitchell, Sir William Turner and Alexander Buchan.

He died at Rockville on 27 February 1905 and is buried in Dean Cemetery in western Edinburgh. The grave lies in the north-west section of the first northern extension.

== Family ==
He was father to Margaret Neill Fraser who became a golfer. His son, also Patrick Neill Fraser, was killed on 1 July 1916: the first day of the Battle of the Somme.
