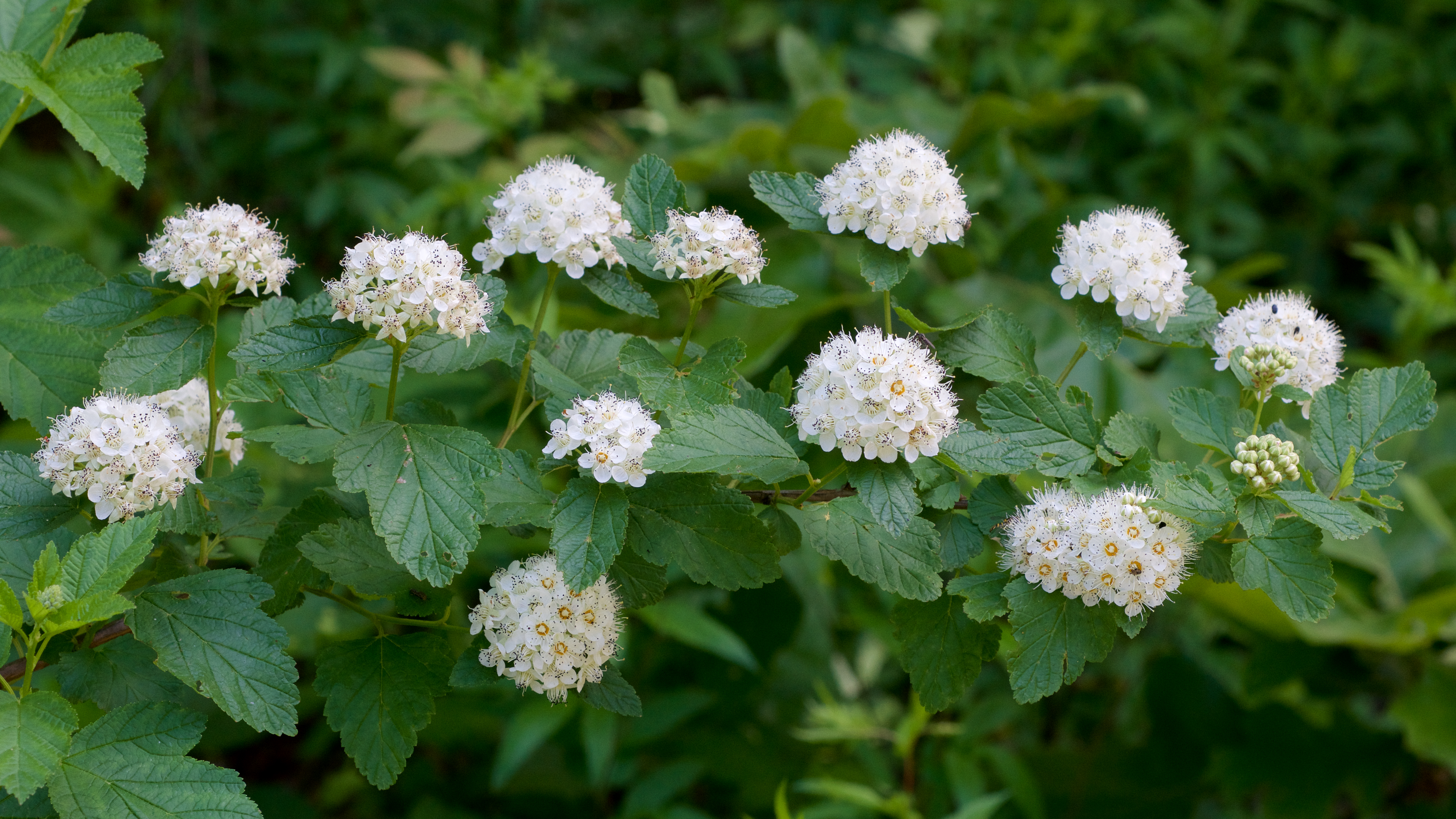
- Physocarpus opulifolius

Scientific classification
- Kingdom: Plantae
- Clade: Tracheophytes
- Clade: Angiosperms
- Clade: Eudicots
- Clade: Rosids
- Order: Rosales
- Family: Rosaceae
- Subfamily: Amygdaloideae
- Tribe: Neillieae
- Genus: Physocarpus (Cambess.) Raf. 1836

Species
- 6–20, see text

= Physocarpus =

Genus of flowering plants

Physocarpus, commonly called ninebark, is a genus of flowering plants in the family Rosaceae. All but two species are native to North America; the two outliers being native to northeastern Asia.

The genus name Physocarpus comes from the Greek for "bladder fruit", referring to the inflated fruits of some species. The common name 'ninebark' refers to the peeling bark of mature branches, which comes away in strips.

== Description ==
Physocarpus are deciduous shrubs with peeling bark and alternately arranged leaves. The leaves are palmate with 3 to 7 lobes and often toothed edges. The inflorescence is a cluster of bell-shaped flowers with 5 rounded white or pink petals and many stamens. The fruit is a flat or inflated dehiscent follicle.

Physocarpus opulifolius is cultivated as an ornamental plant. Several cultivars have been bred, particularly for foliage of varying colors, including 'Dart's Gold' and 'Luteus', which have yellowish leaves, and 'Monlo' and 'Seward', which have reddish purple foliage.

== Taxonomy ==
=== Species ===
There are six to 20 species in the genus. They include:

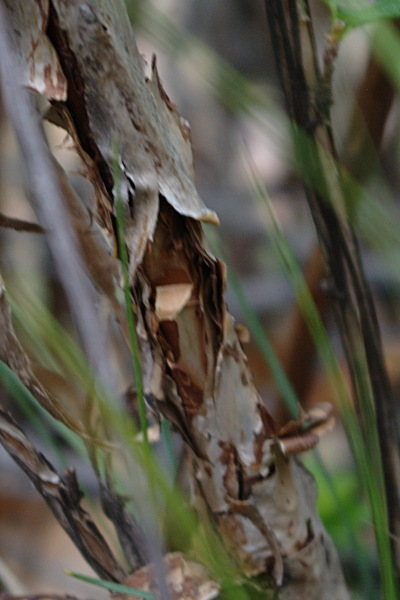
Bark of Physocarpus monogynus

- Physocarpus alternans (M.E.Jones) J.T.Howell (1931) – dwarf ninebark (western North America)
- Physocarpus amurensis (Maxim.) Maxim. (1879) – Asian ninebark (Asia)
- Physocarpus australis (Rydb.) Rehder (1920)
- Physocarpus bracteatus (Rydb.) Rehder (1916) – (Colorado)
- Physocarpus capitatus (Pursh) Kuntze (1891) – Pacific ninebark (western North America)
- Physocarpus glabratus (Rydb.) Rehder (1915) – (Colorado)
- Physocarpus malvaceus (Greene) Kuntze (1891) – mallow ninebark (western North America)
- Physocarpus monogynus (Torr.) J.M. Coult. (1891) – mountain ninebark (North America)
- Physocarpus opulifolius (L.) Maxim. (1879) – common ninebark (eastern North America)
- Physocarpus pauciflorus C.K.Schneid. (1906)
- Physocarpus ribesifolia Kom. (1973) – (Asia)

=== Synonyms ===
- Physocarpus hanceana Kuntze (1891) = Neillia hanceana (Kuntze) S.H.Oh (2006)
- Physocarpus intermedius (Rydb.) C.K.Schneid. (1906) = Physocarpus opulifolius var. intermedius (Rydb.) B.L.Rob. (1908)
- Physocarpus torreyi (S. Watson) Maxim. (1879) = Physocarpus monogynus (Torr.) J.M.Coult. (1891)
- Physocarpus stellatus (Rydb. ex Small) Rehder (1920) = Physocarpus opulifolius (L.) Maxim. (1879)

== Cultivation ==
Propagation is by seeds sown as soon as ripe or they can be stored dry in airtight containers in a cool place for up to a year and then sown. Plants can be divided in the early spring, with a sharp spade or even an axe, chopping right through the middle. Softwood and hardwood cuttings are easy to root.

Garden writers describe few if any problems, but it is not unheard for armies of aphids to attack some varieties. Some seaside specimens exhibit powdery mildew in summer.
