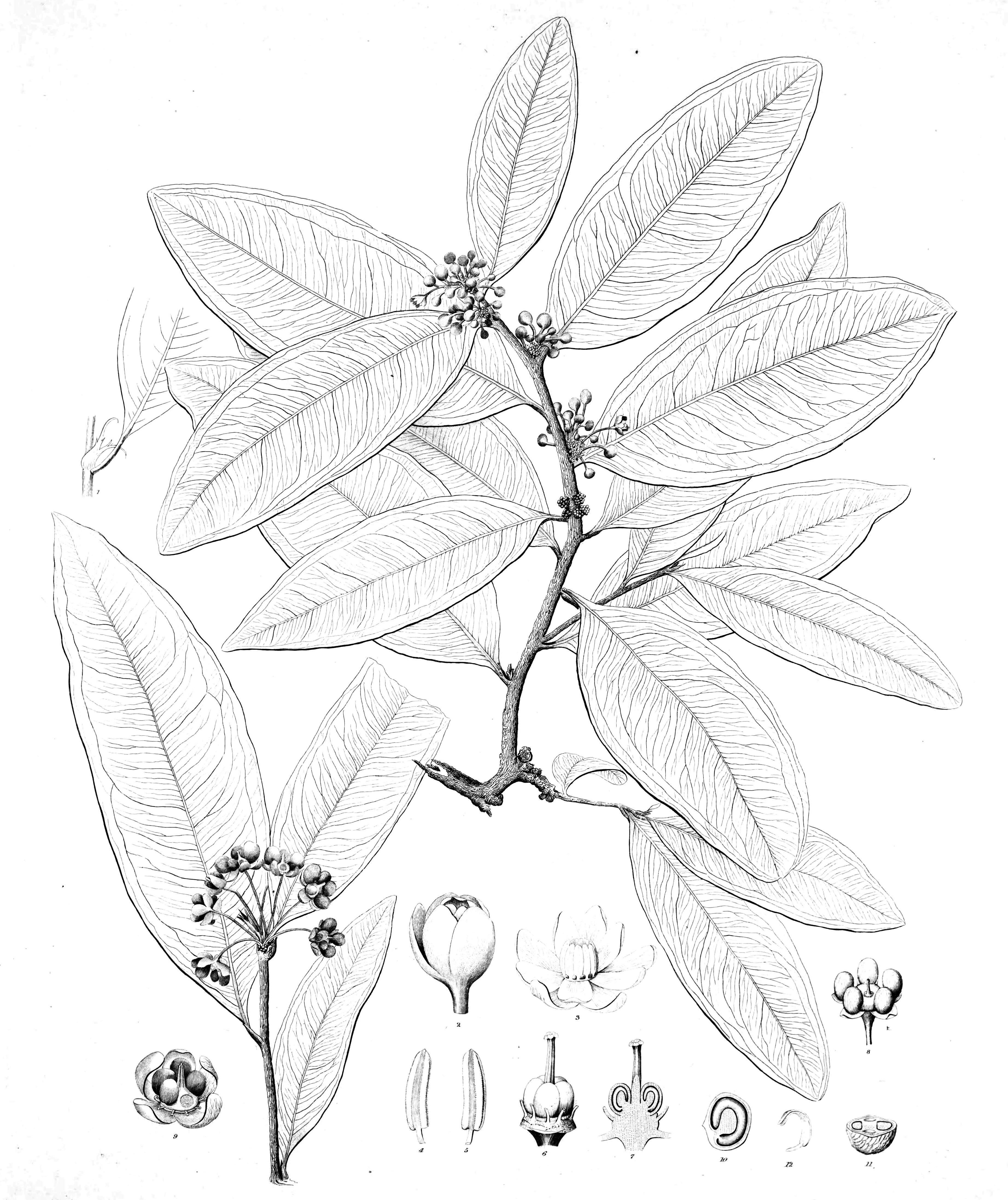
- Brackenridgea nitida

Scientific classification
- Kingdom: Plantae
- Clade: Tracheophytes
- Clade: Angiosperms
- Clade: Eudicots
- Clade: Rosids
- Order: Malpighiales
- Family: Ochnaceae
- Subfamily: Ochnoideae
- Tribe: Ochneae
- Subtribe: Ochninae
- Genus: Brackenridgea; A.Gray

Species
- 11 (see text)

Synonyms
- Campylopora Tiegh.; Notochnella Tiegh.; Pleuroridgea Tiegh.

= Brackenridgea =

Genus of flowering plants

Brackenridgea is a flowering plant genus of 11 species in the family Ochnaceae. The genus is named for the British-American botanist William Dunlop Brackenridge.

== Description ==
Brackenridgea species grow as small to medium-sized trees. The flowers are white or yellow. The fruits are drupes (pitted) and are greenish, ripening black.

== Distribution and habitat ==
Brackenridgea species grow naturally in tropical central and southern Africa, Madagascar, Myanmar, Thailand, Malesia, New Guinea, and Queensland.

== Species ==
As of May 2025, Plants of the World Online accepts the following 11 species:

- Brackenridgea arenaria (De Wild. & T.Durand) N.Robson
- Brackenridgea elegantissima (Wall.) Kanis
- Brackenridgea fascicularis (Blanco) Fern.-Vill.
- Brackenridgea forbesii Tiegh.
- Brackenridgea foxworthyi (Elmer) Furtado
- Brackenridgea madecassa (H.Perrier) Callm.
- Brackenridgea mindanaensis (Merr.) Fernando
- Brackenridgea nitida A.Gray
- Brackenridgea palustris Bartell.
- Brackenridgea tetramera (H.Perrier) Callm.
- Brackenridgea zanguebarica Oliv.
