= Brackenridgea elegantissima =

Conservation status
- Least Concern (IUCN 3.1)

Scientific classification
- Kingdom: Plantae
- Clade: Tracheophytes
- Clade: Angiosperms
- Clade: Eudicots
- Clade: Rosids
- Order: Malpighiales
- Family: Ochnaceae
- Genus: Brackenridgea
- Species: B. elegantissima

Binomial name
- Brackenridgea elegantissima (Wall.) Kanis (1968)

Synonyms
- Brackenridgea denticulata Furtado (1962); Brackenridgea hookeri (Planch.) A.Gray (1853); Brackenridgea perakensis Tiegh. (1902); Euthemis elegantissima Wall. (1824); Gomphia hookeri Planch. (1847); Ouratea hookeri (Planch.) Burkill (1935)

Species of flowering plant

Brackenridgea elegantissima is a species of flowering plant in the family Ochnaceae. It is a tree native to the Andaman Islands, Myanmar, Thailand, Peninsular Malaysia, Singapore, and Borneo.
