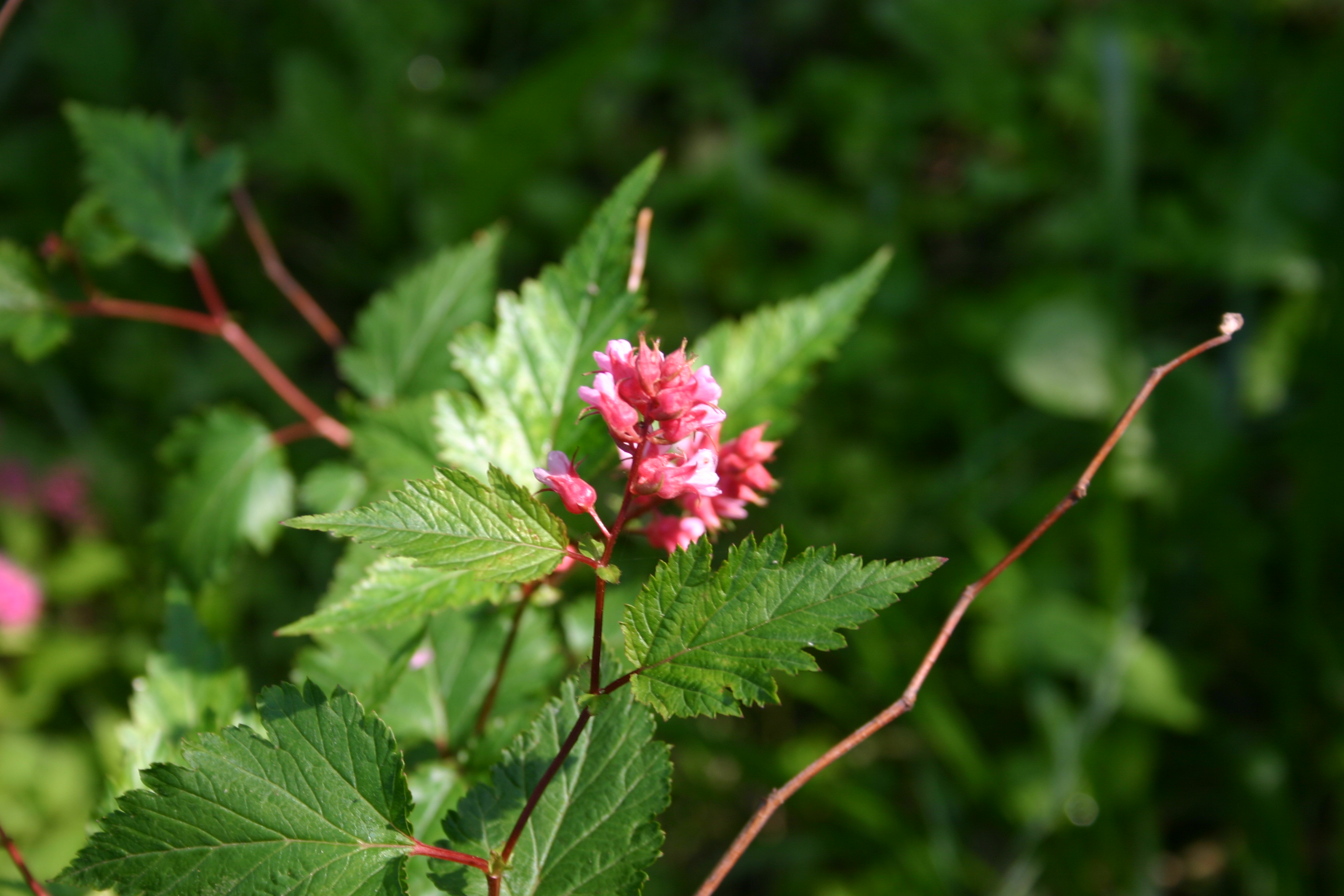
- Neillia sinensis

Scientific classification
- Kingdom: Plantae
- Clade: Tracheophytes
- Clade: Angiosperms
- Clade: Eudicots
- Clade: Rosids
- Order: Rosales
- Family: Rosaceae
- Subfamily: Amygdaloideae
- Tribe: Neillieae
- Genus: Neillia; D.Don

Species
- See text

Synonyms
- Stephanandra Siebold & Zucc.

= Neillia =

Genus of shrubs

Neillia is a genus of the botanical family Rosaceae. They are deciduous shrubs or subshrubs. They produce clusters of terminal or axillary flowers, and have dry dehiscent fruits. They are native to eastern and central Asia.

This genus is named for Patrick Neill.

== Species ==
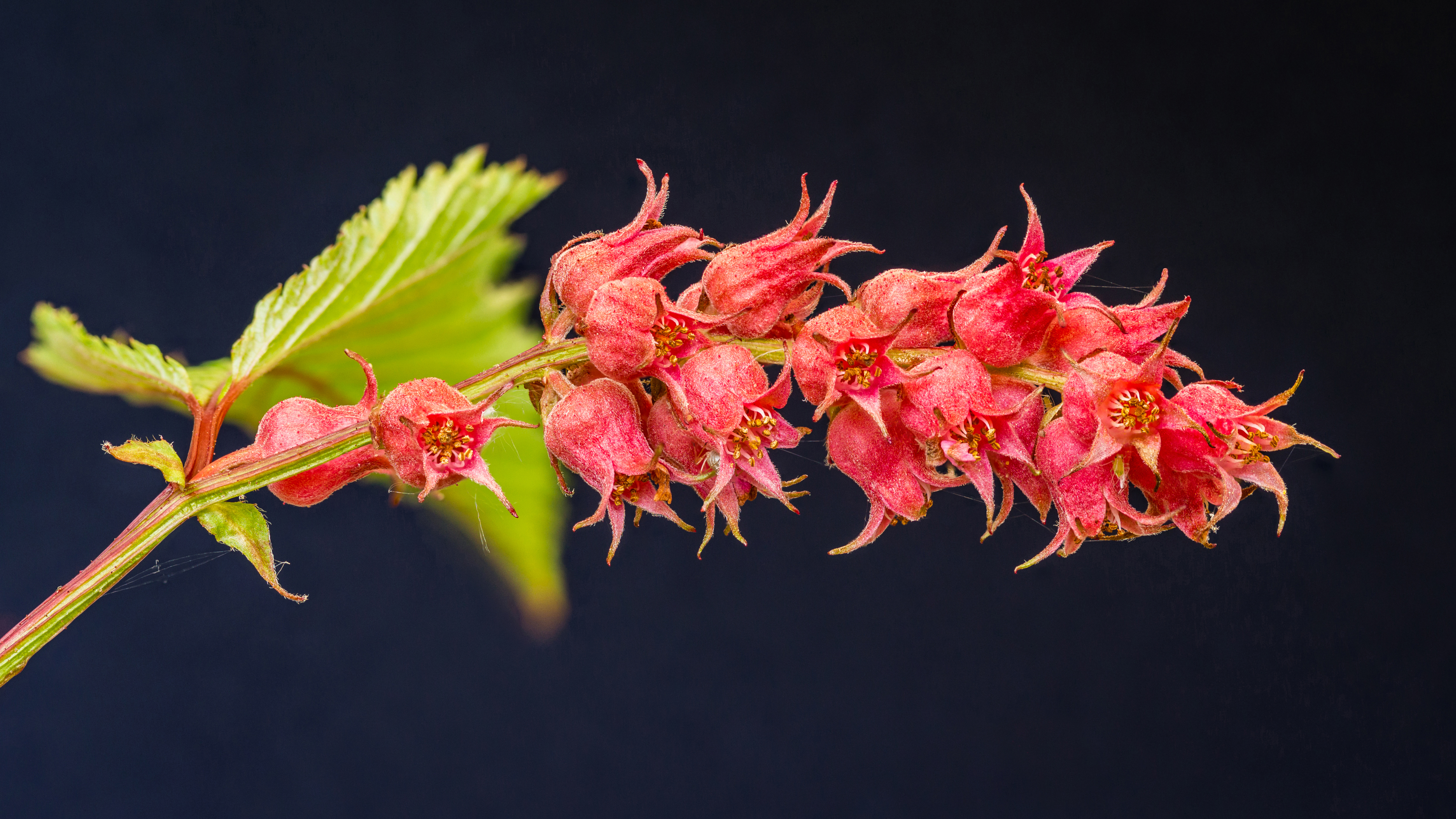
Flowers of the Neillia affinis species

This genus contains around fifteen to seventeen species. Recent phylogenetic analysis has shown that the genus Stephanandra is embedded in Neillia, and is perhaps the evolutionary result of hybridization within Neillia lineages. Because of this, the former members of Stephanandra are included in this classification.

The species of Neillia are:

- Neillia affinis
- Neillia breviracemosa
- Neillia densiflora
- Neillia fugongensis
- Neillia gracilis
- Neillia grandiflora
- Neillia incisa – lace shrub
- Neillia jianggangshanensis
- Neillia ribesioides
- Neillia rubiflora
- Neillia serratisepala
- Neillia sinensis
- Neillia sparsiflora
- Neillia tanakae
- Neillia thibetica
- Neillia thrysiflora
- Neillia uekii
