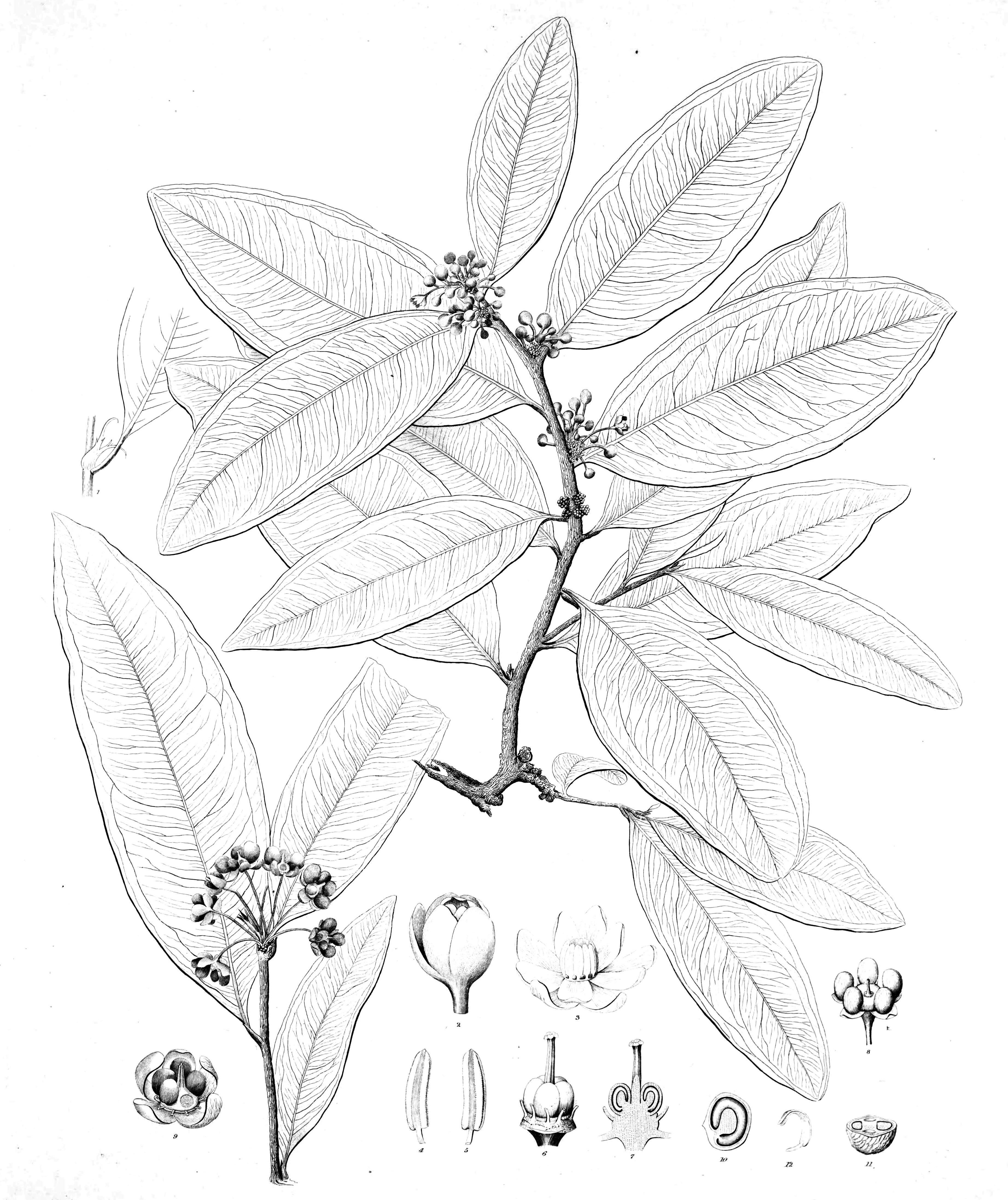

Conservation status
- Least Concern (IUCN 3.1)

Scientific classification
- Kingdom: Plantae
- Clade: Embryophytes
- Clade: Tracheophytes
- Clade: Angiosperms
- Clade: Eudicots
- Clade: Rosids
- Order: Malpighiales
- Family: Ochnaceae
- Genus: Brackenridgea
- Species: B. nitida

Binomial name
- Brackenridgea nitida A.Gray (1854)

Subspecies
- Brackenridgea nitida subsp. australiana (F.Muell.) P.O.Karis; Brackenridgea nitida subsp. nitida

= Brackenridgea nitida =

Species of flowering plant

Brackenridgea nitida is a species of flowering plant in family Ochnaceae. It is a shrub or tree native to Fiji and Queensland.

Two subspecies are accepted:

- Brackenridgea nitida subsp. australiana (F.Muell.) P.O.Karis (synonyms Brackenridgea australiana F.Muell., Campylopora australiana (F.Muell.) Tiegh., and Gomphia australiana F.Muell.) – northern Queensland
- Brackenridgea nitida subsp. nitida – Fiji

In Fiji it is native to the islands of Viti Levu, Vanua Levu, and Rabi, where it grows in dry open forests and dry transition forests.
