= Niš Commonwealth Military Cemetery =

Commonwealth War Graves Cemetery, Niś, Serbia

Commonwealth Military Cemetery
- Ратно војно гробље Британског Комонвелта
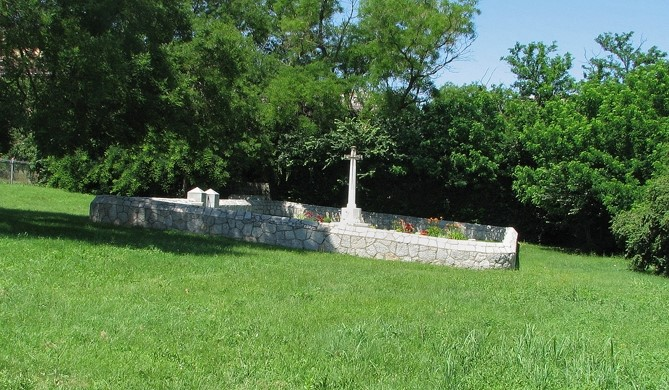
- Interactive map of Commonwealth Military Cemetery

Details
- Location: Palilula, Niš
- Country: Serbia
- Coordinates: 43.30742°N 21.92905°E
- Type: Military

The Commonwealth Military Cemetery (Serbian: Ратно војно гробље Британског Комонвелта, romanized: Ratno vojno groblje Britanskog Komonvelta) is located in Niš, Serbia in the municipality of Palilula. It is listed as a Protected Cultural Monument of the Republic of Serbia (Identification Number SK 689). The cemetery's address is 1 Miladina Popovića Street, in the district of Delijski of Niš and approximately 500 metres from the Skull Tower (Ćele kula). For that reason, it is also sometimes listed as Chele Kula Military Cemetery.

It was opened in 1915, when 19 soldiers of the British Army died at the Niš military hospital; in 1919, 21 other soldiers from the same detachment were buried there. According to V. Milić's account, there are a total of 41 British graves in the cemetery, of which 28 are army soldiers, three sailors, three marines and seven nurses who served in the Serbian army. However, the Commonwealth War Graves Commission (CWGC) lists 39 military graves and different numbers for the various services. Its full list can be read on the CWGC website. With the exception of the soldiers, all died in the flu epidemic that followed the end of the First World War.

The cemetery was laid out in 1929 and was built by the Commonwealth War Graves Commission to a design by Sir Robert Lorimer. According to the historian Aleksandar Dinčić, the inauguration of the cemetery took place on 12 May 1929, in the presence of the British representative Howard William Kennard, the president of the municipality of Niš Dragiša Cvetković and General Miloš Nikodijević representing the king of Yugoslavia.

== Design ==
The memorial complex is surrounded by an iron fence, while the British Military Cemetery is surrounded by a stone wall approximately 70 cm high. Within this limited space extending over approximately 2 acres are 41 commemorative plaques, arranged in six regular rows, with the name and surname, the unit and the year of death . The plinths and slabs are in concrete, with the exception of two more recent ones, which are in marble. In the central part of the cemetery stands a concrete monument 4.50 m high in the shape of a cross; at the junction of the arms of the cross is a metal sword which symbolizes struggle and war; on the pedestal of the monument, we can read an inscription in English:

"This cross is erected in memory of the victims of the Great War who fought in France, Belgium and other parts of the world. Their names will live forever more"

According to historian Aleksandar Dinčić, this cemetery is one of three British cemeteries that existed in the former Kingdom of Yugoslavia, in addition to those in Skopje and Vrnjačka Banja.

== British nurses and doctors buried in the Cemetery ==
Seven nurses are buried at the cemetery:

- Augusta Minshull of the Scottish Women's Hospital
- Bessie Gray Sutherland of the Scottish Women's Hospital
- Agnes Kerr Earl of the Scottish Women's Hospital
- Madge Neill Fraser of the Scottish Women's Hospital
- Louisa Jordan of the Scottish Women's Hospital
- Cicely Mary Leigh Pope of the Voluntary Aid Detachment
- Margaret Caroline C. Ryle of the Voluntary Aid Detachment

Ryle's funeral was described in February 1915, by a visiting Canadian nurse who attended, and her description was read by Hon. Caroline Lucas MP, at the 2018 Armistice centenary service held in St. Mary's Church, in her home town of Brighton.

The tombs of two doctors who died of typhus whilst in service in Serbia, are described in 1916, by Dr. Caroline Twigge Matthews, as 'two little granite crosses' and the graveyard itself as 'wild and overgrown with wildflowers, oxen stray about.' and she said that they 'gave their lives for the sick in an enemy's country (sic)' and noted that ' the Serbians are grateful.'
