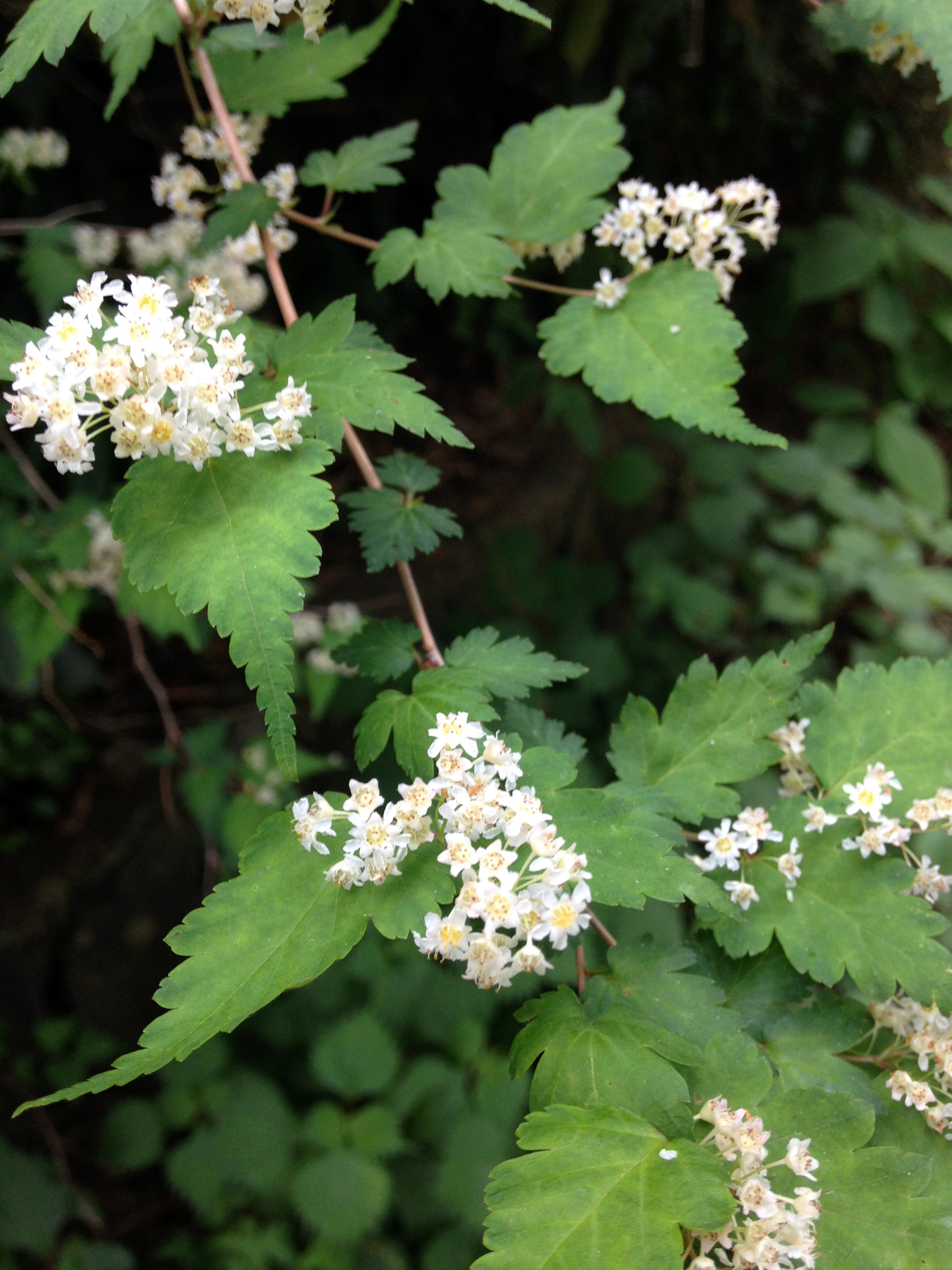

Scientific classification
- Kingdom: Plantae
- Clade: Tracheophytes
- Clade: Angiosperms
- Clade: Eudicots
- Clade: Rosids
- Order: Rosales
- Family: Rosaceae
- Genus: Neillia
- Species: N. incisa

Binomial name
- Neillia incisa (Thunberg) S.H.Oh

Synonyms
- Opulaster flexuosus (Siebold & Zucc.) Kuntze; Physocarpus flexuosus (Siebold & Zucc.) Kuntze; Spiraea incisa Thunb. Stephanandra flexuosa Siebold & Zucc. Stephanandra incisa (Thunb.) Zabel; Stephanandra incisa f. quadrifissa (Nakai) M.Kim; Stephanandra quadrifissa Nakai

= Neillia incisa =

Species of shrub

Neillia incisa, commonly called lace shrub, is a species of plant in the rose family (Rosaceae). It is native to eastern Asia, where it is found in China, Japan, Korea, and Taiwan. In the United States it is commonly cultivated by nurseries as an ornamental, and it has been naturalized in the U.S. state of Virginia. It is expected to become invasive in temperate forests of North America in the future.

It is a deciduous shrub, growing to 2.5 meters tall. It has deeply lobed leaves, with prominent stipules. It produces panicles of small white flowers in late spring and early summer. Fruits are pubescent and around 2 mm long.

Its natural habitat is on low mountain slopes, often by streams. It is considered to be a common species in Japan.
