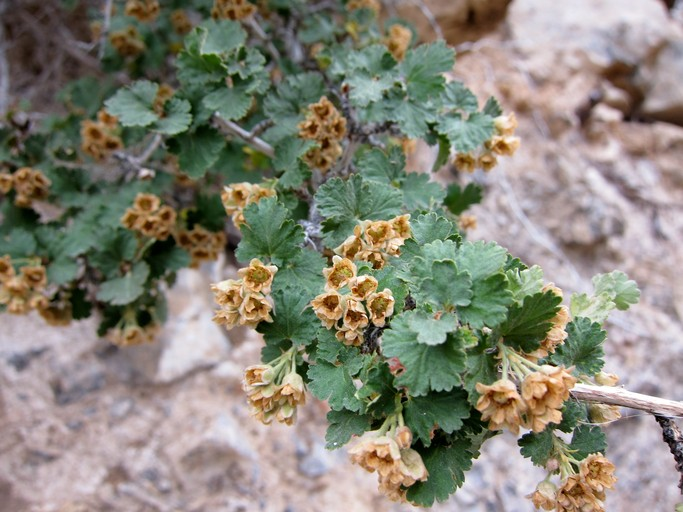

Scientific classification
- Kingdom: Plantae
- Clade: Tracheophytes
- Clade: Angiosperms
- Clade: Eudicots
- Clade: Rosids
- Order: Rosales
- Family: Rosaceae
- Genus: Physocarpus
- Species: P. alternans

Binomial name
- Physocarpus alternans (M.E.Jones) J.T.Howell

= Physocarpus alternans =

Species of shrub

Physocarpus alternans also known as dwarf ninebark and Nevada ninebark is a flowering shrub native to east California, currently found throughout Western North America. It was first described by J.T.Howell in 1931. It prefers growing on dry, rocky slopes, grows in pinyon and juniper shrublands, also found near limestone outcrops. It has been found to grow at elevations of 1800 to 3100 m above sea level. Aside from the native California specimens have been collected in Nevada, Utah, Idaho and Colorado. It flowers in June and July, producing small, white flowers.

== Description ==
Physocarpus alternans grows to a height of 50 to 150 cm. It forms leaves with 3 to 7 shallow lobes. Leaves possess small, rounded teeth along the margin. Flowers, densely hairy, form in bunches of up to around ten. The hypanthium measures 1.7 to 3 mm in length and up to 3.2 to 5 mm in diameter at the rim. Petals are 2.5 to 3 mm long. The longest filaments measure up to 1.3 to 2.5 mm in length. Fruit are 3.5 to 4 mm in diameter, densely hairy.
