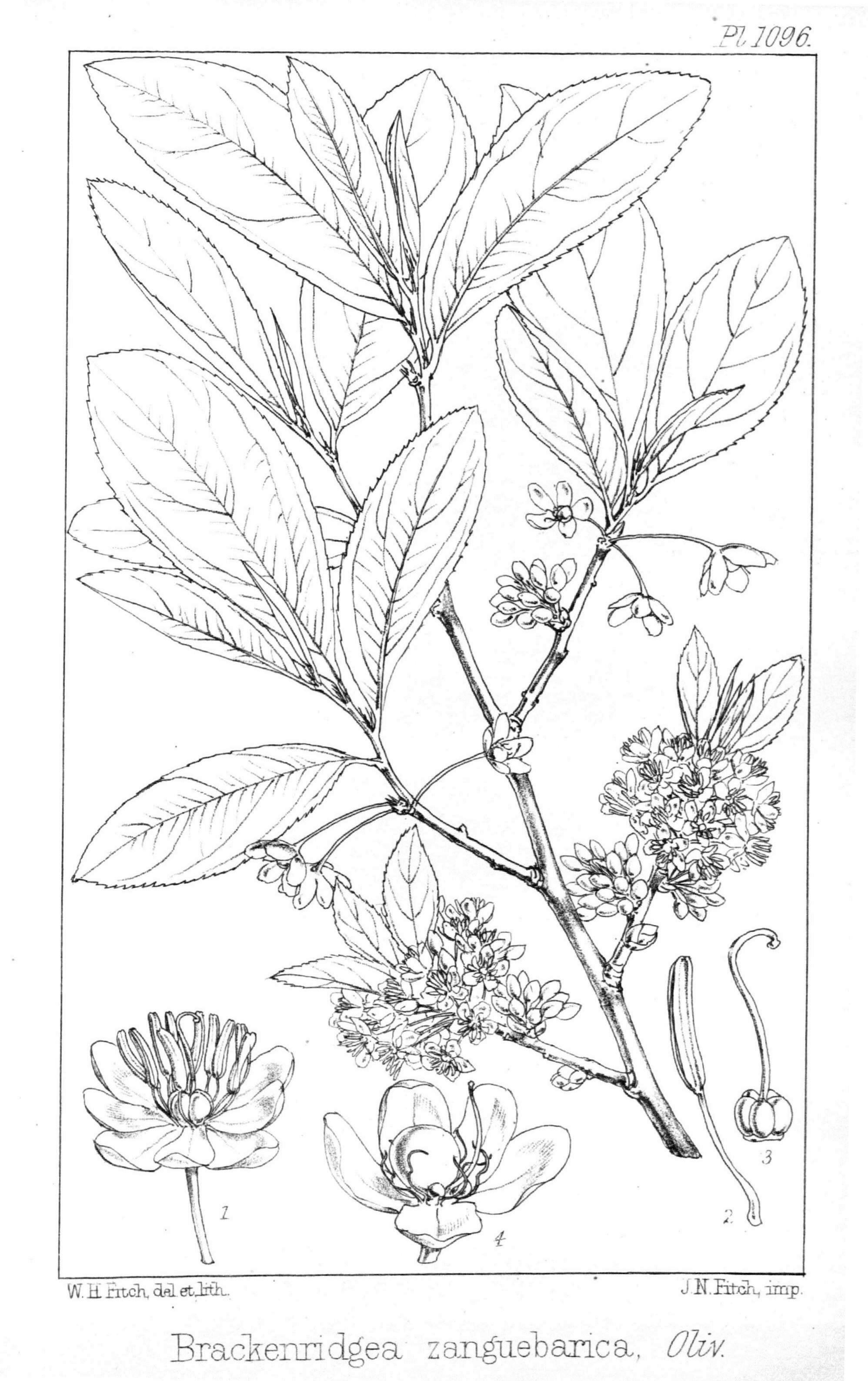

Conservation status
- Critically endangered (SANBI Red List)

Scientific classification
- Kingdom: Plantae
- Clade: Tracheophytes
- Clade: Angiosperms
- Clade: Eudicots
- Clade: Rosids
- Order: Malpighiales
- Family: Ochnaceae
- Genus: Brackenridgea
- Species: B. zanguebarica

Binomial name
- Brackenridgea zanguebarica Oliv. (1871)

Synonyms
- Brackenridgea bussei Gilg; Pleuroridgea zanguebarica (Oliv.) Tiegh.

= Brackenridgea zanguebarica =

Yellow peeling plane

Species of flowering plant

Brackenridgea zanguebarica, the yellow peeling plane, is a species of plant in the family Ochnaceae. It is native to the southeastern Afrotropics. The bark of the tree is locally in high demand for traditional medicine.

It is known locally as Mutavhasindi among native healers in Vhembe district of South Africa.

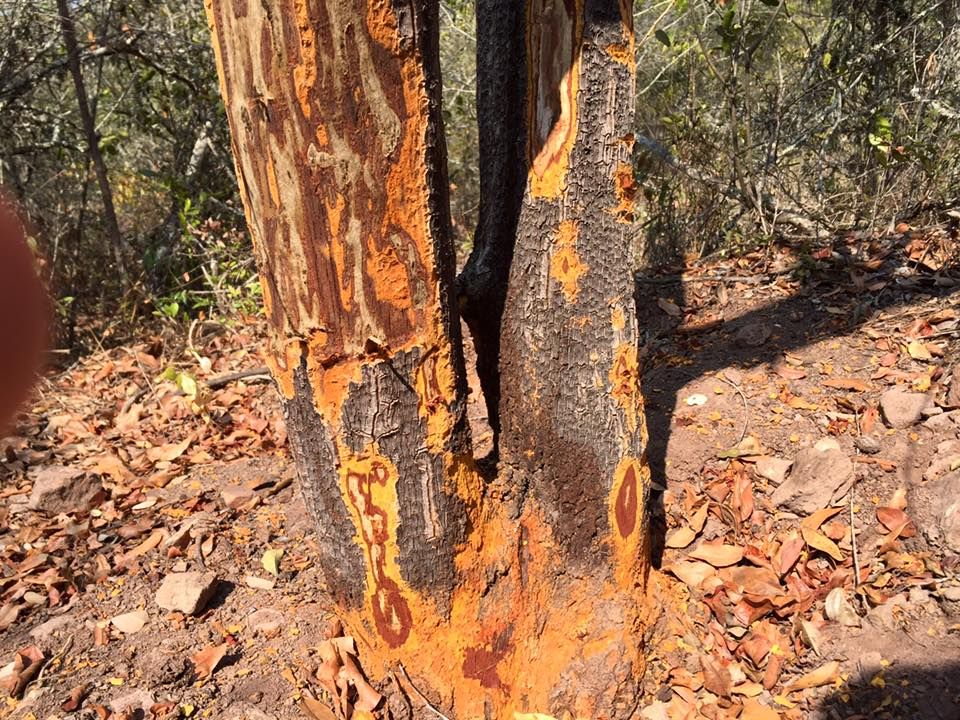
Bark of a tree protected in Brackenridge Reserve, Limpopo

== Description ==
The plant grows either as a shrub or tree, it is a deciduous species that can reach a height of 10 m. The bark is corky and furrowed often greyish in colour but sometimes black with yellow pigments and a yellow inner bark. Leaves are petiolate, the stipules are markedly longitudinally striate. Leaflets are obovate to elliptic in outline, up to 5 cm long and 3 cm wide and with a toothed margin. The flowers are whitish to cream in colour and are solitary or in clusters of 2-8.

== Range ==
It occurs in Kenya, Tanzania, Malawi, Mozambique, Zimbabwe and very locally Limpopo Province of South Africa, where it is endangered. Occurs in wooded grasslands and forest margins.

== Conservation status ==
In South Africa, the yellow peeling plane is categorised as Critically Endangered in the SANBI Red List of South African Plants due to its limited range; known from a single location in the Thengwe district in Venda. From 1990 to 1997, it saw an 87% reduction in population. It is in danger of extinction as a consequence of overharvesting of the bark in the traditional medicinal trade, as a wood fuel, livestock overgrazing and habitat destruction from agriculture encroachment.

== Uses ==
The stem bark and root extracts of the plant is used in native medicine to treat a variety of ailments that include amenorrhea, conjunctivitis, wound treatment and venereal diseases.
