= Royal Caledonian Horticultural Society =

Commemorative plaque marking the Royal Caledonian Horticultural Society's establishment, George Street, Edinburgh

The Royal Caledonian Horticultural Society (RCHS), also known as the Caley, is the national horticultural society of Scotland, and was founded in 1809. Members include both amateur and professional, generalists, specialists and those who simply like gardens and gardening. The aim of the society is to inspire, encourage and support the science, art and practice of all types of horticulture in Scotland and to advance education in gardening and horticulture for everyone. It was a founding part in the establishment of 'Gardening Scotland'.and in the formation of the 'Scottish Gardeners Forum', organisations with which it continues to maintain strong links.

== Leadership ==
The Princess Royal is the current patron of the RCHS.

The current president is Lewis Normand, recent past presidents have included David Knott SHM, Pam Whittle CBE, George Anderson MBE SHM and Professor Fred T. Last.

The society's secretary/administrator (currently Jillian Laird) is responsible for the day-to-day administration of the society. Previous secretaries include Julie Muir, Alison Murison, Tom Mabbott, who was appointed an MBE for services to Scottish Horticulture, John MacLennan, and Dr. John MacKay. The first secretary was Dr. Andrew Duncan who was also involved with the formation of the Royal College of Physicians of Edinburgh.

== Awards ==
Each year the society presents a range of medals and awards that recognise an individual's contribution to Scottish horticulture. These include:

- the Scottish Horticultural Medal SHM (the highest accolade and strictly limited to a maximum of 50)
- the Andrew Duncan Medal (awarded for distinguished service by an educationalist, advisor or administrator)
- the Queen Elizabeth, The Queen Mother Medal in Horticulture (awarded for outstanding service by a non professional. Introduced in 1990 to mark the 90th birthday of the society's Patron who was the first recipient and an active member of the society)
- the Dr Patrick Neill Medal, (a medal awarded to a Scottish botanist or cultivator. It is the award with the longest history having been established in Dr Patrick Neill's will in 1851.
- Certificates of Merit (awards that acknowledge a wide range of service gardening and horticulture in Scotland).
- the Carter-Patterson Memorial Medal (awarded to a high achieving horticulture student or apprentice).

== Charitable Aims ==
The core charitable aim of the society is to advance education in gardening and horticulture for the public benefit. In order to fulfil this aim the society

- maintains key elements of Saughton Park, and a large demonstration allotment,
- runs a horticultural award scheme called 'Grow and Learn', that recognises individual progress and achievement through experiential learning and personal development for people with complex learning needs or a learning disability.
- offers an innovative programme of events, workshops and talks for everyone.

== Events ==
The society holds a number of shows at Saughton Park. The annual Spring Bulb Show is held on the first weekend April and other shows including Auricula & Primula, Cacti & Succulents, and early Autumn Show at Saughton Park as well as an Apple day in early October.

== Publications ==
Publications include an annual quality journal, The Caldeonian Gardener, focusing on horticulture in Scotland.

== Partnerships ==
The society is a key partner, along with City of Edinburgh Council in the re-development of Saughton Park, Edinburgh. The society's base at Saughton provides an office base along with teaching and demonstration areas within the park.

== See also ==
- Botanical Society of Scotland
- Flora of Scotland
