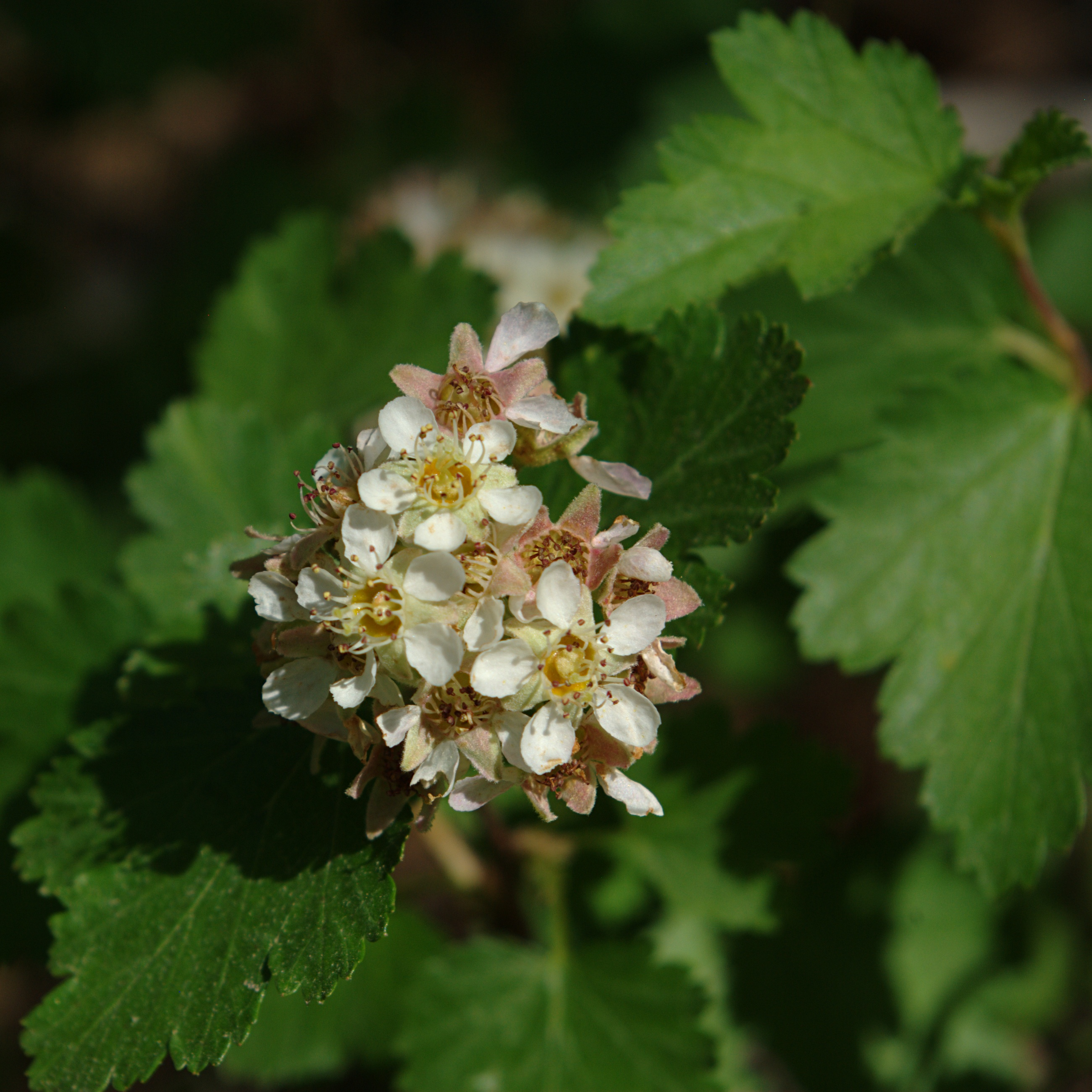

Scientific classification
- Kingdom: Plantae
- Clade: Tracheophytes
- Clade: Angiosperms
- Clade: Eudicots
- Clade: Rosids
- Order: Rosales
- Family: Rosaceae
- Genus: Physocarpus
- Species: P. monogynus

Binomial name
- Physocarpus monogynus (Torr.) J.M. Coult.

= Physocarpus monogynus =

Species of shrub

Physocarpus monogynus, the mountain ninebark or low ninebark, is a flowering shrub of western North America.

== Distribution and habitat ==
Physocarpus monogynus occurs from northern Mexico and west Texas north to Montana and South Dakota and west to Nevada (Elmore 1976, USDA 2008). It grows on slopes, shaded by being in canyons or facing north, at altitudes of 1,700 to 3,000 meters (5,600 to 9,800 ft). The typical habitat, at least in the southern part of its range, is dominated by ponderosa pine and scrub oak (Elmore 1976).

== Description ==
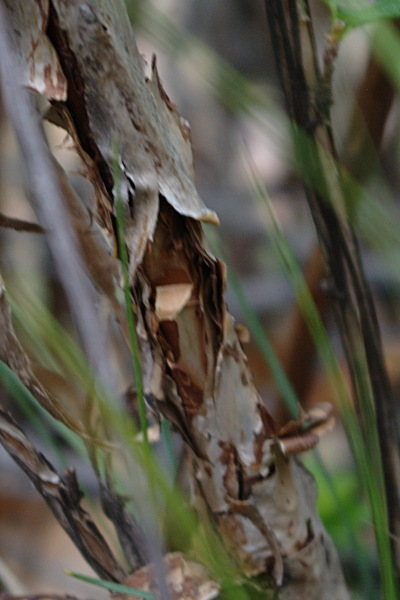
Main stem with peeling bark

The Physocarpus monogynus plant reaches 1.2 meters (3.9 feet) in height and somewhat more in width. The leaves are dull green above and paler below, with 3 to 5 doubly toothed lobes, so they suggest big currant (Ribes) leaves. The bark is brownish and shreds, revealing many layers, hence the name "ninebark" (Elmore 1976).

In May or June, mountain ninebark bears "rather lovely" white or rose-colored flowers, with five petals based in a cup-like structure. The flowers have one style, the meaning of "monogynus" (literally "one female part"). They turn red-brown and stay on the plant into the winter. The seed pods are inflated and covered with white hairs (Elmore 1976). The seeds are bean-shaped, about 2 mm long, bright shiny yellowish (USDA 2008).

== Uses ==
Indians made a pain-relieving poultice by boiling the roots and placing them on the site while still warm.

Rocky Mountain goats eat the twigs when smaller plants are hidden under snow (Elmore 1976).
