= Brackenridgea palustris =

Conservation status
- Near Threatened (IUCN 2.3)

Scientific classification
- Kingdom: Plantae
- Clade: Tracheophytes
- Clade: Angiosperms
- Clade: Eudicots
- Clade: Rosids
- Order: Malpighiales
- Family: Ochnaceae
- Genus: Brackenridgea
- Species: B. palustris

Binomial name
- Brackenridgea palustris Bartell. (1901)

Subspecies
- Brackenridgea palustris subsp. kjellbergii P.O.Karis; Brackenridgea palustris subsp. palustris

Species of tree

Brackenridgea palustris is a tree in the family Ochnaceae. The specific epithet palustris is from the Latin meaning "swampy", referring to the species' habitat.

== Description ==
Brackenridgea palustris grows up to 30 metres (100 ft) tall with a trunk diameter of up to 40 centimetres (20 in). The smooth to scaly bark is brown to reddish brown. The fruits measure up to 0.8 cm (0.3 in) long.

== Distribution and habitat ==
Brackenridgea palustris grows naturally in Sumatra, Peninsular Thailand, Peninsular Malaysia, Singapore, Sumatra, Borneo, and Sulawesi. Its habitat is lowland forests, especially peat swamp and kerangas, to submontane forests, from sea-level to 1,000 metres (3,300 ft) elevation.

== Subspecies ==
Two subspecies are accepted:

- Brackenridgea palustris subsp. kjellbergii P.O.Karis – southern Sulawesi
- Brackenridgea palustris subsp. palustris – Peninsular Thailand, Peninsular Malaysia, Sumatra, and Borneo
