= Margaret Neill Fraser =

First World War heroine, amateur golfer

Margaret (Madge) Neill Fraser
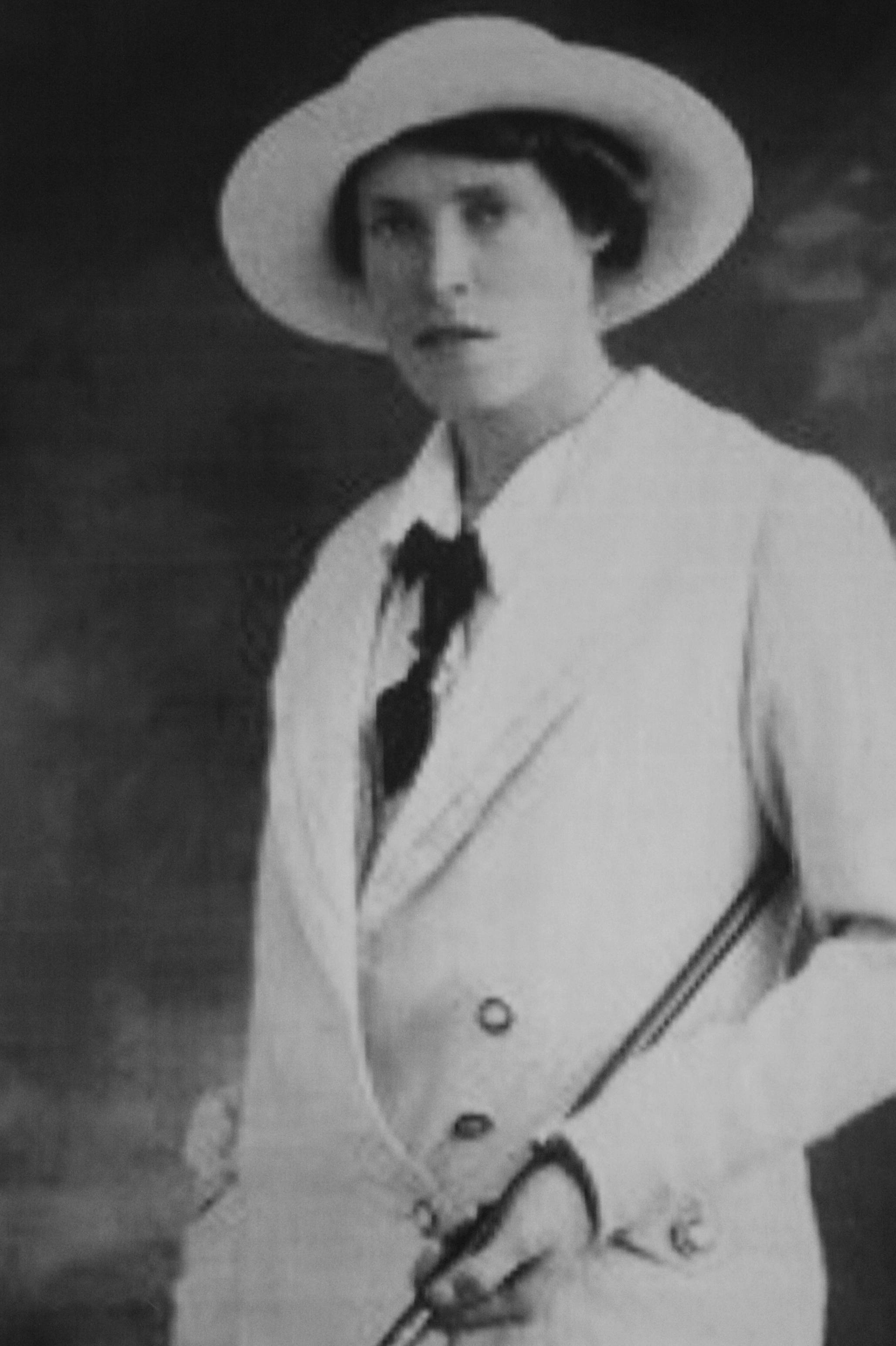
- Margaret Neill Fraser in the Scottish Ladies Golfing Championship 1910

Personal information
- Nationality: Scottish
- Born: 4 June 1880 Edinburgh, Scotland
- Died: 8 March 1915 (aged 34) Serbia
- Resting place: Niš Commonwealth Military Cemetery
- Occupation: nurse

Sport
- Country: Scotland
- Sport: golf

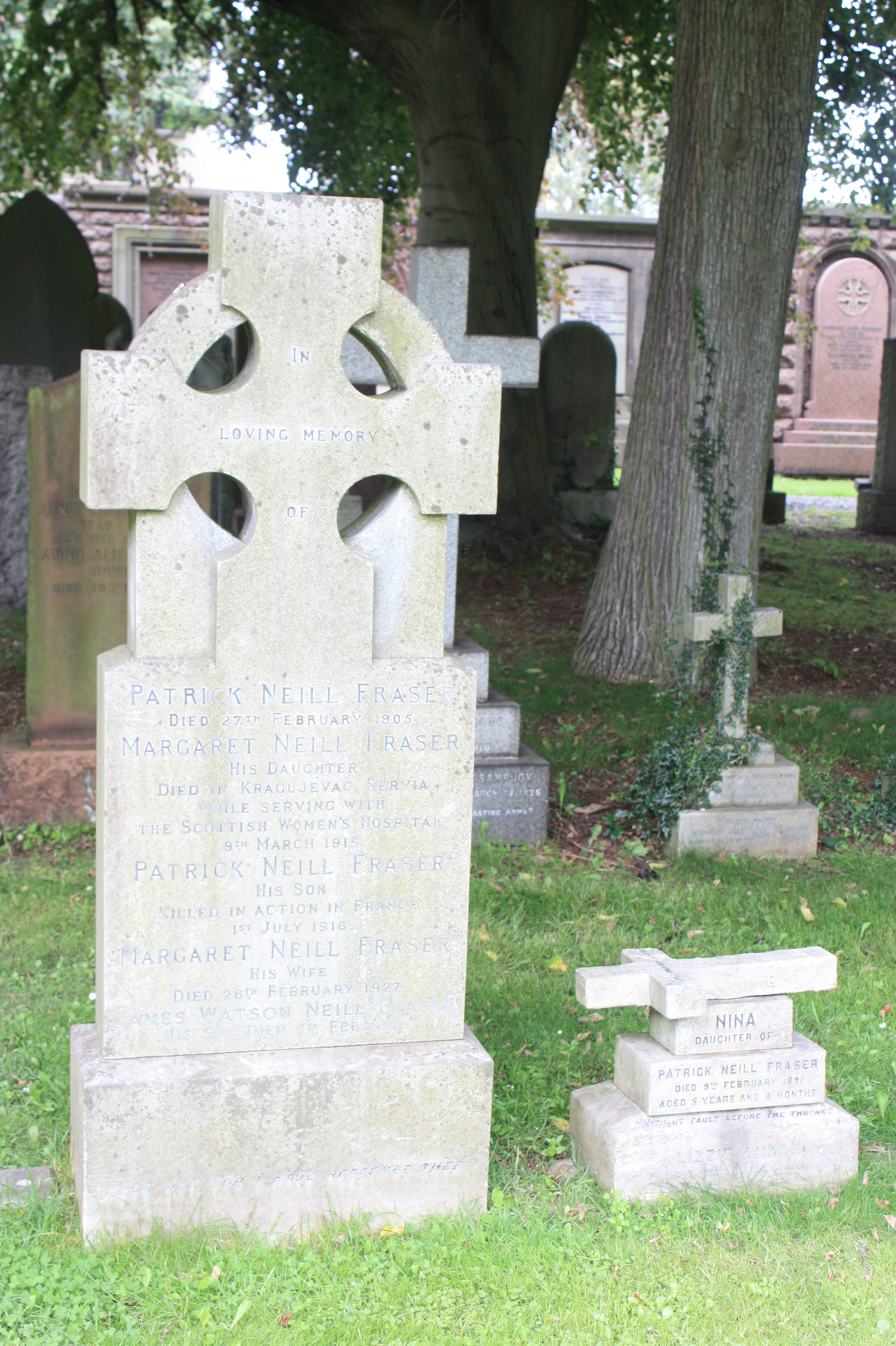
The grave of the Neill Frasers, Dean Cemetery, memorialises Margaret

Margaret (Madge) Neill Fraser (4 June 1880 – 8 March 1915) usually known as Madge, was a Scottish First World War nurse and notable amateur golfer. She represented Scotland at international level every year from 1905 to 1914.

== Life ==
Margaret Neill Fraser was born on 4 June 1880 the daughter of Margaret (d. 1927) and Patrick Neill Fraser FRSE (d. 1905), a botanist. She had an elder sister Rachael A. Neill Fraser (b. 1871) and three brothers: James Watson Neill Fraser (b. 1873), William Neill Fraser (b. 1876) and Patrick (1879–1916). The family lived at Rockville on Murrayfield Road in western Edinburgh and ran the company Neill & Co, who ran a printers and HMO Stationery Office, both at Bellevue and at 13 George Street. The company had been established by her father's great uncle, Patrick Neill.

Fraser's home golf club was Murrayfield Golf Club. She was runner-up in the 1912 Scottish Ladies Golf Championship, beaten by Dorothea Jenkins and semi-finalist in the 1910 British Championship. She played often at internationals in Ranelagh and Barnehurst. Fraser was a member of the Golfing Gentlewomen and the Ladies' Golf Union.

Fraser was a member of the St Andrews Ambulance Association and a trained nurse. At the outbreak of the First World War she volunteered alongside others such as suffragette doctor Elsie Inglis, with Grace Symonds and Dr Elizabeth Ross (1877–1915) to create the Scottish Women's Hospitals in Serbia under the overall umbrella of the French Red Cross. It was locally run by Lady Leila Paget who was married to the ambassador. The majority of the group of women were also suffragettes, for example women doctors surveyed in 1908 had been 538 for the vote and only 15 against. At the time high-profile women golfers, like Fraser were a rarity even being allowed to play on men's courses and wanted to demonstrate responsibility and fair play, thus "most good women golfers of that time tolerated the Suffragists and abhorred the Suffragettes".

Fraser arrived at the hospital in Kragujevac in Serbia in December 1914 in the midst of a typhus epidemic.

Fraser contracted typhus and died on 8 March 1915. Twenty-one other Scottish medical workers died in the same epidemic. Fraser is buried in the Niš Commonwealth Military Cemetery, eastern Serbia. She is memorialised on her parents’ grave stone in Dean Cemetery in Edinburgh.

Fraser's brother, also Patrick Neill Fraser, was a Lieutenant in the Border Regiment and was killed on 1 July 1916, the first day of the Battle of the Somme.

Following Fraser's death, she was described as "perhaps the most popular woman's golfer in Great Britain" the Ladies Golf Union collected funds from international donors sufficient to provide 200 additional beds in Serbian hospitals in her memory. And it was reported that a transport lorry for Elsie Inglis' latest field hospital, was funded by her golfing friends, and seen leading out a column of vehicles by the Serbian Crown Prince George. Fraser's funeral was described as a "terribly sad affair with the funeral party having to struggle through thick snow and mud". She was commemorated on the Scottish Women's Hospitals' Roll of Honour:

There is no Sea
nor Time nor Space nor Division
in
God's dear Home
There is only God and His strong
Love and Peace
and
A GREAT REMEMBERING.
Let us remember before God these women
Who gave their lives in the service of others.

Madge Neill Fraser is the only woman listed on Murrayfield Golf Club's Roll of Honour. The British Journal of Nursing expressed regret at her death, and noted she was a nurse and a chauffeur.

Her name is listed on the globe-shaped memorial to VAD and nurses who died in two world wars, in the National Memorial Arboretum, Alrewas, Staffordshire dedicated by HRH Countess of Wessex, GCVO on 14 June 2018 As the stars in a dark sky they lit up our world.

Fraser's name is also on the Women's Roll of Honour as part of the Five Sisters window in York Minster.
