= Patrick Neill (naturalist) =

British botanist (1776–1851)

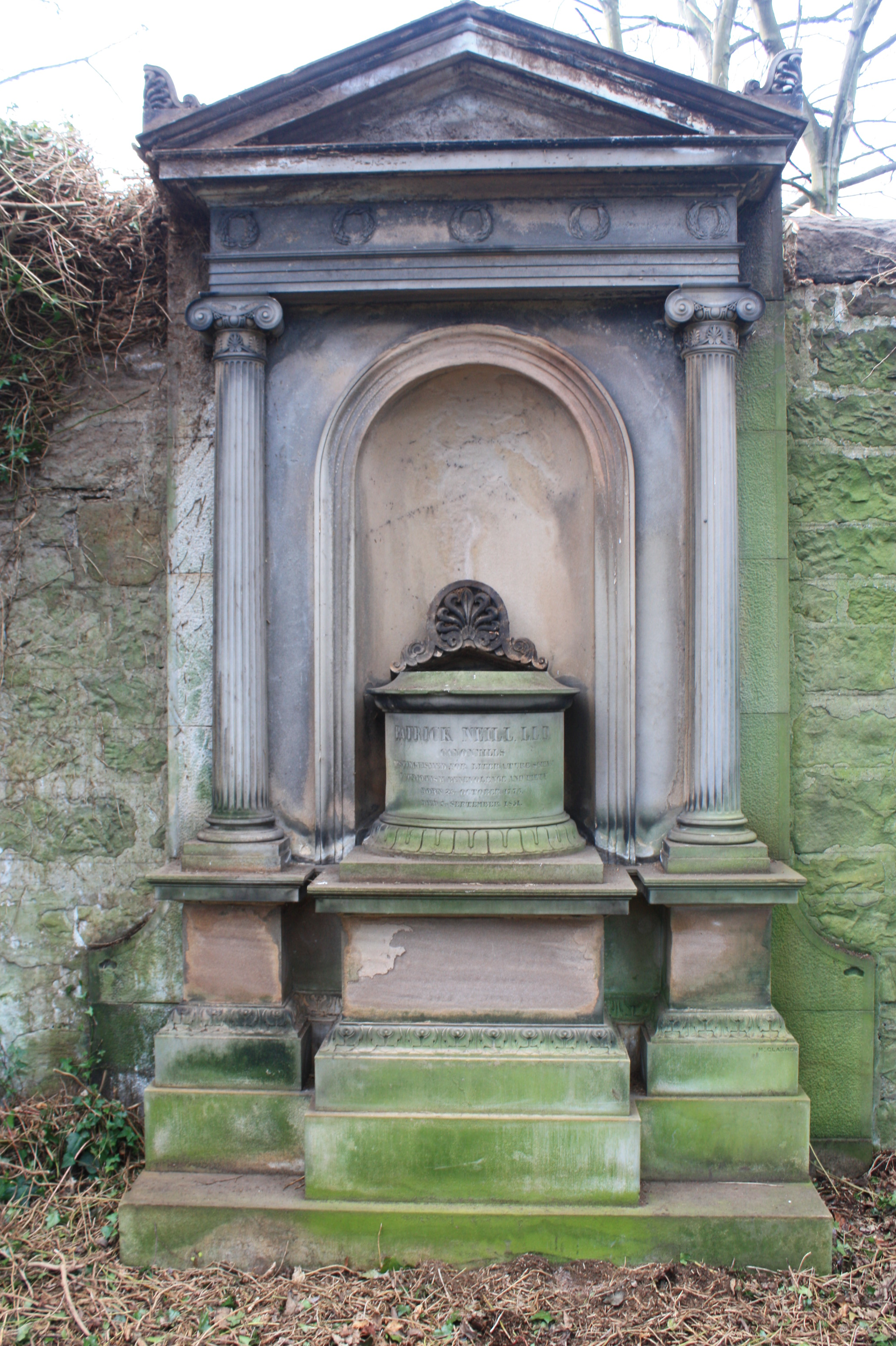
The grave of Patrick Neill, Warriston Cemetery

Patrick Neill FRSE FSA Scot FLS MWS (25 October 1776 – 3 September 1851) was a British printer and horticulturalist, known as a naturalist. A founding member, and the first secretary, of both the Wernerian Natural History Society (1808–49) and the Caledonian Horticultural Society (1809–49), he is mainly remembered today for having endowed the Neill Medal of the Royal Society of Edinburgh.

Neill' works include A Tour Through Some of the Islands of Orkney and Shetland (1806), which caused much public debate at the time, due to its descriptions of the economic misery of the islanders. He also authored the Gardening article in the seventh edition of the Encyclopædia Britannica. This article was subsequently expanded and published as a separate book under the title of The Fruit, Flower, and Kitchen Garden, which was popular and ran through several editions.

When the Nor Loch was drained in 1820, Neill was commissioned to plan the scheme of planting of 5 acres of land, which is now West Princes Street Gardens. This included the planting of 77,000 trees and shrubs.

The rosaceous genus Neillia is named after Neill.

== Life ==
He was born in Edinburgh on 25 October 1776, and spent his life there. He became the head of the large printing firm of Neill & Co., of Edinburgh, but during the last 30 years of his life he took little active part in its management. Early in his career he devoted his spare time to natural history, especially botany and horticulture. The Wernerian Natural History Society was established in 1808, and in 1809 the Caledonian Horticultural Society was founded. Neill was the first secretary of both societies, holding the latter post for forty years.

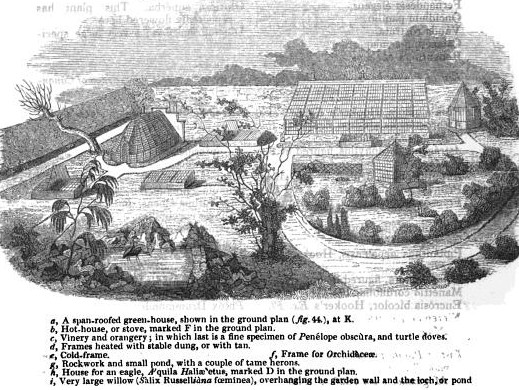
View of Canonmills Cottage Garden, near Edinburgh, from Gardener's Magazine, July 1836.

Neill's residence at Canonmills Cottage (in Canonmills, then near the city of Edinburgh, now a suburb) was open to visitors; and his garden was noted, with William Brackenridge as head gardener before he moved to Berlin. He was Fellow of the Linnean Society and the Royal Society of Edinburgh, and honorary LLD of the University of Edinburgh.

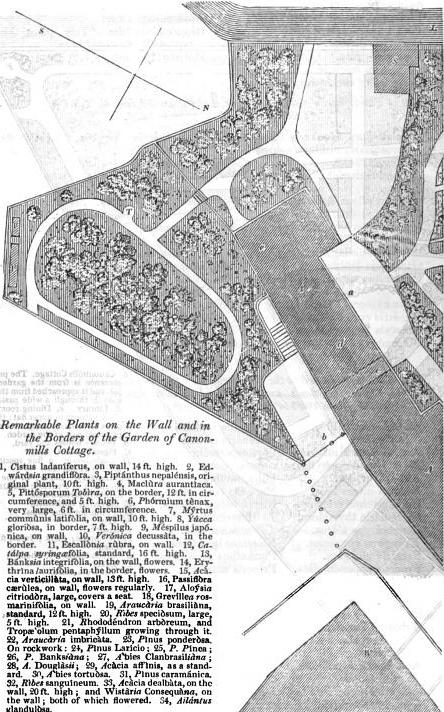
Plan of Canonmills Cottage Garden, near Edinburgh, from Gardener's Magazine, July 1836.

He served as president of the Botanical Society of Edinburgh in 1842–43.

== Death and legacy ==
A short time before his death he became enfeebled by a stroke of paralysis, and after several months of suffering he died at Canonmills on 3 September 1851, and was buried in Warriston Cemetery, on the western wall in the extreme south-west corner of the original cemetery, just west of the archway to the southern extension. His tombstone states that he was "distinguished for literature, science, patriotism, benevolence, and piety". The memorial was restored by the Friends of Warriston Cemetery 2014/2015.

The Royal Society of Edinburgh has John Syme's portrait of Neill.

He died unmarried, and among his various charitable bequests was one of £500 to the Caledonian Horticultural Society to found a medal for distinguished Scottish botanists or cultivators (now the Dr Patrick Neill Medal), and a similar sum to the Royal Society of Edinburgh for a medal to distinguished Scottish naturalists. He is botanically commemorated by the rosaceous genus Neillia.

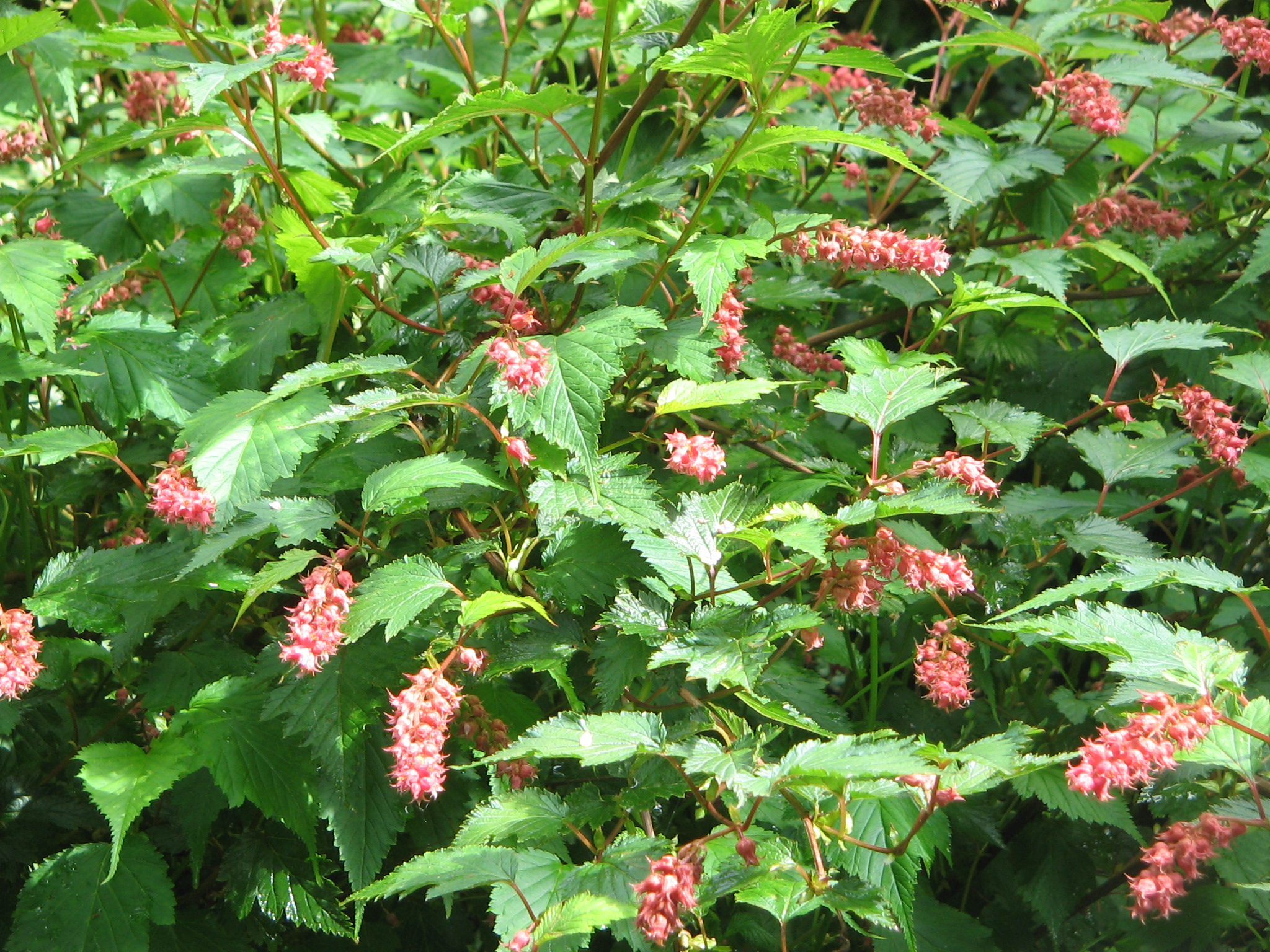
Neillia thibetica.

Edinburgh is indebted to Neill for the scheme of the West Princes Street Gardens. In 1820, that portion of the north loch was drained, and five acres of ground were laid out and planted with seventy-seven thousand trees and shrubs under his direction. He also intervened to preserve several antiquities that were on the point of being demolished.

== Works ==
In 1806 appeared his Tour through Orkney and Shetland, a work which gave rise to discussion because of its reports of poverty. In 1814 he issued a translation, An Account of the Basalts of Saxony, from the French of Dubuisson, with Notes, Edinburgh. He was the author of the article "Gardening" in the seventh edition of the Encyclopædia Britannica, and it was subsequently published as The Flower, Fruit, and Kitchen Garden (several editions). In 1817 Neill, with two other deputies from the Caledonian Society, made a tour through the Netherlands and the north of France, and he wrote an account of it, which was published in 1823.

== Family ==
His great niece was the Scottish lady golfer and First World War heroine, Margaret Neill Fraser who died while serving in Serbia.
