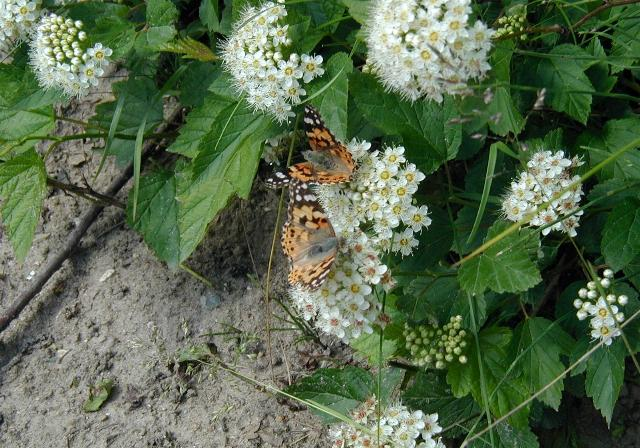

Conservation status
- Apparently Secure (NatureServe)

Scientific classification
- Kingdom: Plantae
- Clade: Tracheophytes
- Clade: Angiosperms
- Clade: Eudicots
- Clade: Rosids
- Order: Rosales
- Family: Rosaceae
- Genus: Physocarpus
- Species: P. malvaceus

Binomial name
- Physocarpus malvaceus (Greene) Kuntze

= Physocarpus malvaceus =

Species of flowering plant

Physocarpus malvaceus is a species of flowering plant in the rose family known by the common name mallow ninebark. It is native to western North America.

== Description ==
This plant is a deciduous shrub usually growing up to 2.1 metres (7 feet) tall, sometimes reaching 3 m (10 ft). It can form dense thickets. The branches are hairless, and older ones have shreddy bark. The leaves have three to five lobes and serrated edges. Dark green when mature, they turn brownish red by early fall. The inflorescence is a corymb of flowers that have white petals measuring about 4 millimetres (1/8 inch) in length. The fruit is a follicle roughly one centimeter long.

== Distribution and habitat ==
The species is native to western North America, where its distribution extends from British Columbia to Nevada to Wyoming.

This shrub grows in forests, woodlands, and oak scrub. The forests are dominated by subalpine fir (Abies lasiocarpa), grand fir (A. grandis), Engelmann spruce (Picea engelmannii), Douglas-fir (Pseudotsuga menziesii) and ponderosa pine (Pinus ponderosa).

== Ecology ==
The shrub is associated with plant species such as oceanspray (Holodiscus discolor), common snowberry (Symphoricarpos albus), mountain snowberry (S. oreophilus), white spirea (Spiraea betulifolia), serviceberry (Amelanchier alnifolia), creeping Oregon-grape (Mahonia repens), and pinegrass (Calamagrostis rubescens). This shrub is codominant with Douglas-fir in a common plant community.

This shrub is a pioneer species that increases after disturbance and decreases as the overstory grows back and shades it out. It grows rapidly after events such as wildfire, sprouting up from its rhizomes. It is considered a "fire-resistant" plant. It survives fire and resprouts, becoming more common on burned sites than unburned.

This is not a favored food plant among wild and domesticated herbivores. It does provide good cover for small animals. The Dusky Flycatcher (Empidonax oberholseri) nests in it.

This plant is known to hamper regeneration of forest habitat after disturbance such as fire or logging. It outcompetes new conifer seedlings. It is controlled with herbicide spray in some regions.
