= Vera Collum =

Journalist, anthropologist, photographer, radiographer and writer.

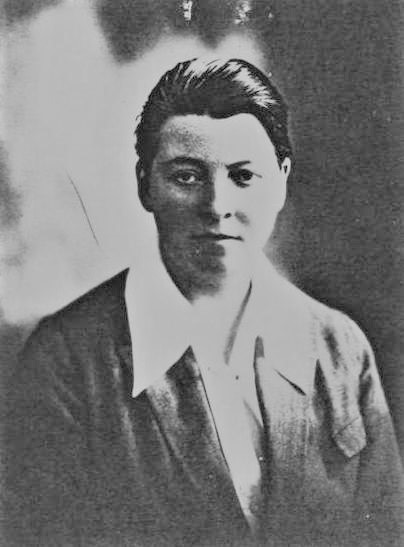
- Born: Vera Christina Chute Collum; 4 April 1883; Umballa, India
- Died: 25 February 1957 (aged 73); Guildford, Surrey, England

Vera Christina Chute Collum (4 April 1883 – 25 February 1957), was a British journalist, suffragist, anthropologist, photographer, radiographer and writer.

== Biography ==
Vera Christina Chute Collum was born in Umballa, India in 1883 to Betty Chute Ellis and Lucius Joseph Collum. She came to England as a child after her father died. Her mother remarried but Collum never got on with her step-father, John Prosser Adams. Her grandfather was the South Australian John Ellis

== World War I ==
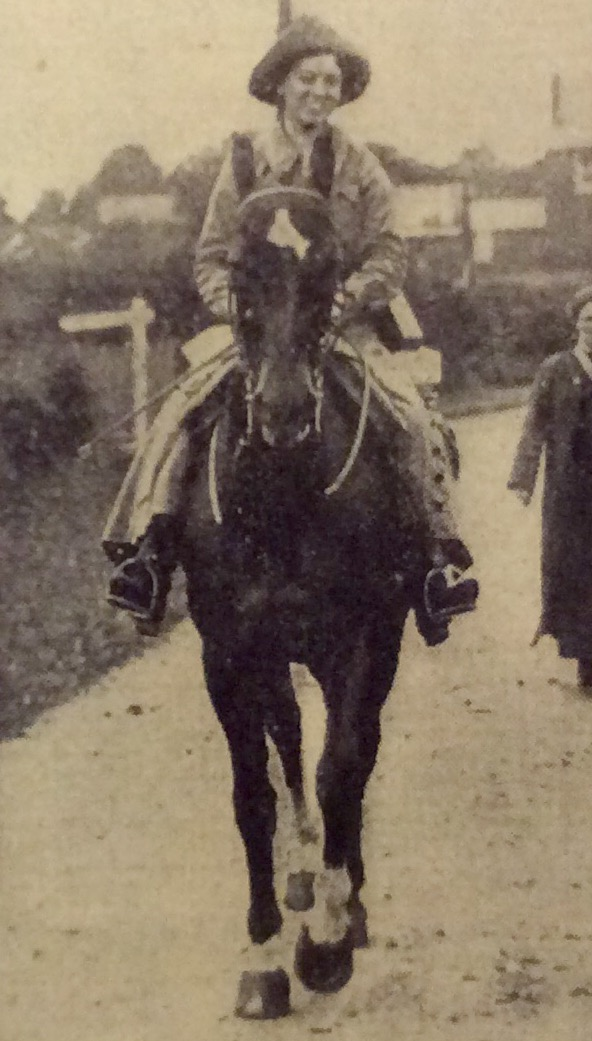
Unknown date and photographer

Collum ran the press office of the National Union of Women's Suffrage Societies in London in 1914. There she was strongly involved in the suffrage movement. When World War I started she volunteered to help with the Scottish Women's Hospitals, serving from February 1915 to November 1917. Her initial deployment was to Royaumont Abbey, the military hospital also called Hôpital Auxiliare which was set up to treat wounded French soldiers. She worked with Ruth Nicholson there. Collum started as an orderly but was then trained as a radiographer in the new department. She became extremely experienced and developed the skill. However, in March 1916 she was sent home for rest and recuperation. But on her return journey on 24 March from Folkestone to Dieppe, her ferry the SS Sussex, was torpedoed. Collum was badly injured. Between 50 and 100 people were killed. Collum was sent back to England for treatment and returned to her post before July 1916. The French Government awarded Collum the Military Health Service honour medal in 1915 and the Croix de Guerre in 1918 for her work. She was awarded the British War Medal and Victory Medal by the British Government. During her time at the hospital she wrote about her experiences for Blackwood's Magazine under the name Skia. Her detailed descriptions of the staff, equipment and situations in the hospital give an invaluable insight into the hospitals of the war especially during the July 1916 offensive.

== After the war ==
After the war Collum was advised to stay away from radiation work after the results of her blood tests came back. She had experienced radiation burns on her hands and neck. Collum then worked as an anthropologist and archaeologist. She wrote extensively. Collum was elected to the Royal Anthropological Institution in London in May 1924 and was a member of the Society of Antiquaries of Scotland. She had no formal education and declared herself a student of the world. She traveled in Japan and the Far East. In 1931 Collum excavated a megalithic tomb at Tressé in Brittany. She worked with Mary Eily de Putron on the le Déhus dolmen and the Delancey Park excavations. Collum moved to Guildford in Surrey where she was living on 25 February 1957 when she died at St Luke's Hospital in the town. In her will she left £15,590 16s 2d.

== Bibliography ==
- Manifold Unity,1940
- The Tressé iron-age megalithic monument (Sir Robert Mond's excavation) : its quadruple sculptured breasts and their relation to the mother-goddess cosmic cult, 1935
- Art in Greece, 1927
- The dance of Civa; life's unity and rhythm, 1927
- Race and history : an ethnological introduction to history, 1926.
- The earth before history : man's origin and the origin of life, 1925
- Prehistoric man : a general outline of prehistory, 1924.
