= Ruth Nicholson =

British obstetrician and gynaecologist

Ruth Nicholson FRCOG
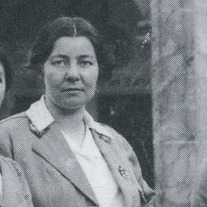
- Ruth Nicholson at the SWH Hospital at Royaumont, France
- Born: 2 December 1884; Newcastle upon Tyne, England
- Died: 18 July 1963 (aged 77); Exeter, England
- Education: Newcastle Church High School; University of Durham Medical College
- Occupations: obstetrician gynaecologist
- Known for: surgical work with Scottish Women's Hospital, Royaumont, France work as Obstetrician and Gynaecologist in Liverpool, England founder member of the Royal College of Obstetricians and Gynaecologists
- Medical career
- Awards: Croix de Guerre; Médaille d’Honneur des Épidémies; FRCOG

Ruth Nicholson FRCOG (2 December 1884 -18 July 1963) was an English obstetrician and gynaecologist who served as a surgeon in the Scottish Women's Hospital at Royaumont, France during the First World War. For this work she was awarded the Croix de Guerre and the Médaille d’Honneur des Épidémies by the French government. After the war she specialised in obstetrics and gynaecology as Clinical Lecturer and Gynaecological Surgeon at the University of Liverpool with consultant appointments at Liverpool hospitals. She was a founder member of the Royal College of Obstetricians and Gynaecologists in 1929, being elevated to fellow of the college in 1931.

== Early life ==
Ruth Nicholson was born in Newcastle upon Tyne, the eldest daughter of Margaret Alison Nicholson (née White) and her husband, Rev. Ralph Nicholson (1856–1930). Her father, born in Burntisland in Fife, became a vicar in the Church of England initially as curate of St Mark's, Newcastle upon Tyne between 1884 and 1892, vicar of St Stephen's, Low Elswick, between 1892 and 1901 and then as vicar of St Stephen's, Newcastle upon Tyne. From 1901 to 1904, he was vicar of St John's Church, Stratford, London, then Vicar of St Luke's, Wallsend, 1908–1912.

After school at Newcastle Church High School, she studied medicine at the Durham University College of Medicine, Newcastle upon Tyne, graduating in 1909 as the only female student in her year.

== Early career ==
After graduating she worked in a local dispensary before moving to Edinburgh, her mother's birthplace, where she worked as assistant to Elsie Inglis, at the Edinburgh Hospital for Women and Children at Bruntsfield. The hospital had been established by the pioneer of medical education for women, Sophia Jex-Blake. Following this she worked in a mission hospital in Gaza, where she gained valuable surgical experience. At the outbreak of World War I her application to serve as a field surgeon was accepted by the War Office, but the chief medical officer of the unit she was to join refused to accept a woman surgeon. She applied to Elsie Inglis, who had founded the Scottish Women's Hospitals (SWH) organisation, and Inglis happily accepted her former assistant as a surgeon in the SWH hospital unit at Royaumont near Paris, the first SWH unit to be set up. She became second-in-command of the unit under the chief medical officer Frances Ivens, with whom she shared the bulk of the major surgical workload. In May 1918 the bed complement at Royaumont was, at the request of the local French commanders increased to 600 beds. As a result, in July 1918 there were so many admissions that three theatres worked all day and two worked all night. Vera Collum wrote "I do not think the médecin-chef Frances Ivens or the second-in-command Miss Nicholson ever got more than three hours rest in the 24 during that strenuous fortnight."

For her service in treating French soldiers at Royaumont, she was awarded the Croix de Guerre and the Médaille d’Honneur des Épidémies by the French government.

== Post war career ==
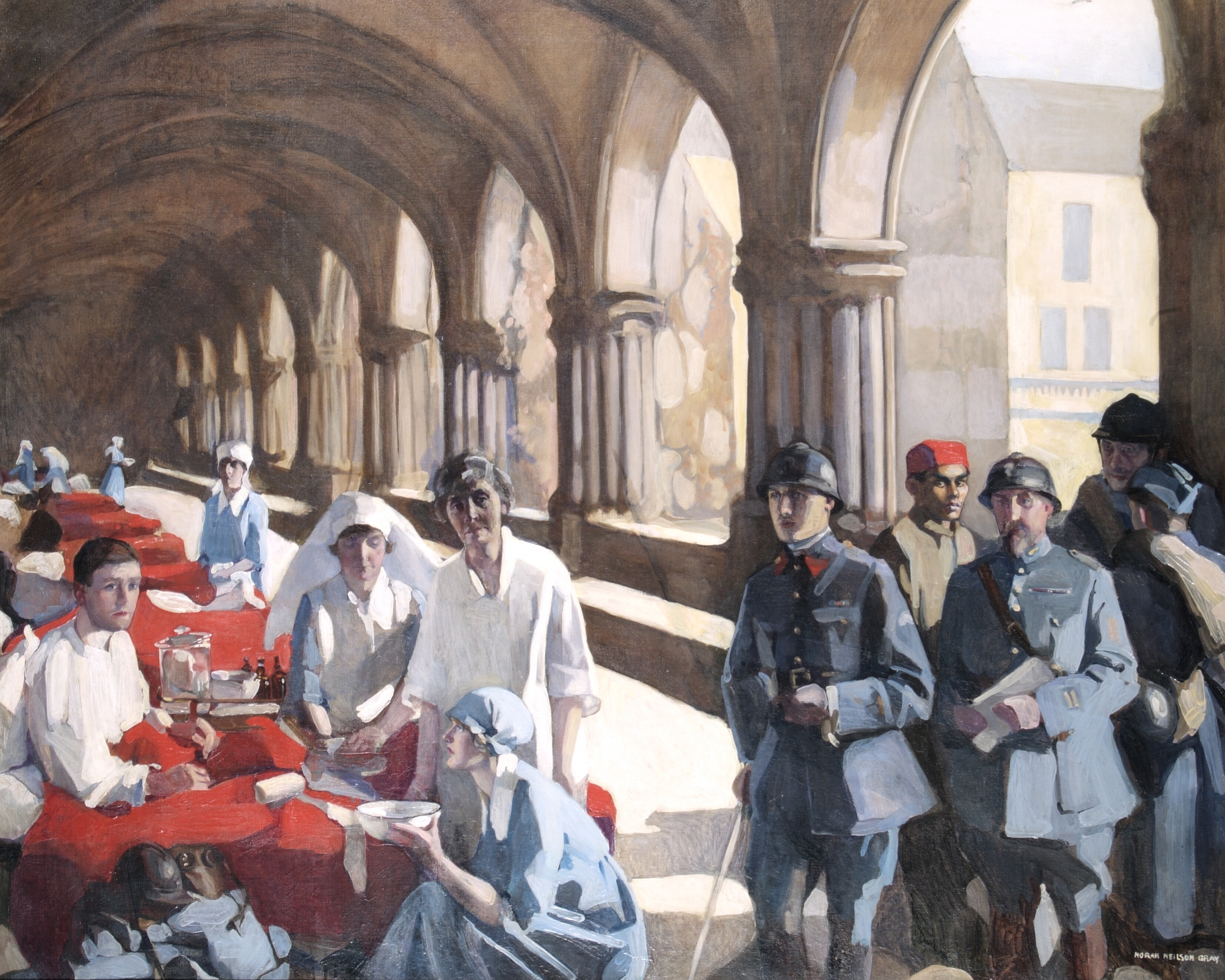
Frances Ivens, staff and patients in the cloisters at Royaumont. Painting by Norah Neilson Gray.

Inspired by her chief Frances Ivens, she decided on a career in obstetrics and gynaecology. Working as a general practitioner in Birkenhead, she prepared for the necessary examinations and became a founder member of the Royal College of Obstetricians and Gynaecologists (MRCOG) in 1929. Following a recommendation from Frances Ivens she was promoted to Fellow of the college (FRCOG) in 1931. She was appointed Clinical Lecturer and Gynaecological Surgeon at the University of Liverpool in 1930 in succession to Frances Ivens and held consultant appointments at Liverpool hospitals in addition to her own private practice. She was the first woman president of the North of England Society of Obstetrics and Gynaecology.

== Later life ==
She retired to South Devon. Like many of her former colleagues at Royaumont she continued to attend Royaumont reunions until 1960. Towards the end of her life she was nursed by a former Royaumont sister. She died in Exeter in 1963 at the age of 77.

== Commemoration ==
A blue plaque commemorating Ruth Nicholson was unveiled at her former home at 32 Kenilworth Road, Elswick, Newcastle upon Tyne on 27 August 2021.
