= Geneviève Hennet de Goutel =

French nurse

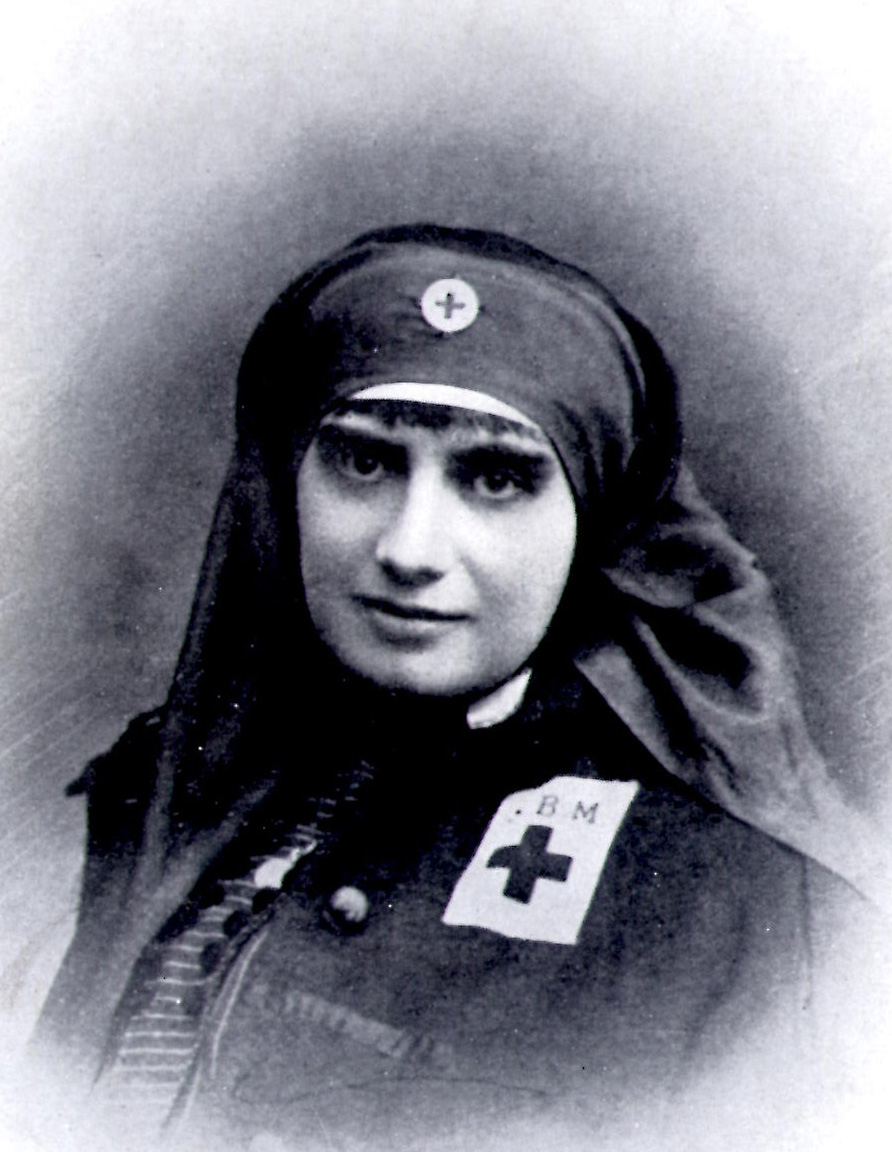
- Born: 11 April 1885; Paris, France
- Died: 4 March 1917 (aged 31); Iași, Kingdom of Romania
- Occupation: Nurse
- Organization: Société de Secours aux blessés militaires (SSBM)
- Awards: Croix de guerre Médaille d'honneur des épidémies (Medal of Honor of the epidemics); Croix de la Reine Marie (Romania)

Geneviève Hennet de Goutel (1885 – 1917) was a French nurse who served during the First World War.

Her maternal family was from Arles, France. She was born in Paris and was active in Saint-Germain-des-Près in Paris. Upon the outbreak of the Great War in 1914, she decided to join the French Red Cross and become a nurse at 29 years old.

From September to October 1916 she directed an auxiliary hospital, before joining a medical mission to Bucharest, where she trained Romanian nurses and wrote a manual for future nurses.

Upon the German army's advances upon Bucharest in December 1916, the mission relocated to Jassy (Iași) where the nurses operated a makeshift field hospital at an abandoned villa, Greierul. She contracted typhus from contagious patients, and died after a month, in March 1917. Queen Marie of Romania reportedly visited her often during her illness. She was buried at the Montparnasse Cemetery.

Shortly after her death, sections of her wartime correspondence were published in the Bulletin de la Croix-Rouge. In 2017, her war diary and letters, compiled by Roxana Eminescu, were published.

She received the Croix de guerre, Médaille d'honneur des épidémies (Medal of Honor of the epidemics) and the Croix de la Reine Marie (Romania) in recognition of her service.

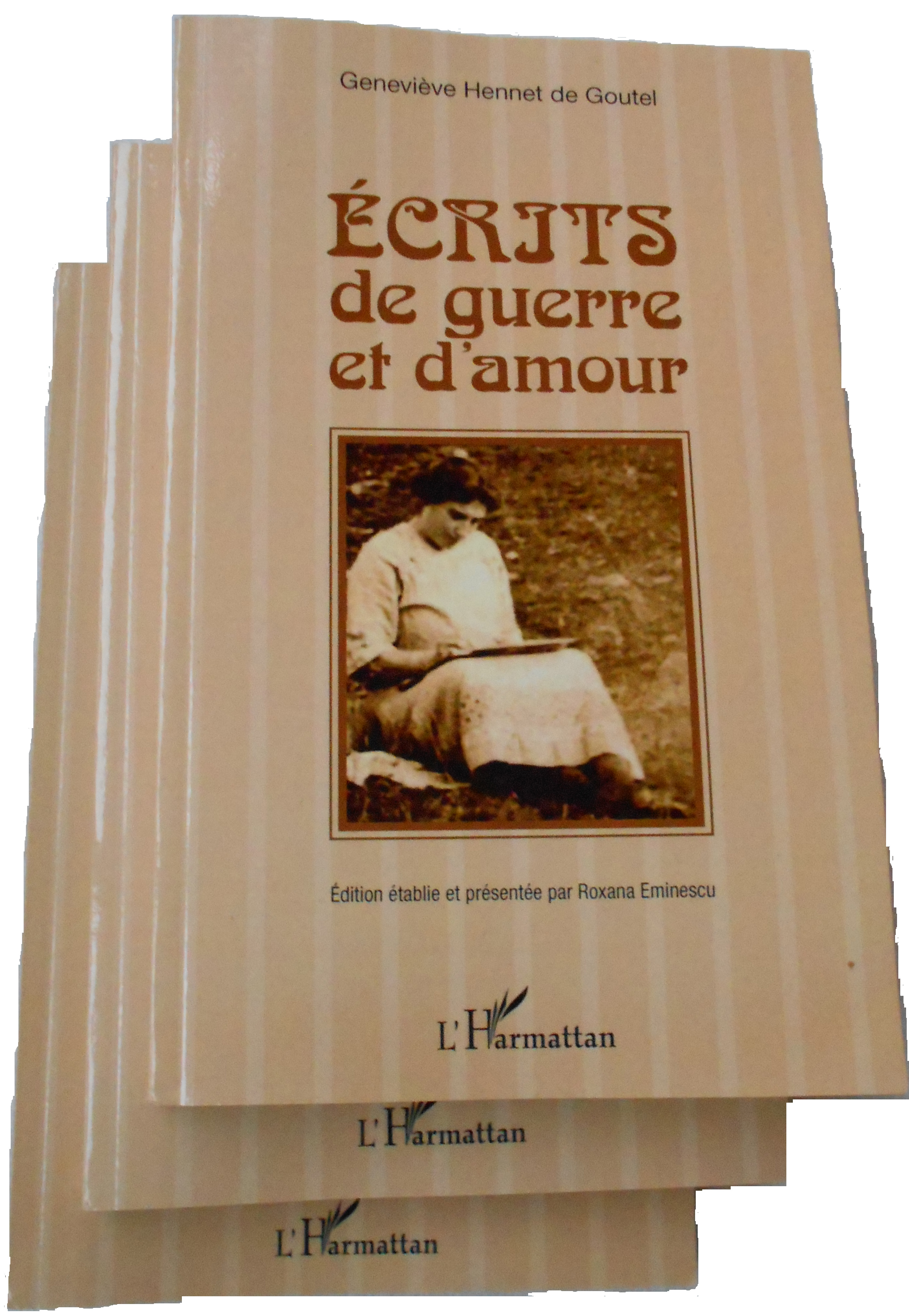
Geneviève Hennet de Goutel, Écrits de guerre et d'amour, L'Harmattan, 2017.
