= Jamaica 1968 human rights stamps =

Jamaican unissued postage stamp series

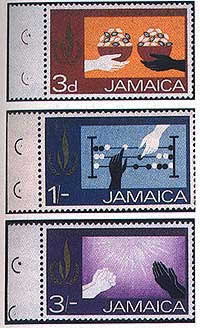
- Country of production: United Kingdom
- Location of production: London
- Date of production: 1968
- Nature of rarity: unissued
- Face value: 3 pence, 1 shilling, 3 shilling
- Estimated value: £140

The Jamaica 1968 human rights stamps were a set of three postage stamps produced to mark the 1968 Human Rights year. The Jamaican postal administration approved the designs by Jennifer Toombs. Upon receipt there were objections to the look of the graphics of the hands in black and white. A new design, using brown hands, was printed locally following weeks of debate. Examples of the unissued stamps are known to exist because they had been distributed to philatelic journalists by the Crown Agents and these were not recalled.

== See also ==
- Postage stamps and postal history of Jamaica
