= Christense Sorensen =

Australian hospital matron and army nurse (1885–1958)

Christense Sorensen MBE RRC
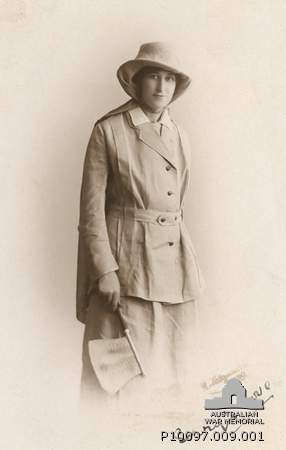
- Picture of Matron Christense Sorensen, taken circa 1915.
- Born: 5 September 1885; Sandgate, Queensland, Australia
- Died: 2 January 1958 (aged 72); Greenslopes, Queensland
- Education: Brisbane General Hospital
- Occupations: Nurse; Matron
- Parent: Conrad Emanuel Sorensen (father) Hannah Maria Antonetta (mother)
- Honours: MBE Royal Red Cross (first class) Médaille des Épidémies

Christense Sorensen MBE RRC (1885–1958) was an Australian hospital matron and army nurse. She served during the First World War and later became a civilian matron. She held positions in the Australian Army Nursing Service, Brisbane General Hospital, and Rosemount Repatriation Hospital. Upon her retirement she had treated more than a million patients.

== Early life ==
Christense Sorensen was born on 5 September 1885 in Sandgate, Queensland. Her father was Conrad Emanuel Sorensen, a drayman and veterinarian from Denmark, and her mother was Hannah Maria Antonetta, originally from Norway. Christense was the youngest of two daughters and was educated at Sandgate State School. When her mother became blind after the birth of her eleventh child, Christense took over looking after the household.

Sorensen decided that she would become a nurse when she was 10 years old after seeing a person with polio.

== Career ==
=== Early career ===
Sorensen began training at the Brisbane General Hospital in September 1910. She continued her training until 1913 after which she was placed in charge of the infectious diseases branch of the hospital. She became a registered nurse on 8 January 1914 and was subsequently promoted to sister.

=== First World War ===
Sorensen was appointed to the Australian Army Nursing Service on 10 November 1914 as a staff nurse. She was posted to No.1 Australian General Hospital in Cairo and then seconded to the Middle East Staff in July 1915. She also served on the British hospital ship Guildford Castle. Sorensen was promoted to sister in December 1915 and was sent to the British Stationary Hospital in Poona, India, in October 1916. She tended to sick soldiers in Poona until January 1917 when she returned to Egypt.

In February 1917, Sorensen was forced to return to Australia due to poor health. In August that year, she returned to duty at No.60 British General Hospital in Salonika. Sorensen was made head nurse and then temporary matron in August 1918. The hospital, which was entirely under canvas, contained 2,000 patients with malaria, dysentery, and blackwater fever.

Sorensen was sent to No.3 Australian Auxiliary Hospital in Dartford in February 1919 and took a massage course at Guy's Hospital. She finally returned to Australia in January 1920 and her A.I.F. appointment ended in March that year.

Sorensen's experiences during the First World War were reported to have given her knowledge which she would not have otherwise received for her profession. Her service was praised by Major (Dr) Lee Abbott who said "Quite a number of cases she absolutely dragged out of the grave by her assiduous care and resource."

=== Civilian nursing ===
Sorensen returned to civilian nursing in April 1921 as matron of Rosemount Repatriation Hospital. It was reported that while she worked in the hospital, she was held in high esteem by the patients and medical staff. She remained there until March 1922, when she became matron of the Brisbane Children's Hospital. After undertaking her midwifery certificate at Queen Alexandra Hospital for Women, Hobart, Sorensen was appointed deputy general matron.

In 1928, she was appointed matron of Brisbane General Hospital, succeeding Miss E. J. Bourne. At this time, the hospital was the largest in the southern hemisphere. In her position Sorensen took control of all the hospitals that came under the Brisbane and South Coast Hospitals Board's jurisdiction. While in the Brisbane General Hospital, she appealed to volunteers to nurse patients with polio and was appointed to a professional committee to address a shortage of nurses. She remained in this post until her retirement on 31 December 1951. Upon her retirement, it was reported that she had nursed more than a million patients over her career. She was highly regarded by "senior medical men to the most junior nurse". When asked for her reflections on nursing, she remarked "I'd have it all over again if I could."

=== Honours ===
- Royal Red Cross (1st class) (1919)
- Médaille des Épidémies (1919)
- M.B.E. (1952)

== Personal life ==
Sorensen was respected as a matron for her dedication to the profession, although she was renowned and feared for her strictness. She was a member of nursing organisations including the Nurses' Advisory Sub-Committee of Queensland, and the Australian Trained Nurses' Association. She was also a founding member and fellow of The College of Nursing, Australia. She was awarded an M.B.E. for her services to nursing in 1952. In her retirement, Sorensen lived with two of her sisters in Taringa, Queensland.

Sorensen was a keen reader, an admirer of art, and a keen golfer. She was a Baptist and regularly attended Sandgate Baptist Church.

== Death and legacy ==
Sorensen had a stroke in 1956 and died on 2 January 1958 in the Repatriation Hospital, Greenslopes, Queensland. After her death, some of Sorensen's former colleagues set up the Christense Sorensen Memorial Fund to provide assistance to student nurses. In 1976, a ward for sick nurses was unveiled at Royal Brisbane and Women's Hospital named in Sorensen's honour.
