= Mary Eily de Putron =

Stained glass artist and archaeologist

- Born: Mary Eily de Putron; July 8, 1914; Dublin, Ireland
- Died: February 9, 1982 (aged 67); Guernsey, Channel Islands
- Other names: M. E. de Putron
- Known for: Archaeology and stained glass artist

Mary Eily de Putron (1914–1982) was an Irish and Guernsey stained glass artist and archaeologist who also served in the WAAF during World War II.

== Early life and education ==
Putron was born to Annie Kate Shaw and Cyril de Putron at Bushy Park, Dublin on 8 July 1914. Her parents met while her father was stationed in Dublin as a captain in the Lancashire Fusiliers. He was originally from Guernsey. de Putron was their only child. They spent the early years of their marriage in Ireland and only moved to the Channel Islands when Colonel de Putron retired from the army. de Putron was educated in Ladies' College in St Peter Port until 1931.

== Archaeology ==
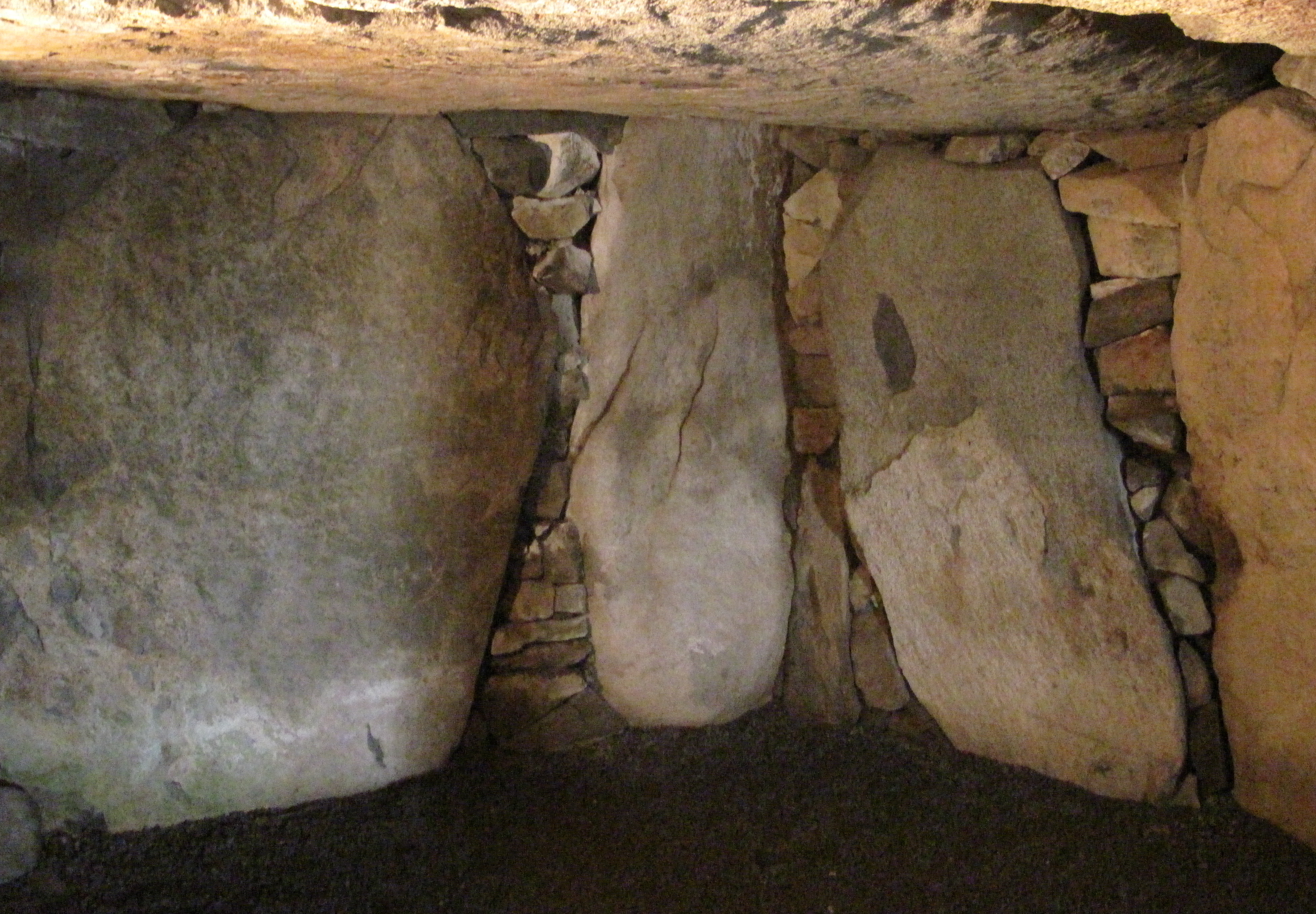
Le Déhus Dolmen

After school de Putron became an archaeological assistant and worked with Vera Collum on the Le Déhus dolmen and the Delancey Park excavations in Guernsey, Mortimer Wheeler and Tessa Verney at Verulamium, the Roman site in Hertfordshire. In 1933 she took a job as researcher at the National Museum in Dublin. She had first worked in Dublin on the Islandbridge dig where items were exposed during the building of the Irish National War Memorial Gardens there. At just 20 years old de Putron was elected member of the Archaeological Society of Great Britain and Ireland. She continued to work on digs in Ireland such as Poulawack Cairn, the stone cashel at Cahercommaun and the crannogs in Offaly, Westmeath and County Meath with Joseph Raftery on the Harvard Archaeological Expedition.

When not working on digs de Putron was illustrating artefacts at the museum, including working with the resident artist Eileen Barnes. With the Third Harvard University Archaeological Mission to Ireland coming to an end in October 1935, de Putron left to study archaeology at University College London. She graduated with a Diploma in June 1938. After that she worked for some time in England and Guernsey with Ralph Durand and Margaret Guido. She also worked closely with Dorothy Liddell and Christopher Hawkes. Liddell was unwell by then and requested that the work be completed by de Putron when she died. Despite the outbreak of war later the reports were completed and validated by later work.

== World War II ==
With the start of World War II in 1939 de Putron returned initially home and then went to England where she joined the Women's Auxiliary Air Force in the Administrative and Special Duties Branch. Starting as an Aircraftwoman 1st Class she was promoted to Flight Officer by 1943 and was mentioned in dispatches in 1945. de Putron was entitled to the 1939–1945 Star medal as well as the War Medal 1939–1945. The outbreak of war ended de Putron's career in archaeology. By the time it ended her homeland had been occupied and her father and uncle had died.

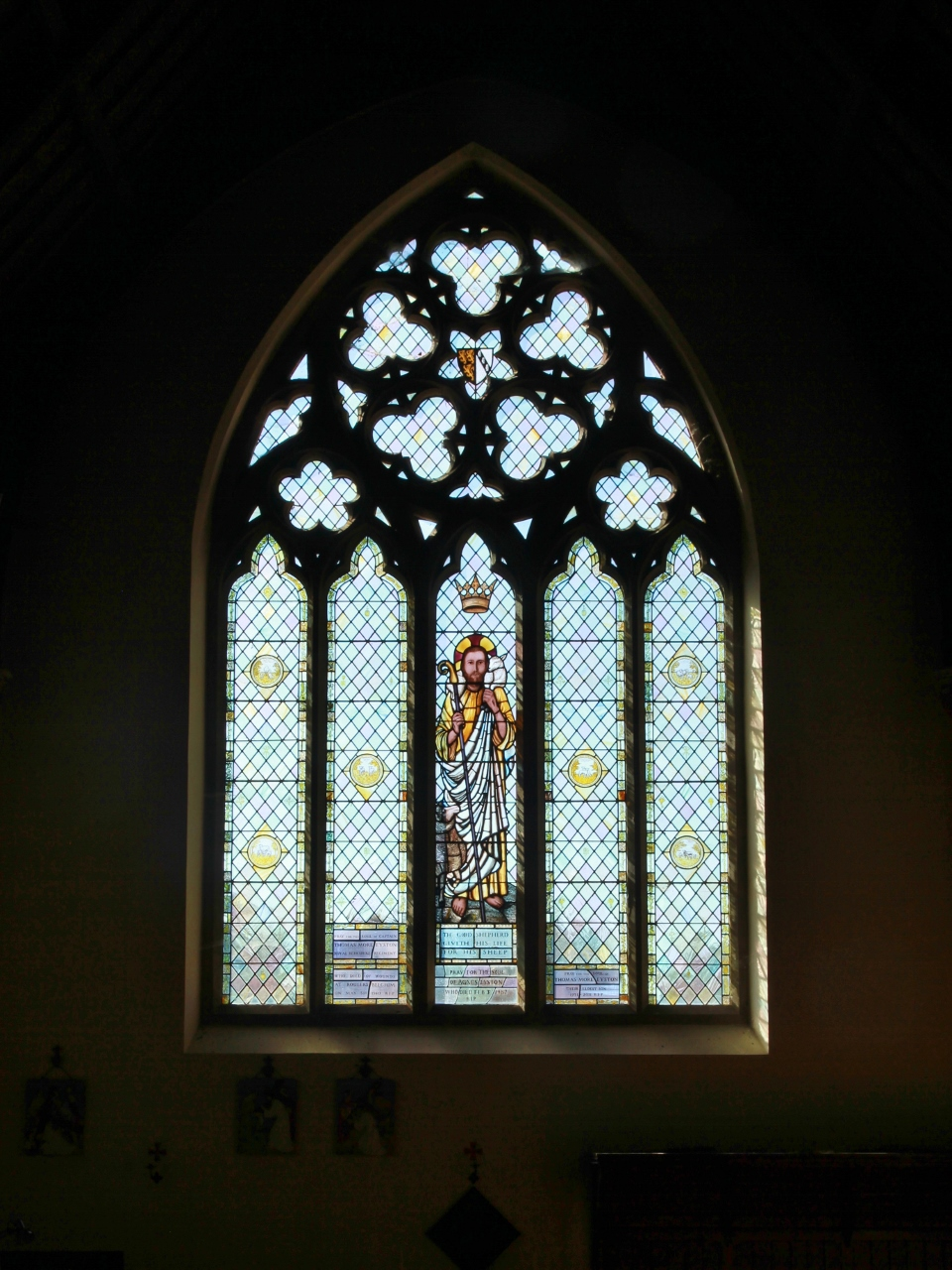
The Good Shepherd west window, St. Mary's Church, East Hendred, by Mary Eily de Putron, 1959

== Stained glass ==
During the war de Putron took to sketching in the Victoria and Albert Museum. There she met Joan Howson and the two became friends and collaborators. With Howson she worked on Westminster Abbey stained glass windows, removing and replacing some of them so that they would not be damaged during the war. Some of those not removed, like in the Chapter House, she helped restore with Howson until 1951. They also worked together on the ante-chapel of New College, Oxford. She gained attention as a result of this collaboration and as a result began designing and installing windows of her own. She began with the chapel at Bradfield College in Berkshire where she installed window badges in 1950. She did a window in St Martin's Parish Church, Guernsey and St Mary's Catholic Church, East Hendred as well as in the Parish Church at Stoke Climsland in Cornwall. She began to complete windows for churches around the country though many are in the Channel Islands. de Putron set up her studio and workshop in Fontaine Fleurie where she moved after her return to Guernsey.

de Putron became a member of La Société Guernesiaise in 1961 and was a member of the council for a period. She was a keen gardener and member of the Botanical Society of the British Isles. She was co-opted to the sub-committee of the National Trust of Guernsey due to her experience in archaeology and helping of Charles Brett and the survey of buildings in 1975. She wrote for the local journals - She published the diary of her great-uncle, the Reverend Pierre de Putron in the Review of the Guernsey Society, author of an illustrated book on archaeology in Sussex, an article on the life and work of Joan Howson in the Journal of Stained Glass and, for the Transactions of La Société Guernesiaise, the obituary of Thomas Downing Kendrick, Director of the British Museum.

== Legacy ==
de Putron died of cancer 9 February 1982 at the Princess Elizabeth Hospital in St Martins. Her windows were featured in the Christmas 1993 postage stamps issued by Guernsey. The stamps were designed by Jennifer Toombs.

Film of her as a young woman in 1932 is held by the Cinema Museum in London. Entitled "Guernsey March 21st – April 6, 1932. M.V.Thomas stays with Colonel and Mrs De Putron and Mary at Lower Bertozerie" .
