= Jennifer Toombs =

British stamp designer (1940–2018)

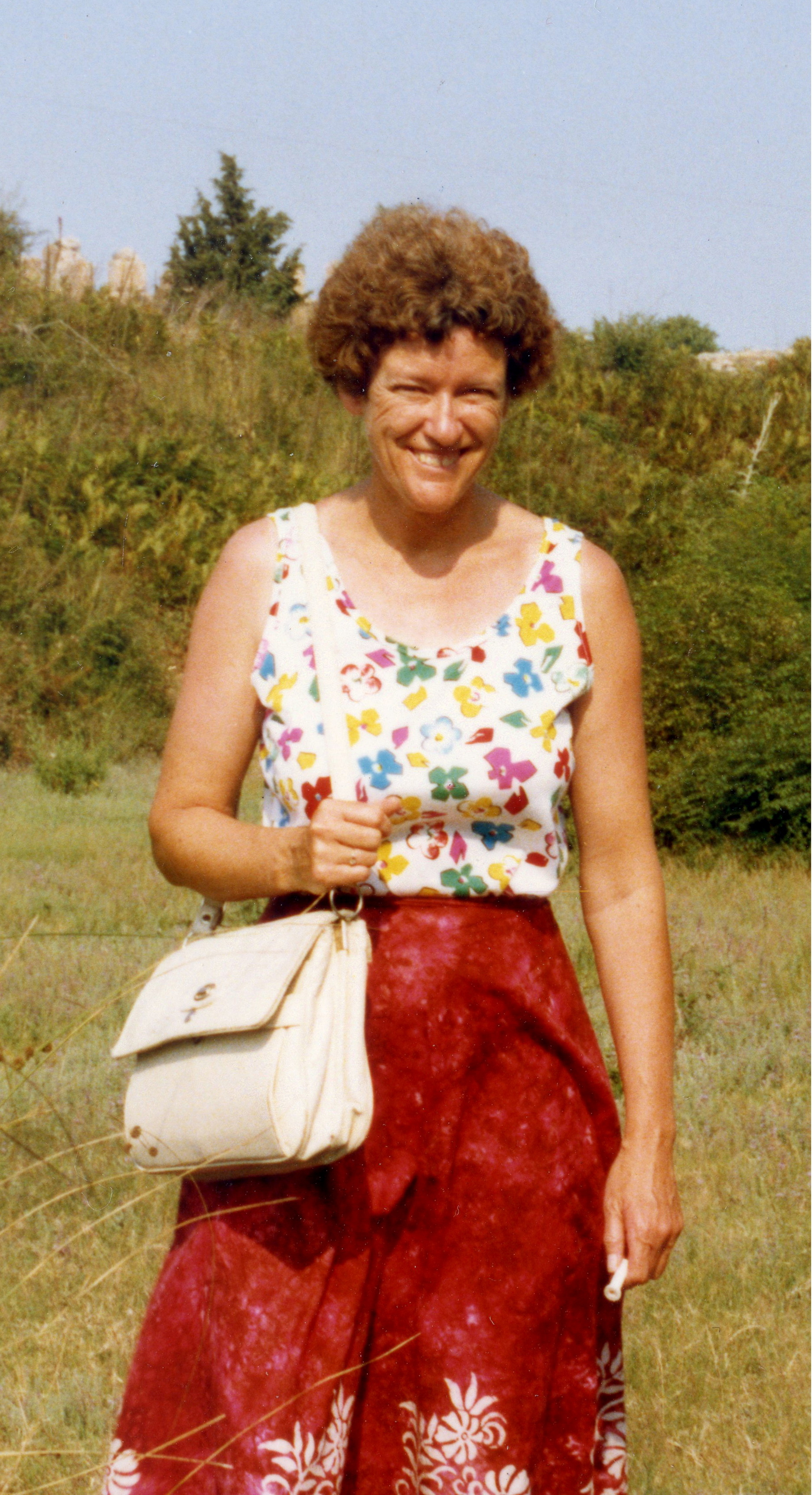
- Jennifer Toombs in 1989
- Born: 26 October 1940
- Died: April 2, 2018 (aged 77)
- Other name: Jenny
- Occupation: Stamp designer

Jennifer M. Toombs, (26 October 1940 - 2 April 2018) was a notable British graphic artist, stamp designer, and president of the Pitcairn and Norfolk Islands Society from 1987 till 2018.

== Early life and education ==
Jennifer Mary Toombs, or Jenny Toombs, was born to John and Enid Toombs, in Isleworth, West London, on the 26th October 1940. She lived most of her early years in Watford and Reading, England, UK. In the 1980's she moved to Saxmundham, so that she will be neared to Aldeburgh, and the burial place of her beloved composer and pianist Benjamin Britten. She went to Bushey Grammar School, and she afterwards attended the School of Art at Watford College of Technology, where she obtained a National Diploma in Design (NDD). She was a member of the Chartered Society of Designers (MCSD), and a Fellow of the Royal Society of Arts (FRSA).

== Stamp designer ==
Jennifer Toombs has designed stamps for at least 70 countries from the British Virgin Islands to Bahrein, from St. Kitts to Malawi, and from Ethiopia to the Bahamas. In some cases she has, also, designed the cachet for matching First Day Covers and pictorial First Day of Issue postmarks. Her work has become popular with collectors worldwide and is described as "Toombsiana".

Her career as a stamp designer started when she was 22 years of age with stamps for Lebanon, Nicaragua and Saudi Arabia (1964). After the death of Sir Winston Churchill her stamp designs, commemorating the first anniversary of the death of the statesman, were adopted for the stamps issued by 33 Commonwealth countries, each issuing a set of 4 stamps. The stamps were released on 24 January 1966 and were printed by the British printery of Harrison & Sons. After this, Crown Agents secured her skills for an omnibus series celebrating the 20th Anniversary of UNESCO, when 27 countries issued a set of 3 stamps each highlighting important aspects of UNESCO's role: Education, Science and Culture. The omnibus series was issued on 1 December 1966.

The 4 cents stamp of Virgin Islands, designed by Jennifer Toombs in 1969, and depicting a pirate ship, Jim Hawkins and Long John Silver, is part of a 4 values stamp set.

During the ensuing years, Jennifer Toombs created a steady stream of stamp designs for the Crown Agents. Her debut on the British Virgin Islands stamp scene took place in 1969: My first “real” design for the BVI was to honour Robert Louis Stevenson, and for this I chose to depict four scenes from "Treasure Island", the well-loved adventure story, she revealed in an interview published by Gibbons Stamp Monthly, in January 2017.

Giorgio Migliavacca, a stamp expert, stated in an article that Jennifer Toombs belongs to the Olympus of stamp designers and artists: from Alfred Edward Chalon, to Tommaso Aloisio Juvara, Edmund Dulac, Casimira Dabrowska, Elisabeth von Janota-Bzowski, and Czesław Słania, to name a few.

In 1978–79, Toombs submitted to the UK Post Office Stamp Design Advisory Committee stamp designs honouring four British composers, two of them in a se-tenant format with the stamp at left depicting Henry Purcell on a background featuring the composer's music that last century inspired one of Britten's most loved compositions, the Variations and Fugue on a Theme of Purcell, also known as The Young Person’s Guide to the Orchestra. Toombs designs were too sophisticated for the Committee and did not materialize in a stamp issue.

Jennifer Toombs has designed several hundreds of stamps, covers and pictorial postmarks, and has created a steady stream of stamp designs for the Crown Agents. Among them are over 110 Christmas sets and hundreds of stamp designs.

Her stamp designs, which count over 200 sets, were carefully and patiently recorded into Toombsiana Topics, compiled by Eric Waldock, who had fallen in love with Toombs' designs since her Handicrafts issue for Pitcairn Islands.

== Personal life ==
She had two sisters. Elizabeth, married and lived in Kenya, and Helen, married to a priest and lived in Bristol.

== Death ==
She died on 2 April 2018, aged 77.

== Notable issues ==
- 1964, Saudi Arabia, definitive stamps
- 1964, Lebanon, 4th Mediterranean Games
- 1965, Nicaragua, Antiques (5c to 25c + 60c)
- 1966, British Commonwealth, Winston Churchill, Omnibus series, 33 countries
- 1966, UNESCO 20th Anniversary, Omnibus series, 27 countries
- 1968, Jamaica, Human rights (3 values)
- 1968, Lesotho, Sahara Rock Paintings (7 values)
- 1969, British Virgin Islands, Robert Louis Stevenson “Treasure Island”
- 1969, Western Samoa, Robert Louis Stevenson 75th Death Anniversary
- 1969-1975, Pitcairn Islands, Definitive series (13 values)
- 1970, Ethiopia, Ancient Pottery (5 values)
- 1970, Antigua, St. Helena, Cayman Islands, British Virgin Islands, etc., Charles Dickens (4 values)
- 1970, Jersey, Battle of Flowers (4 values)
- 1971, Jersey, Wildlife Preservation (4 values)
- 1971, British Honduras, Local Hardwoods (4 values & Miniature Sheet)
- 1971, Jamaica, Tercentenary of the Post Office (6 values)
- 1972, Nicaragua, Christmas (9 values & Miniature Sheet)
- 1973, New Hebrides, Orchids (8 values)
- 1973, Saint Vincent, William Wilberforce (3 values)
- 1975, Gibraltar, 500th Birthday of Michelangelo (3 values & Booklet)
- 1976, Seychelles, Bicentenary American Revolution (9 values & Miniature Sheet)
- 1977, Silver Jubilee Queen Elizabeth II Accession to the Throne, Crown Agents Omnibus series of 24 countries
- 1978, Silver Jubilee Queen Elizabeth II Coronation, Crown Agents Omnibus series of 9 countries
- 1981, Saint Kitts, Birds Definitive series (17 values)
- 1981, Tristan da Cunha, 100th Anniversary of Rev. Edwin Dodgson's Arrival on Tristan da Cunha (3 values & Miniature Sheet & FDC)
- 1982, Vanuatu, Orchids Definitive series (14 values)
- 1987, Uganda, Birds (8 values & 2 Miniature Sheets)
- 1989, Bhutan, Indigenous Birds (12 values & 12 Miniature Sheets)
- 1990, The Gambia, African Birds, Souvenir Sheet (20 values)
- 1991, Nevis, Local Birds, Souvenir Sheet (20 values)
- 1992, Malawi, African Birds, Souvenir Sheet (20 values)
- 1993, Guernsey, Christmas stamps showing the work of Mary Eily de Putron
- 1993, Sierra Leone, Cats of the World (Souvenir Sheet 12 values & 2 Miniature Sheets)
- 2002, Jersey, Golf (5 values)
- 2003, Jersey, 50th Ann. Queen Elizabeth II Coronation (6 values & Souvenir Sheet)
- 2005, British Virgin Islands, Christmas Plants & Flowers (4 values)
- 2009, Pitcairn Islands, Charles Darwin (4 values)
