= Medal for Voluntary Military Service =

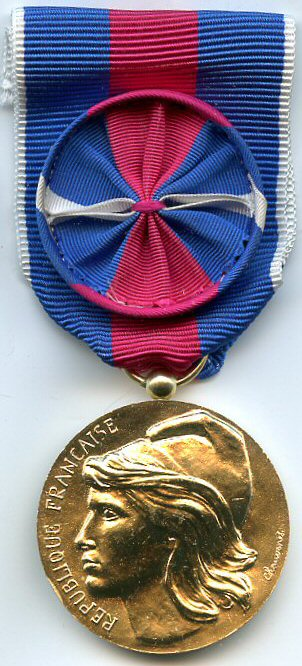
- Gold level medal for voluntary military service (obverse)
- Type: Medal with 3 Classes (bronze, silver, gold)
- Awarded for: Service in the military reserves
- Presented by: France
- Eligibility: Military personnel
- Status: No longer awarded after 1 July 2019
- Established: 13 March 1975
- Bronze Silver Gold Ribbons of the three grades of the Medal for voluntary military service

Precedence
- Next (higher): National Defence Medal
- Equivalent: Defence and Internal Security Volunteer Reservists Medal
- Next (lower): Médaille d'honneur du service de santé des armées

The Medal for Voluntary Military Service (French: "Médaille des services militaires volontaires") is a French military decoration established on 13 March 1975 by decree 75–150. It was established in three grades to recognize voluntary military service in the reserves.

During World War I, the reserves served as an important part of the defence of France. Following the end of hostilities, in order to reward their volunteerism during training periods, a decree of 13 May 1934 created the "Cross for voluntary military service" (French: "Croix des services militaires volontaires") in three grades, bronze, silver and gold. This first incarnation of a truly reserve award was rather short lived being replaced on 22 March 1957 with the "Order of military merit" (French: "Ordre du mérite militaire") at the request of the "Union Nationale des Officiers de Réserve" (English: "National Union of Reserve Officers"). This award, like many other French orders, had three grades Knight, Officer, and Commander. Unfortunately, the Order of military merit was one of sixteen ministerial awards abolished in December 1963 in favour of an all encompassing new "National Order of Merit" (French: "Ordre National du Mérite").

Between the abolition of the Order of military merit in 1963 and the creation of the Medal for voluntary military service in 1975, no award existed to adequately recognize reservists. The medal was replaced by the Defence and Internal Security Volunteer Reservists Medal on 1 July 2019.

== Award statute ==
The Medal for voluntary military service is awarded to military personnel not in the full-time regular army serving honourably part-time in information, training and improvement of reserves, recruiting, military preparedness as well as activities within special associations. It may be exceptionally awarded to military personnel of either the reserves or regular army who distinguished themselves by the exceptionally high quality of their service. For award to a member of the regular army, this service must have been carried out outside of normal working hours and for no pay. The medal may be awarded posthumously.

The award is divided into three grades, bronze, silver and gold. The award of a particular grade is calculated from the number of years of service and points earned during training and from the receipt of "Témoignages de Satisfaction" or "TS" (English: "Tokens of Satisfaction"). These "TS" can come from different levels of the chain of command and as such, are worth more or less:

- ministerial TS with special congratulations is worth 12 points;
- ministerial TS is worth 9 points;
- regional HQ TS is worth 6 points;
- Division level TS is worth 3 points.

The conditions for award of each grade of the Medal for voluntary military service are:

- Bronze: minimum four years of service in the reserves and 30 points for officers or 24 points for NCOs;
- Silver: minimum nine years of service in the reserves, having received the bronze level at least five years prior, eight TS and 66 points for officers or 60 points for NCOs;
- Gold: minimum fifteen years of service in the reserves, having received the silver level at least six years prior, twelve TS and 99 points for officers or 90 points for NCOs.

Decree 96-390 of 10 May 1996 added foreign reservists as potential recipients of any of the three grades of the medal, at the sole discretion of the minister of defence, for having rendered particularly honourable services to the defence of France or its armed forces.

== Award description ==
The Medal for voluntary military service is a 32mm in diameter circular medal struck from bronze, it is silvered for the silver grade or gilt for the gold grade. Its obverse bears the left profile of the effigy of the Republic wearing a Phrygian cap with the relief semi circular inscription "RÉPUBLIQUE FRANÇAISE" (English: "French Republic") along the left circumference. The reverse bears the relief image of a vertical sword superimposed over two crossed naval anchors themselves superimposed over air force wings, at the bottom along the medal circumference, the relief inscription "SERVICES MILITAIRES VOLONTAIRES" (English: "Voluntary Military Services").

The medal hangs from a ribbon passing through a suspension ring itself passing through a ball shaped suspension loop at the top of the medal. The 37mm wide silk moiré ribbon differs according to the grade of the award. The ribbon of the bronze grade award is blue with an 11 mm central red stripe; the silver grade ribbon only differs from the bronze grade in the addition of white 2mm edge stripes; a rosette in the colours of the silver grade ribbon is added for the gold grade award.

Bronze grade obverse & ribbon	Silver grade obverse & ribbon	Gold grade obverse & ribbon	Gold grade common reverse

== Notable recipients (partial list) ==
- General Gérard Lecointe
- Colonel Paul Arnault
- Colonel Adrien Henry
- Colonel Fred Moore
- Lieutenant colonel Jean the Marquis of de Geoffre de Chabrignac
- Commander Éric Dumont
- Commander Gérard Simon
- Police prefect Pierre Mutz
- Major André Emlinger
- Major Didier Froehly
- Captain René-Georges Weill
- Jean Astier de Villatte
- Bernard Plasait
- Pascal-Raphaël Ambrogi
- Pierre Favre
- Olivier de Rohan-Chabot
- Pascal Chaigneau
- Amaury de Saint-Quentin
- Jacques Guggenheim
- Hugues Hourdin
- Jean-Marie Cambacérès
- Louis Étienne Albrand

== See also ==
- Military reserve force
- French Armed Forces
