= Déhus Dolmen =

Déhus Dolmen, Channel Islands

Coordinates: 49.497222°N 2.506389°W

Le Déhus Dolmen
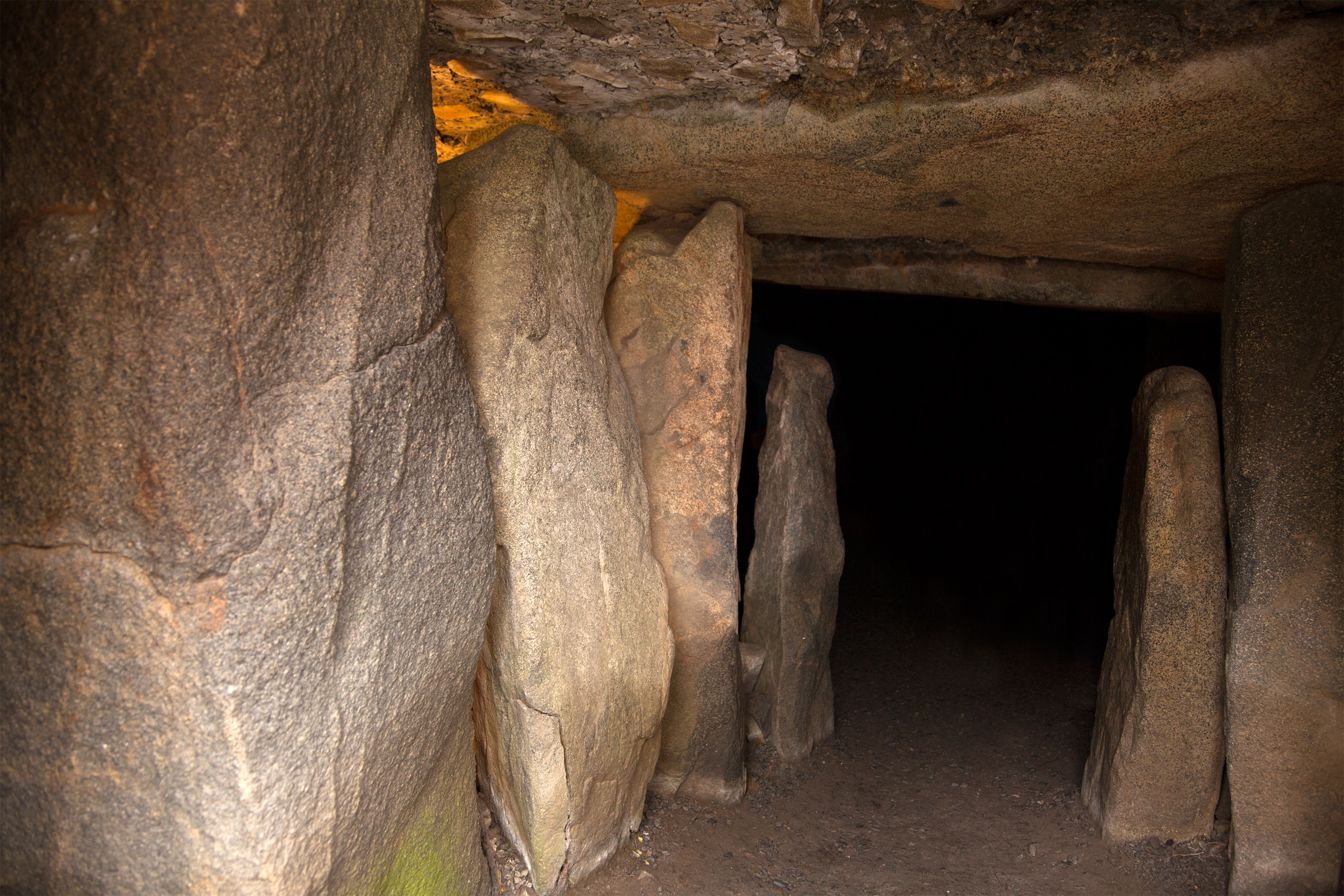
- Interactive map of Le Déhus Dolmen
- Type: Dolmen
- Periods: Neolithic
- Location: Channel Islands

Site notes
- Excavation dates: 1837, 1898, 1915, 1932
- Archaeologists: Frederick Corbin Lukis, Rev. Lee, Lieutenant Colonel T. W. M. de Guérin, Vera Collum

The Déhus dolmen is a Neolithic dolmen located in the parish of Clos du Valle on the island of Guernsey.

== History ==
The name Déhus probably comes from the old Norse Dys (or Dysse) meaning dolmen. The monument is mentioned in 1753 as the "altar of the Dehus". In 1775 the site was bought by John de Havilland to protect it from further destruction. Joshua Gosselin mentions it in his 1813 description of the "Druid Temple" and calls it "The Stone of the Déhus".

The dolmen was excavated between 1837 and 1848 by the archaeologist Frederick Corbin Lukis. New excavations were carried out in 1898 by Rev. Lee, in 1915 by Lieutenant Colonel T. W. M. de Guérin and in 1932 by Vera Collum. The present appearance of the building dates from the restoration of 1932. Mary Eily de Putron worked on the dolmen during this time.

== Description ==
It is a corridor dolmen delimited by about thirty orthostats. It is buried under a circular tumulus surrounded by a wall of facing consisting of an alternation of large blocks of standing stone and stones laid flat. The entrance opens to the northeast, towards the coast. It is enhanced by a trilith. Three stones were found in situ, the lintel was added and replaced by the archaeologist GE Lee in 1898. The corridor, oriented east / west, is 3 m long and 1 m wide. It is covered with four slabs of cover. It serves several side rooms, now not visible, and leads to a terminal room. The number and layout of these secondary chambers is uncertain. Lukis mentions only four rooms (numbered from A to D). The fifth bedroom could be the result of an incorrect restoration.

=== Terminal Chamber ===
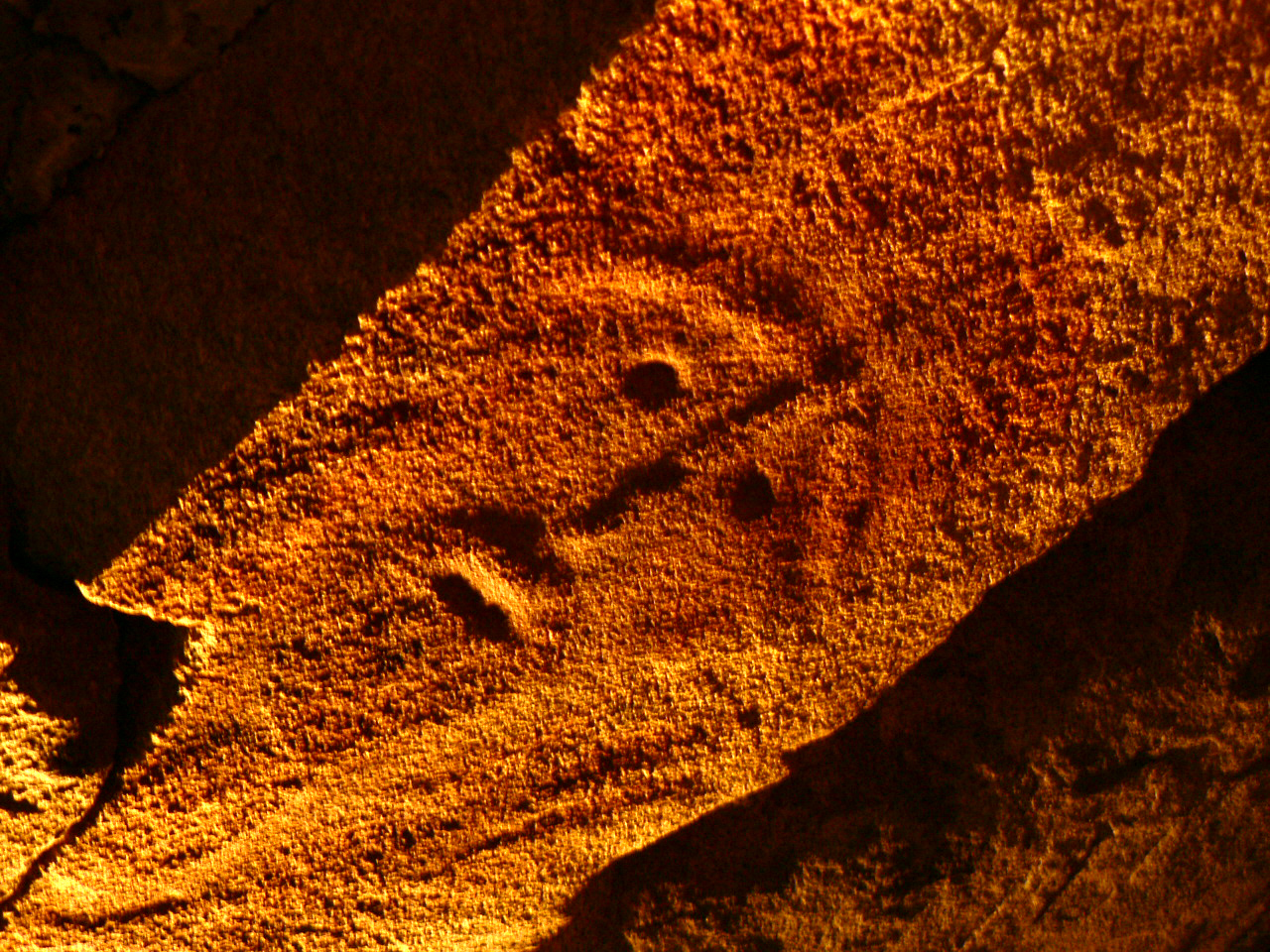
Anthropomorphic figure

The terminal chamber, "bottle-shaped" typical of some megalithic monuments of Normandy ) and the Channel Islands, is relatively spacious. It is about 6 meters long and 3.50 meters wide. A central pillar supports the ceiling consisting of several slabs, one of which is engraved with an anthropomorphic figure called "the guardian of the tomb." The ceiling height is insufficient to stand up, you must lie on your back to contemplate. It is composed of a human face and hands arranged on the narrow edge of the stone, the fingers seeming to come out from beneath the stone. The soil contained many shells of limpets as well as cremated remains of bones. It is in the oldest layer of the soil, made of yellowish clay, that human skeletons, various bones, cut stones, bone tools and fragments of pottery were discovered.

=== Side Room A ===
Side Room A measures 1.60m by 1.65m with a ceiling height of 1.45m. Lukis discovered human bones, ceramic shards (including a fragment of the base of a decorated terracotta cup) and a polished serpentine ax.

=== Side Room B ===
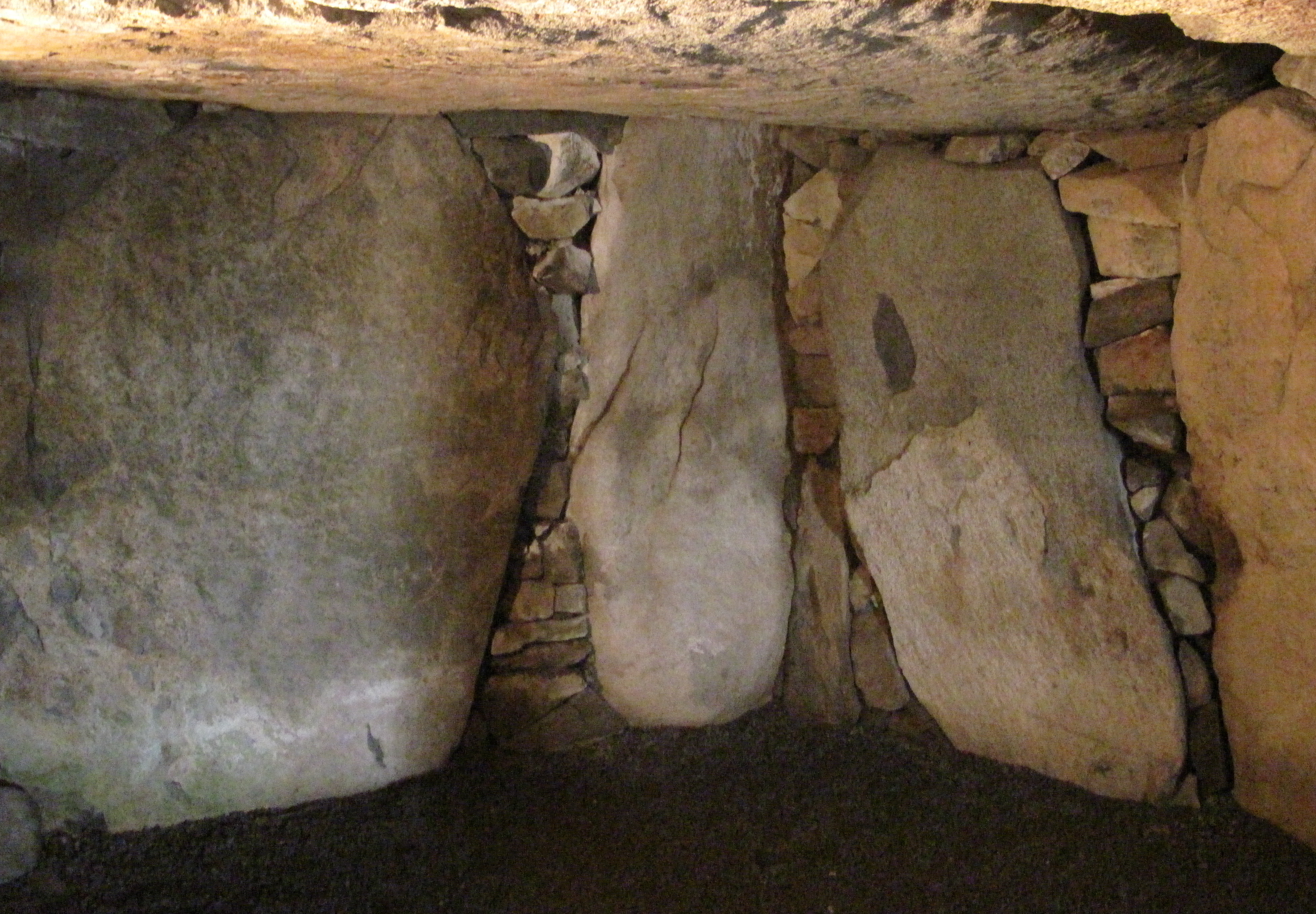
Guernsey, Dehus Dolmen

Side Room B is a small room of 1.07m at the widest whose narrowness does not allow to sneak inside. The initial ceiling height was 1.27m. Most of the north wall was completed by dry masonry. Under ground, at a depth of 0.15m, Lukis discovered two skulls belonging to two complete skeletons facing east and west with knees together in different directions. No archaeological material was discovered.

=== Side Room C ===
Side Room C is the largest of the side rooms, discovered by Lukis in 1847. Of oval shape, its diameter is between 1.47m and 1.68m and the ceiling height is 1.42m. The excavation revealed a layer of pebbles mixed with many shells of limpets and three groups of human bones arranged on flat slabs. The group to the south was a child's bones.

=== Side Room D ===
Side Room D was searched by Lukis in 1847. According to Lukis, it had several periods of use. The soil consisted of two distinct levels of deposits: a first level composed of human bones resting on a bed of slabs and a second level, approximately 0.30 m below, composed of a second bed of slabs covered with bones. In the south-east corner and west of the room, Lukis discovered skeletons in a squatting position. On the north side, a bowl-shaped pottery rested on three triangular stones. This bowl is the only ceramic discovered in the room.
