= Suzanne Jannin =

French dentist, resistance fighter and air force pilot (1912–1982)

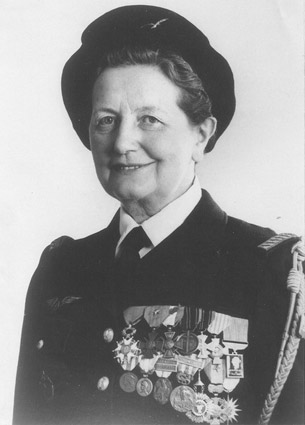
Highly decorated Suzanne Jannin

Suzanne Henriette Jannin, also Suzanne Henriette Delvoye, (1912–1982) was a French dentist, a resistance fighter in World War II, and an air force pilot in Indochina. After receiving her military pilot's licence in 1948, she gave up dentistry to devote herself to aviation. From 1951, she undertook French Air Force reconnaissance missions in the Far East until she returned to France in 1954. In 1957, she once again took up dentistry opening a practice in Paris.

== Early life ==
Born in Belleville-sur-Meuse on 28 July 1912, Suzanne Henriette Jannin studied dentistry at Nancy, receiving her diploma in 1939. In May 1939, she began to train as a pilot at Tomblaine on a Potez 43.

== French resistance and World War II ==
During German occupation, she became an active participant in the French resistance. As a member of the Meuse department's F.F.I., Region C, under Colonel Grandval, she lodged British and American parachutists, escorting them from Verdun to the Swiss border. She also provided medical services, transmitted news reports, and transported documents, weapons and munitions.

On 1 September 1944, she became a lieutenant and on 1 January 1944 she joined the army's Women's Auxiliary Administration Corps. Rather than take on administrative duties, she found a 4-by-4 vehicle which enabled to ferry French prisoners back from Germany. Between 6 May and 15 August 1945, on her own initiative, she led four convoys of 38 vehicles, repatriating a total of 650 prisoners.

== Aviation and French Air Force ==
A keen aviation enthusiast, she became president of the Verdun Air Club. After giving up her dental practice in Verdun, she moved to Paris where she could devote all her time to aeronautics. In 1948, she received her military pilot's licence followed by additional training courses at Saint-Yan and at Challes-les-Eaux.

In April 1951, she joined the Far Eastern Women's Auxiliary Administration Corps (Corps des auxiliaires féminines d’administration: Cafaeol) as a dental captain based in Tonkin, French Indochina. In 1952, General Lionel-Max Chassin encouraged her to join the Air Force. In order to do so, she had to give up her officer's grade and become a simple corporal. On 6 April 1953, she was sent to join the 52nd squadron at Tan-Son-Nhut near Saigon where she piloted Morane Criquets. She was the second woman to become a pilot in the Air Force and the first in Indochina. She flew day and night, both on reconnaissance, guidance and rescue missions, clocking up 290 flights, of which 86 were war missions. After being sent to Laos, she gave up aviation for a time to provide dental services to the troops stationed there. In her own words, Jannin explained: "I always tried to help my country, to assume responsibility and that's why I went to Indochina."

== Later life and commemoration ==
After General Chassin's departure, it was difficult for her to continue her missions. She returned to France in 1954, where she continued to serve as an Air Force dentist until 1957, stationed first in Saclay and then in Châtillon-sous-Bagneux. She then re-established her dental practice in Paris. On 27 April 1961, she married Gustave Delvoye in Paris.

Suzanne Jannin died in 1982. Her funeral was held on 10 July 1982 at Mons-en-Barœul, a suburb of Lille.

In September 2019, a plaque in memory of "Suzanne Jannin Pilote en Indochine" was unveiled by Le Souvenir Français at Belleville-sur-Meuse, her birthplace. The square on which the plaque stands was ceremoniously named "Square Suzanne Jannin" by the mayor, Yves Peltier.

== Awards ==
Jannin received the following awards:

- Knight of the Legion of Honour
- Officer of the National Order of Merit
- Croix de Guerre 1939–1945 (France)
- Croix de guerre des théâtres d'opérations extérieures
- Resistance Medal
- Aeronautical Medal
- Colonial Medal for Indochina
- Military Health Service honour medal
- Grande medaille d'or de l'Aéroclub de France
