= Defence and Internal Security Volunteer Reservists Medal =

French civil and military service medal

Defence and Internal Security Volunteer Reservists Medal Médaille des réservistes volontaires de défense et de sécurité intérieure
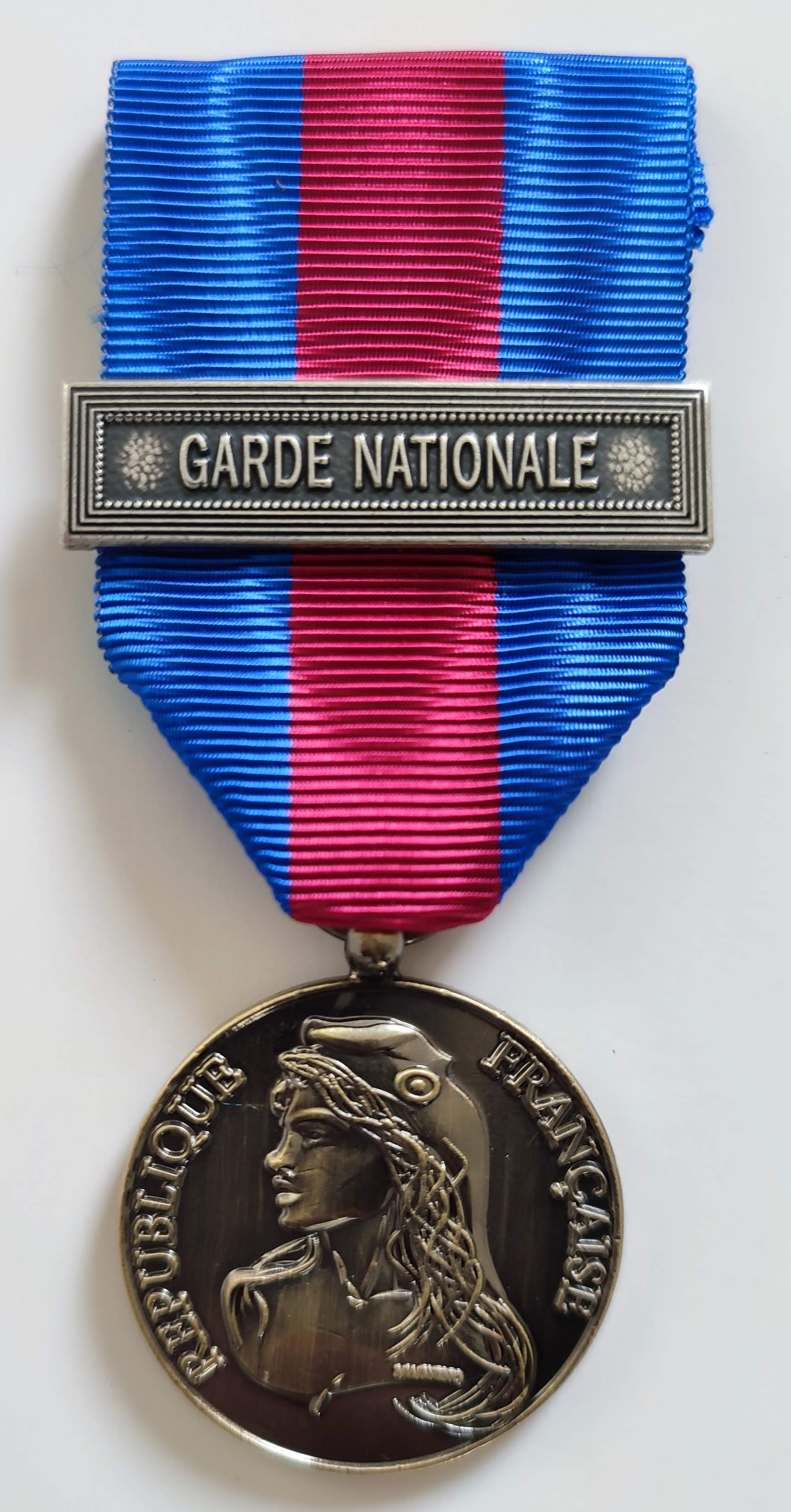
- Type: Medal with 3 Classes (bronze, silver, gold)
- Presented by: France
- Eligibility: Members of the military and civilian reserves
- Established: 1 July 2019
- Bronze Silver Gold Ribbons of the three grades of the medal

Precedence
- Next (higher): National Defence Medal
- Equivalent: Medal for voluntary military service
- Next (lower): Honour medals of the various ministerial departments

The Defence and Internal Security Volunteer Reservists Medal (French: Médaille des réservistes volontaires de défense et de sécurité intérieure) is a civil and military service medal of France. Established on 1 July 2019, it replaces the Medal for voluntary military service.

== Establishment ==
Created by Decree No. 2019-688 of 1 July 2019, the Defence and Internal Security Volunteer Reservists Medal is awarded for loyalty and commitment to service performed in the military operational reserve, National Police reserve, the Defense and security citizen reserve, and the National Police citizen reserve. The medal may also be awarded to people working for the benefit of reservists or to those who promote the mission of the volunteer reservists.

This medal was created to replace the Medal for voluntary military service. Recipients of the Medal for voluntary military service may continue to wear it. Individuals may not wear it if they have been awarded the Defence and Internal Security Volunteer Reservists Medal in a higher grade as the medals are seen as being the same.

== Award criteria ==
The medal is awarded in three different grades bronze, silver, and gold. Each grade has different criteria:

- Bronze is awarded for three years of qualifying reserve service or after 37 days of active service
- Silver is awarded for 10 years of qualifying reserve service or after 185 days of active service
- Gold is awarded for 15 years of qualifying reserve service or after 370 days of active service

== Appearance ==
The Defence and Internal Security Volunteer Reservists Medal is round and 32 mm (1.3 in) in diameter. It is made of bronze, silver, or gold coloured metal, depending on the grade. The obverse shows a profile of Marianne, the embodiment of the French Republic with the words RÉPUBLIQUE FRANÇAISE around the edge. The reverse bears the inscription RÉSERVISTE VOLONTAIRE DE DÉFENSE ET DE SÉCURITÉ INTÉRIEURE. It is suspended from a 37 mm (1.5 in) wide ribbon of ultramarine blue, with a dark red central stripe, one third the ribbon's width. For silver medals, the ribbon is edged in white. For gold medals, the ribbon is edged in yellow.

Clasps

The medal is awarded with the following clasps:

- Garde Nationale, for operational reservists of the military and National police, and those working for the benefit of the reserves.
- Réserve citoyenne, for the citizen reservists.
- Partenaire de la garde nationale, for those who have promoted engagement and the accomplishment of volunteer reservists mission (on gold medals only).

== See also ==
- Ribbons of the French military and civil awards
- French Armed Forces
