= Military Health Service honour medal =

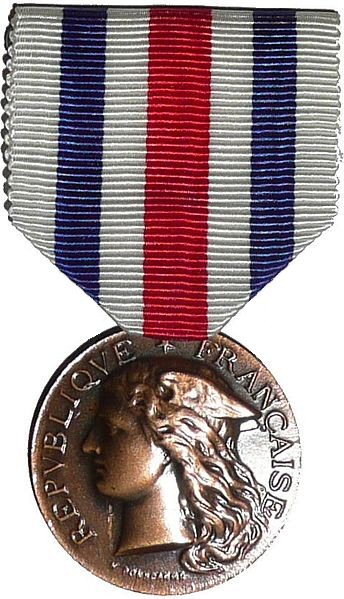
- Military Health Service honour medal (obverse)
- Type: Medal with four classes
- Awarded for: Support to the Health Service of the Armed Forces
- Presented by: France
- Eligibility: Military
- First award: 30 August 1962
- Gold Vermeil Silver Bronze Ribbon of the Military Health Service honour medal

Precedence
- Next (higher): Medal for voluntary military service
- Next (lower): Commemorative medal for voluntary service in Free France

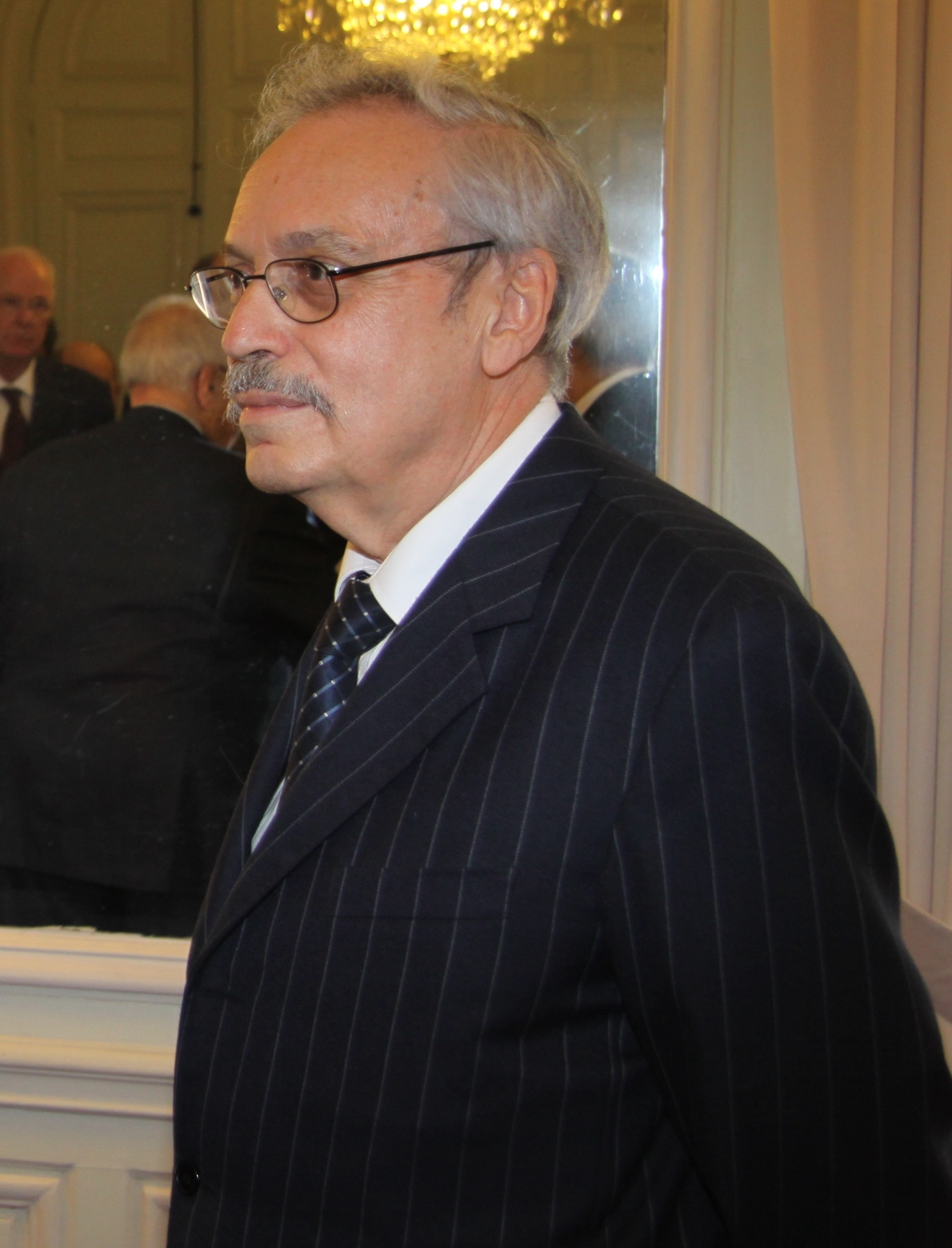
General, Doctor and Professor Jean Murat, a recipient of the Military Health Service honour medal

The Military Health Service honour medal (French: "Médaille d'honneur du service de santé des armées") is a French decoration created 30 August 1962. The medal recognizes individuals who have contributed or lent their support to the French Defence Health service and were particularly marked by their services or their dedication. It is presented in four different levels: gold, vermeil, silver, and bronze. It may be awarded to members of the military as well as civilians.

== History ==
The Military Health Service honour medal replaces six obsolete awards:

1. Medal of health services of the Army (1931) Médaille des services de santé des armées de Terre
2. Medal of health services of the Navy (1947) Médaille des services de santé de la Marine nationale
3. Medal of health services of the Air (1948) Médaille des services de santé de l'Air
4. Medal of Epidemics of the Ministry of War (1892) Médaille des Epidémies du ministère de la Guerre
5. Medal of Epidemics of the Ministry of the Navy (1909) Médaille des Epidémies du ministère de la Marine
6. Medal of Epidemics of the Ministry of France Overseas (1927) Médaille des Epidémies du ministère de la France d'outre-mer

The decree of 28 June 1979 allows the award of this distinction posthumously.

== Eligibility ==
The four levels are awarded under the following conditions:

- Bronze Medal for 10 years service;
- Silver Medal for 15 years of service and the Bronze Medal
- Vermeil Medal for 20 years of service and the Silver Medal;
- Gold Medal which is awarded only in exceptional cases.

On the occasion of exceptional circumstances, especially during epidemic periods, nominations could be made for people that do not meet the length of service conditions. No person may be proposed for the grant of a medal if he is already the holder of that of the lower level. However, members of the Order of the Legion of Honor may be directly awarded the silver or vermeil grades. The recipient receives a certificate noting that it has been awarded for services rendered or the dedication he has shown. The Médaille d'honneur du service de santé des armées is awarded, except in exceptional cases, twice a year, on 1 January and 14 July. Applications and proposals to the central management of the health service of the Armed Forces, for transmission to the office of Minister of Defense, Office of Decorations.

== Notable recipients (partial list) ==
- Surgeon General Valérie André
- Lieutenant-colonel Léo Vidou
- Surgeon General Raoul Chavialle
- Doctor Léon Lapeyssonnie
- Pilot nurse Jacqueline Domergue
- General, Doctor and Professor Jean Murat
- Suzanne Jannin, aviator and dentist
- Christense Sorensen, Australian army nurse and matron

== See also ==
- Ribbons of the French military and civil awards
- Orders, decorations, and medals of France
- Phaleristics
- French Defence Health Service
