= Jane Harriett Walker =

Medical doctor (1859–1938)

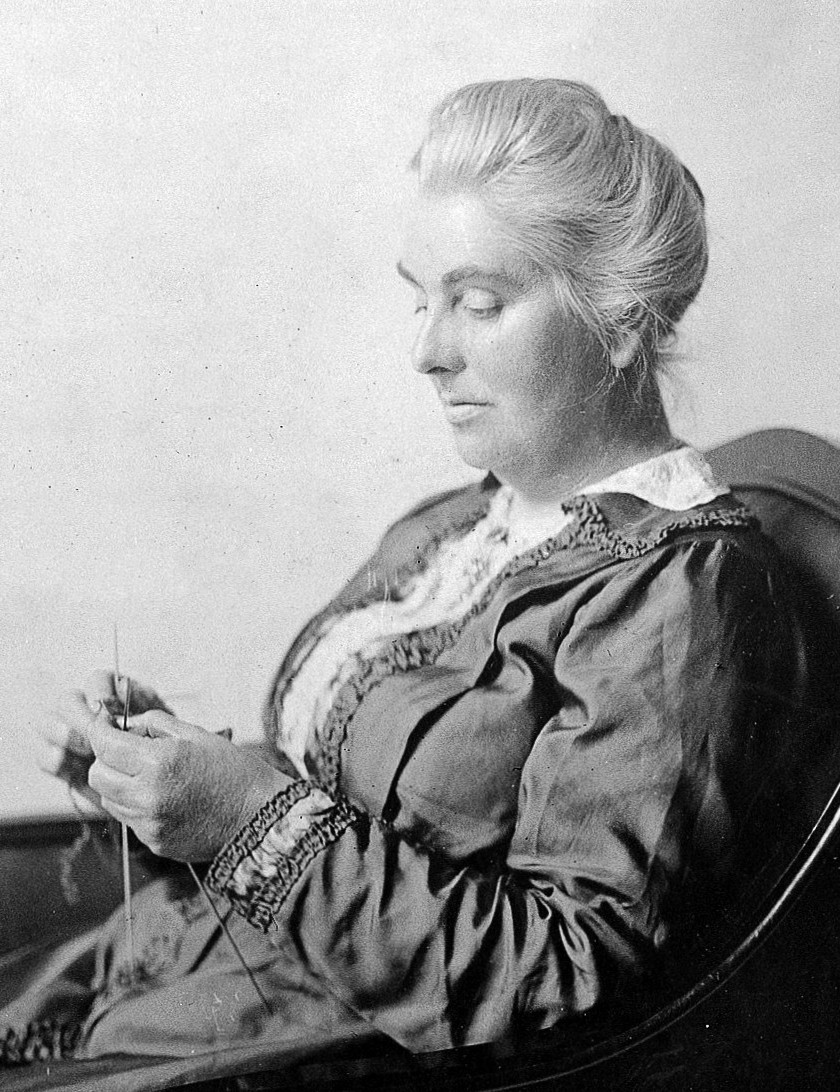
- Born: 24 October 1859; Dewsbury
- Died: 7 November 1938 (aged 79); Harley Street

Jane Harriett Walker CH (24 October 1859 – 7 November 1938) was an English medical doctor who first implemented the open-air method of treating tuberculosis in England. She was appointed a Member of the Order of the Companions of Honour in 1931.

== Life ==
Walker was born at Dewsbury in Yorkshire, one of eight children of a wool merchant. She was educated in Southport and at the Yorkshire College of Science. Determined to become a doctor, she studied at the London School of Medicine for Women in 1880 and qualified as a Licentiate of the Royal College of Physicians of Ireland in 1884.

She was the 45th woman to be included on the General Medical Register: the first was Elizabeth Blackwell in 1859. She established a private medical practice on Harley Street in London. She was interested in treating women and children. She became an outpatients physician at the New Hospital for Women in 1888, and joined the hospital's medical staff in 1895.

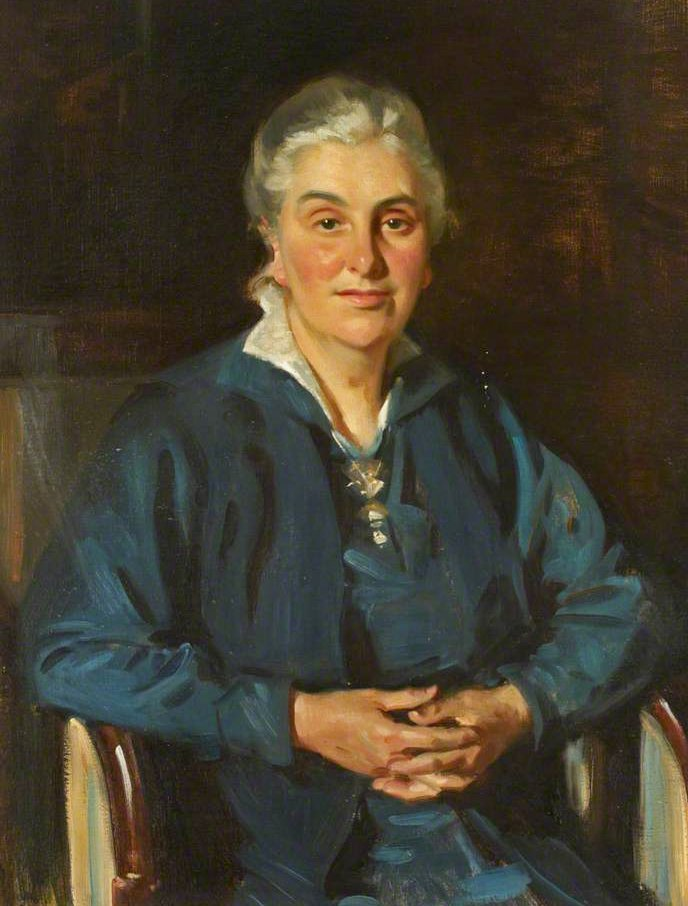
Jane Harriett Walker by Wilfrid de Glehn

Walker developed an interest in the treatment of tuberculosis, and travelled to Germany in 1888 to visit Otto Walther's sanatorium in Nordrach, where he was using an open-air method of treatment. Impressed, Walker introduced the method into the UK, at a time when many doctors favoured keeping tubercular patients in a warm stuffy environment. German bacteriologist Robert Koch had discovered the tubercle bacillus in 1882, but the best treatment was not yet clear.

In July 1892, she opened a small sanatorium at a cottage in Downham Market in Norfolk, with six beds, using Walther's method of fresh air and good nutrition. She expanded to a second sanatorium at a house in the nearby village of Denver in 1898, with ten beds. In 1901, she opened the East Anglian Sanatorium at Nayland in Suffolk, initially with 30 beds. All of these ventures only accepted private patients, but the Nayland Sanatorium opened a wing for patients from local authority patients in 1904. A separate sanatorium for children followed later. Her assistant and successor at the sanatoriums was Eleanor Soltau.

Walker was also a founder member and first president of the Medical Women's Federation (MWF) in 1917, and the President 1917-1920 - one of the first women to join the council of the Royal Society of Medicine. She was one of the founders of Godstowe, a preparatory school for girls in High Wycombe, and a magistrate. She received an honorary doctorate from the University of Leeds.

She never married. She died from a coronary thrombosis at her home on Harley Street and was buried in at Wiston, Suffolk.
