= Eleanor Soltau =

English doctor (1877–1962)

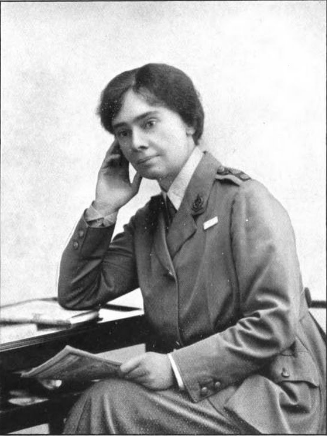
- Soltau during her First World War service
- Born: 1877; Romford, Essex
- Died: 1962 (aged 84–85); Bushey, Hertfordshire
- Occupation: Doctor
- Honours: Order of St. Sava, 3rd class Order of the Red Cross (Serbia)

Eleanor Soltau (1877–1962) was an English doctor who led the first unit of the Scottish Women's Hospitals for Foreign Service in Serbia.

== Early life ==
Soltau was born in Romford, Essex, in late 1877. Her parents were George Soltau (d. c. 1896), a nonconformist minister of Barnstaple, and his wife, Grace Elizabeth Soltau, suffragist and first president of the Tasmanian Woman's Christian Temperance Union, daughter of A. J. Tapson MB, London. There were nine children in all, born between 1876 and 1890.

In the 1880s the family moved to Launceston, Tasmania, where Eleanor's father took charge of a mission church and in 1887 her mother set up the pioneering Hope Cottage, a refuge and lying-in home for single mothers. Soltau attended Launceston Ladies' College and was successful in the matriculation examination for Melbourne University in 1893.

== Medical career ==
Soltau qualified as a doctor at the London School of Medicine for Women. Then at Ilford, she passed her final examination in February 1902, before working in a hospital in India.

Soltau is known for her leadership of a hospital unit in Serbia during the First World War, but the bulk of her career was spent in Stoke-by-Nayland in Suffolk, where for 25 years she worked alongside Jane Walker at the special tuberculosis hospital there founded by Walker. Walker was the medical superintendent and Soltau, the assistant medical superintendent. Soltau succeeded Walker on the latter's death in 1938.

At Nayland there were three separate sanatoriums in all: the East Anglian Sanatorium (for private patients only, opened 1901), the Maltings Farm Sanatorium (opened 1904, for poor patients; around the time of the First World War and after it the male patients were mostly ex-servicemen) and the East Anglian Children's Sanatorium (established between 1912 and 1916, for children from 3 to 16 years of age). Soltau recalled that many newly qualified medical women gained their first experience at the sanatoriums.

Soltau also worked at the Royal Free Hospital in London at some point before the First World War. After the war, her mother lived with her in her mother's later years.

=== Artificial pneumothorax ===
Walker and Soltau published on treatment by artificial pneumothorax, a form of lung collapse therapy, in the BMJ in 1913. The following February, at a meeting of the Association of Registered Medical Women, Soltau showed how two patients with advanced phthisis (tuberculosis), a woman and a man, had been treated effectively by artificial pneumothorax at Maltings Farm Sanatorium.

An advert for the three Nayland sanatoriums in the new Postgraduate Medical Journal in 1926 offered "treatment of Pulmonary And Other Forms Of Tuberculosis. Special Treatment by Artificial Pneumothorax (X-Ray Controlled). Electric Lighting throughout. Training given in Poultry Farming, Gardening and various Handicrafts. Medical Supt., Dr. Jane Walker. Assistant Medical Supt., Dr. Eleanor Soltau, and other Medical Officers."

Soltau was in charge of young tuberculous cases at the sanatorium and commented on treatment by artificial pneumothorax in children in her care in the British Journal of Tuberculosis. In 1934 she reported in the BMJ on 46 cases of children who had pulmonary tuberculosis treated by artificial pneumothorax at Nayland, dating back to 1912.

== First World War service ==
Soltau was among those who applied to help the war effort under the auspices of the Scottish Women's Hospitals for Foreign Service, whose first unit left for France in November 1914. Soltau led the second unit, which left for Serbia in the following January.

When the Austrians retreated from Serbia in late 1914 they had left behind "filthy hospitals crowded with wounded, Austrian and Serb alike. The whole land has been spoken of as one vast hospital." The resulting outbreak of typhus "flowed over Serbia like a flood ... more than a quarter of the Serbian doctors died, and two-thirds of the remainder had the disease." This was the context in which Soltau's unit began work in Kragujevac on 5 January 1915. It took over a school "where the sick and wounded were lying on mattresses on the floors, and later on took over five inns in the town where slightly wounded men were dealt with". Soltau soon had command of three hospitals. Common Cause, organ of the National Union of Women's Suffrage Societies, wrote in May 1916: "To Dr. Soltau's everlasting credit, she took over, with her small staff and, for such an increase of work, her inadequate equipment, No. 6 Reserve Hospital for typhus cases and No. 7 Reserve Hospital for ordinary medical cases, in addition to her surgical hospital, which was full."

On 23 January 1915 Soltau wired the Hospitals committee in Edinburgh: "Dire necessity for fever nurses. Can you send me ten or more overland? ... Equipment, mattresses, covers, blankets, linen, milk, typhol, carbolic, tow, castor-oil." She also gave details of her plans to open a special typhus hospital in Kragujevac. As well as victims of disease the unit had to deal with injured men from Valjevo who arrived "in a row of bullock-carts" one morning. "Every one was suffering from gangrenous wounds. The work was overwhelming." Soltau reported: "The newly arrived doctors and nurses, inured to all manner of human suffering and more or less prepared for working under bad conditions, were struck dumb by the horror of it all."

Reinforcements and equipment arrived, and for "three long months those women worked there, facing the hard work and the long strain with indomitable spirit. There were three deaths among the Unit, young lives given in a great cause, and nine cases of illness, and still the effort never relaxed. ... It is a strange, dark, gruesome time to look back on; but one marked by many brave deeds and much unrecorded heroism." The Scottish nurse Louisa Jordan was one of those who died, in March 1915. Soltau herself fell ill with diphtheria in April and was invalided home. Her replacement was Dr Elsie Inglis.

On 1 July 1915 Soltau gave a talk in Edinburgh hosted by the National Union of Women's Suffrage Societies entitled "The Work of the Scottish Women's Hospitals in Serbia." About 50 women attended, including Miss A. Hunter (wearing the Serbian Red Cross Order and the Working Hospitals Order), Lucy Smith and Florence Macleod, who had all looked after the wounded in the Scottish Hospital in Serbia. Soltau wore the 3rd Class Order of St Sava and the Serbian Red Cross Order. In February 1918 King George V granted Soltau "unrestricted permission" to wear the St Sava insignia, which had been "conferred upon her by the King of Serbia in recognition of her services to the Serbian sick and wounded" during the typhus epidemic.

On 17 November 1917 Soltau was appointed medical controller in the QMAAC.

== Later life ==
Soltau moved to London and lived at de Vere Gardens, Kensington. She died on 30 December 1962 at Arranmore, Bushey, Hertfordshire. She is reported to have been buried next to Jane Walker in the graveyard at Wissington church.
