= Listed buildings in Nayland-with-Wissington =

Civil Parish in Suffolk, England

Nayland-with-Wissington is a village and civil parish in the Babergh District of Suffolk, England. It contains 127 listed buildings that are recorded in the National Heritage List for England. Of these three are grade I, seven are grade II* and 117 are grade II.

This list is based on the information retrieved online from Historic England.

== Key ==
Grade	Criteria
I	Buildings that are of exceptional interest
II*	Particularly important buildings of more than special interest
II	Buildings that are of special interest

== Listing ==
Name	Grade	Location	Type	Completed (Note: The date given is the date used by Historic England as significant for the initial building or that of an important part in the structure's description.)	Date designated	Grid ref. (Note: The grid reference is based on the British national grid reference system, sometimes known as OSGB36, used by the Ordnance Survey.) Geo-coordinates	Notes	Entry number (Note: The "List Entry Number" is a unique number assigned to each listed building and scheduled monument by Historic England.)	Image	Wikidata
Boiler House and Laundry North of Jane Walker Hospital	II				10 March 1992	TL9516534357; 51°58′24″N 0°50′24″E		1233724	Upload Photo	Q26527175
Chapel Adjoining North West of Jane Walker Hospital	II				10 March 1992	TL9514234320; 51°58′23″N 0°50′23″E		1351946	Upload Photo	Q26635008
Church of St Mary Wiston	I		church building		23 March 1961	TL9546033265; 51°57′49″N 0°50′37″E		1351854	Church of St Mary Wiston More images	Q17542569
Guinea Wiggs	II				20 May 1999	TL9416434981; 51°58′46″N 0°49′33″E		1387263	Upload Photo	Q26666922
Jane Walker Hospital	II				10 March 1992	TL9516334310; 51°58′23″N 0°50′24″E		1233618	Upload Photo	Q26527073
2, Bear Street	II	2, Bear Street			9 February 1978	TL9746934379; 51°58′22″N 0°52′25″E		1198293	Upload Photo	Q26494243
3, Bear Street	II	3, Bear Street			9 February 1978	TL9745134383; 51°58′22″N 0°52′24″E		1351856	Upload Photo	Q26634921
4, Bear Street	II	4, Bear Street			9 February 1978	TL9746334372; 51°58′22″N 0°52′24″E		1351860	Upload Photo	Q26634925
Butchers	II	5, Bear Street			10 January 1953	TL9744534376; 51°58′22″N 0°52′23″E		1033618	Upload Photo	Q26285102
Clare Cottage	II	6, Bear Street			10 January 1953	TL9745434365; 51°58′22″N 0°52′24″E		1283900	Upload Photo	Q26572716
7 and 9, Bear Street	II	7 and 9, Bear Street			9 February 1978	TL9742334362; 51°58′22″N 0°52′22″E		1351857	Upload Photo	Q26634922
8-12, Bear Street	II	8-12, Bear Street			26 October 1977	TL9744234354; 51°58′21″N 0°52′23″E		1033624	Upload Photo	Q26285108
Weavers	II	14, Bear Street			23 March 1961	TL9743234344; 51°58′21″N 0°52′23″E		1351861	Upload Photo	Q26634926
Fir Cottage	II	16, Bear Street			9 February 1978	TL9742634317; 51°58′20″N 0°52′22″E		1198339	Upload Photo	Q26494288
Stourbank	II	19, Bear Street			17 October 1975	TL9738134344; 51°58′21″N 0°52′20″E		1198222	Upload Photo	Q26494175
The Manse	II	27, Bear Street			10 January 1953	TL9734734332; 51°58′21″N 0°52′18″E		1033620	Upload Photo	Q26285104
29, Bear Street	II	29, Bear Street			9 February 1978	TL9733634327; 51°58′21″N 0°52′17″E		1351858	Upload Photo	Q26634923
Stourbank Cottage	II	34, Bear Street			9 February 1978	TL9734334308; 51°58′20″N 0°52′18″E		1033625	Upload Photo	Q26285109
New Leaf	II	35 and 37, Bear Street			9 February 1978	TL9730734321; 51°58′20″N 0°52′16″E		1198252	Upload Photo	Q26494203
39, Bear Street	II	39, Bear Street			9 February 1978	TL9729634322; 51°58′20″N 0°52′15″E		1033621	Upload Photo	Q26285105
Cob Cottage	II	40, Bear Street			23 March 1961	TL9731134308; 51°58′20″N 0°52′16″E		1033626	Upload Photo	Q26285111
41, Bear Street	II	41, Bear Street			9 February 1978	TL9728334322; 51°58′20″N 0°52′15″E		1351859	Upload Photo	Q26634924
Parkers	II	43, Bear Street			10 January 1953	TL9725734322; 51°58′20″N 0°52′13″E		1198265	Upload Photo	Q26494216
44 and 46, Bear Street	II	44 and 46, Bear Street			9 February 1978	TL9729734307; 51°58′20″N 0°52′15″E		1198341	Upload Photo	Q26494290
Floodgate Cottage	II	48, Bear Street			9 February 1978	TL9728134306; 51°58′20″N 0°52′15″E		1033627	Upload Photo	Q26285112
50, Bear Street	II	50, Bear Street			9 February 1978	TL9726834304; 51°58′20″N 0°52′14″E		1198344	Upload Photo	Q26494293
52 and 54, Bear Street	II	52 and 54, Bear Street			9 February 1978	TL9724434303; 51°58′20″N 0°52′13″E		1033628	Upload Photo	Q26285113
Sergeants	II	70, Bear Street			10 January 1953	TL9715834298; 51°58′20″N 0°52′08″E		1033629	Upload Photo	Q26285114
Riverside Cottages	II	72-78, Bear Street			9 February 1978	TL9714334297; 51°58′20″N 0°52′07″E		1198447	Upload Photo	Q26494478
81, Bear Street	II	81, Bear Street			9 February 1978	TL9701534313; 51°58′20″N 0°52′01″E		1033622	Upload Photo	Q26285106
82, Bear Street	II	82, Bear Street			9 February 1978	TL9709634296; 51°58′20″N 0°52′05″E		1033630	Upload Photo	Q26285115
Star and Garter Public House	II	83, Bear Street			9 February 1978	TL9699434323; 51°58′21″N 0°52′00″E		1033623	Upload Photo	Q26285107
84, Bear Street	II	84, Bear Street			9 February 1978	TL9708534294; 51°58′20″N 0°52′04″E		1033631	Upload Photo	Q26285116
100, Bear Street	II	100, Bear Street			9 February 1978	TL9701834295; 51°58′20″N 0°52′01″E		1198468	Upload Photo	Q26494498
Outbuilding to No 19 (stourbank)	II	Bear Street			9 February 1978	TL9741534354; 51°58′21″N 0°52′22″E		1283953	Upload Photo	Q26572766
Walls to No 19 (stourbank)	II	Bear Street			17 October 1975	TL9736434331; 51°58′21″N 0°52′19″E		1033619	Upload Photo	Q26285103
1, Birch Street	II*	1, Birch Street			10 January 1953	TL9748634392; 51°58′22″N 0°52′25″E		1033591	Upload Photo	Q17532765
2, Birch Street	II	2, Birch Street			9 February 1978	TL9746934399; 51°58′23″N 0°52′25″E		1033632	Upload Photo	Q26285117
4, Birch Street	II	4, Birch Street			10 January 1953	TL9747634416; 51°58′23″N 0°52′25″E		1283822	Upload Photo	Q26572642
Odd Corners	II*	5, Birch Street			10 January 1953	TL9748934404; 51°58′23″N 0°52′26″E		1033592	Upload Photo	Q17532775
6 and 8, Birch Street	II*	6 and 8, Birch Street			9 February 1978	TL9748034421; 51°58′23″N 0°52′25″E		1033633	Upload Photo	Q17532795
7, Birch Street	II	7, Birch Street			23 March 1961	TL9749534410; 51°58′23″N 0°52′26″E		1351883	Upload Photo	Q26634946
9-13, Birch Street	II	9-13, Birch Street			9 February 1978	TL9749834419; 51°58′23″N 0°52′26″E		1033593	Upload Photo	Q26285077
Dresden Cottage	II*	10, Birch Street			9 February 1978	TL9748534427; 51°58′24″N 0°52′26″E		1351862	Upload Photo	Q17534657
Egg Hall	II	14, Birch Street			9 February 1978	TL9748934433; 51°58′24″N 0°52′26″E		1198502	Upload Photo	Q26494531
The Old Maltings	II	17, Birch Street			10 January 1953	TL9751734442; 51°58′24″N 0°52′27″E		1351884	Upload Photo	Q26634947
Little Scrafield	II	18, Birch Street			9 February 1978	TL9749434444; 51°58′24″N 0°52′26″E		1033590	Upload Photo	Q26285076
20 and 22, Birch Street	II	20 and 22, Birch Street			9 February 1978	TL9750034461; 51°58′25″N 0°52′26″E		1351882	Upload Photo	Q26634945
Barn and Cart Shed 60 Metres North West of Wissington Grove	II	Bures Road			29 July 1991	TL9391234404; 51°58′27″N 0°49′18″E		1033466	Upload Photo	Q26284948
Creems	II	Bures Road			16 August 2007	TL9444033860; 51°58′09″N 0°49′45″E		1392208	Upload Photo	Q26671443
Flemings	II	Bures Road, Wiston			10 January 1953	TL9566433749; 51°58′04″N 0°50′49″E		1351885	Upload Photo	Q26634948
Goody's Farmhouse	II	Bures Road			9 February 1978	TL9447333929; 51°58′11″N 0°49′47″E		1033594	Upload Photo	Q26285078
Malting Farmhouse	II	Bures Road, Wiston			9 February 1978	TL9539933753; 51°58′04″N 0°50′35″E		1033596	Upload Photo	Q26285080
Maltings Chase	II	Bures Road			4 October 2007	TL9529733926; 51°58′10″N 0°50′30″E		1392267	Upload Photo	Q26671496
Thatched Cottage	II	Bures Road			9 February 1978	TL9373333868; 51°58′10″N 0°49′08″E		1033595	Upload Photo	Q26285079
Campion's Farmhouse	II	Campions Hill, Wiston			9 February 1978	TL9569633961; 51°58′11″N 0°50′51″E		1351886	Upload Photo	Q26634949
Butts	II	Church Lane			9 February 1978	TL9756634204; 51°58′16″N 0°52′29″E		1198644	Upload Photo	Q26494615
Church of St James	I	Church Lane	church building		23 March 1961	TL9756434223; 51°58′17″N 0°52′29″E		1033597	Church of St James More images	Q17541655
The White House	II	Church Lane			23 March 1961	TL9759934209; 51°58′16″N 0°52′31″E		1283743	Upload Photo	Q26572570
Wall 30 Yards to the North of Church of St James	II	Church Lane			9 February 1978	TL9757134266; 51°58′18″N 0°52′30″E		1033598	Upload Photo	Q26285081
Wall Between Butts and Alston Court	II	Church Lane			9 February 1978	TL9753934210; 51°58′16″N 0°52′28″E		1351887	Upload Photo	Q26634950
1-5, Church Mews	II	1-5, Church Mews, High Street, Nayland With Wissington, CO6 4JF			23 March 1961	TL9751834228; 51°58′17″N 0°52′27″E		1351873	Upload Photo	Q26634936
Nayland War Memorial	II	Church Street, Nayland	war memorial		20 October 2000	TL9749834210; 51°58′17″N 0°52′26″E		1389689	Nayland War Memorial More images	Q26669122
The Vine House	II	1, Court Street			10 January 1953	TL9748234221; 51°58′17″N 0°52′25″E		1351889	Upload Photo	Q26634952
Vine Cottage	II	3, Court Street			10 January 1953	TL9748034211; 51°58′17″N 0°52′25″E		1033601	Upload Photo	Q26285084
Fern Cottage	II	5, Court Street			9 February 1978	TL9747434203; 51°58′16″N 0°52′24″E		1198730	Upload Photo	Q26494697
7, Court Street	II	7, Court Street			10 January 1953	TL9747034192; 51°58′16″N 0°52′24″E		1033602	Upload Photo	Q26285085
The Hatherings	II	14, Court Street			10 January 1953	TL9746934146; 51°58′15″N 0°52′24″E		1283752	Upload Photo	Q26572578
Yew Tree Cottage	II	15, Court Street			23 March 1961	TL9744834164; 51°58′15″N 0°52′23″E		1198750	Upload Photo	Q26494715
16 and 18, Court Street	II	16 and 18, Court Street			10 January 1953	TL9746234137; 51°58′14″N 0°52′24″E		1351888	Upload Photo	Q26634951
17 and 19, Court Street	II*	17 and 19, Court Street			9 February 1978	TL9745434152; 51°58′15″N 0°52′23″E		1351850	Upload Photo	Q17534645
Knollgate	II	20, Court Street			10 January 1953	TL9745734117; 51°58′14″N 0°52′23″E		1033600	Upload Photo	Q26285083
Stour House	II	23, Court Street			10 January 1953	TL9743434113; 51°58′13″N 0°52′22″E		1033603	Upload Photo	Q26285087
The Anchor Public House	II	26, Court Street	pub		9 February 1978	TL9741234050; 51°58′11″N 0°52′21″E		1198688	The Anchor Public House More images	Q26494657
Stour Cottage	II	27, Court Street			23 March 1961	TL9741034084; 51°58′13″N 0°52′21″E		1198765	Upload Photo	Q26494729
Garden Wall to Alston Court	II	Court Street			10 January 1953	TL9748334190; 51°58′16″N 0°52′25″E		1033599	Upload Photo	Q26285082
1, Fen Street	II	1, Fen Street			9 February 1978	TL9757534317; 51°58′20″N 0°52′30″E		1033607	Upload Photo	Q26285091
5, Fen Street	II	5, Fen Street			9 February 1978	TL9760434350; 51°58′21″N 0°52′32″E		1283688	Upload Photo	Q26572523
7, Fen Street	II	7, Fen Street			9 February 1978	TL9761234353; 51°58′21″N 0°52′32″E		1033608	Upload Photo	Q26285092
9, Fen Street	II	9, Fen Street			9 February 1978	TL9762234357; 51°58′21″N 0°52′33″E		1033609	Upload Photo	Q26285093
Fengate	II	11, Fen Street			23 March 1961	TL9762934361; 51°58′21″N 0°52′33″E		1198827	Upload Photo	Q26494787
Ancient House	II	12, Fen Street			23 March 1961	TL9758834366; 51°58′21″N 0°52′31″E		1351851	Upload Photo	Q26634917
Hollyhock Cottage	II	14, Fen Street			9 February 1978	TL9759734371; 51°58′22″N 0°52′31″E		1033604	Upload Photo	Q26285088
Fencote	II	16, Fen Street			9 February 1978	TL9760734374; 51°58′22″N 0°52′32″E		1198781	Upload Photo	Q26494744
18, Fen Street	II	18, Fen Street			9 February 1978	TL9761334378; 51°58′22″N 0°52′32″E		1033605	Upload Photo	Q26285089
Stream House	II	20, Fen Street			9 February 1978	TL9762634383; 51°58′22″N 0°52′33″E		1283684	Upload Photo	Q26572519
40, Fen Street	II	40, Fen Street			9 February 1978	TL9770134422; 51°58′23″N 0°52′37″E		1033606	Upload Photo	Q26285090
2, Gravel Hill	II	2, Gravel Hill			9 February 1978	TL9748834466; 51°58′25″N 0°52′26″E		1033610	Upload Photo	Q26285094
Hill House	II	11, Gravel Hill			10 January 1953	TL9747734498; 51°58′26″N 0°52′25″E		1283672	Upload Photo	Q26572507
1 and 3, High Street	II*	1 and 3, High Street			10 January 1953	TL9751434308; 51°58′20″N 0°52′27″E		1033572	Upload Photo	Q17532756
2, High Street	II	2, High Street			9 February 1978	TL9753434310; 51°58′20″N 0°52′28″E		1033611	Upload Photo	Q26285095
Old Vicarage House	II	4, High Street			23 March 1961	TL9753634292; 51°58′19″N 0°52′28″E		1283636	Upload Photo	Q26572473
5, High Street	II	5, High Street			9 February 1978	TL9751034289; 51°58′19″N 0°52′27″E		1033573	Upload Photo	Q26285054
6 and 8, High Street	II	6 and 8, High Street			10 January 1953	TL9753834273; 51°58′19″N 0°52′28″E		1033567	Upload Photo	Q26285050
7 and 9, High Street	II	7 and 9, High Street			23 March 1961	TL9750734278; 51°58′19″N 0°52′26″E		1351875	Upload Photo	Q26634938
10, High Street	II	10, High Street			10 January 1953	TL9753134262; 51°58′18″N 0°52′28″E		1033568	Upload Photo	Q26285051
12, High Street	II	12, High Street			10 January 1953	TL9753534256; 51°58′18″N 0°52′28″E		1033569	Upload Photo	Q26285052
The Old Guildhall	II	12, High Street			10 January 1953	TL9749934254; 51°58′18″N 0°52′26″E		1351876	Upload Photo	Q26634939
St Jame's Gate	II	14, High Street			10 January 1953	TL9753234242; 51°58′18″N 0°52′28″E		1351872	Upload Photo	Q26634935
15, High Street	II	15, High Street			9 February 1978	TL9749634244; 51°58′18″N 0°52′26″E		1199089	Upload Photo	Q26495003
17, High Street	II	17, High Street			10 January 1953	TL9749434240; 51°58′18″N 0°52′26″E		1033575	Upload Photo	Q26285057
Number 16 (church View) and Number 18	II	18, High Street			10 January 1953	TL9752434242; 51°58′18″N 0°52′27″E		1033570	Upload Photo	Q26285053
Post Office	II	19, High Street			23 March 1961	TL9748934230; 51°58′17″N 0°52′25″E		1033576	Upload Photo	Q26285058
Alston Court	I	High Street	building		10 January 1953	TL9750634206; 51°58′16″N 0°52′26″E		1033571	Alston Court More images	Q17541628
The Obelisk Immediately West of No 18	II	High Street			9 February 1978	TL9751734240; 51°58′17″N 0°52′27″E		1351874	Upload Photo	Q26634937
White Hart Hotel	II	High Street	hotel		10 January 1953	TL9750334269; 51°58′18″N 0°52′26″E		1033574	White Hart Hotel More images	Q26285056
1-5, Mill Street	II	1-5, Mill Street			9 February 1978	TL9748134372; 51°58′22″N 0°52′25″E		1033577	Upload Photo	Q26285059
4, Mill Street	II	4, Mill Street			9 February 1978	TL9750534368; 51°58′22″N 0°52′26″E		1199105	Upload Photo	Q26495017
7, Mill Street	II	7, Mill Street			9 February 1978	TL9748834360; 51°58′21″N 0°52′26″E		1351878	Upload Photo	Q26634941
9, Mill Street	II	9, Mill Street			10 January 1953	TL9749534351; 51°58′21″N 0°52′26″E		1199189	Upload Photo	Q26495089
Cedar Cottage	II	10, Mill Street			9 February 1978	TL9751434349; 51°58′21″N 0°52′27″E		1351877	Upload Photo	Q26634940
Cedar House	II	12, Mill Street			23 March 1961	TL9752134336; 51°58′21″N 0°52′27″E		1283520	Upload Photo	Q26572363
Bridge House	II	Nayland Road			27 January 1982	TL9733134026; 51°58′11″N 0°52′17″E		1267619	Upload Photo	Q26558006
Nayland Bridge	II	Nayland Road	bridge		27 January 1982	TL9738434042; 51°58′11″N 0°52′19″E		1222738	Nayland Bridge More images	Q26517045
Barn to the North East of Wiston Mill	II	Nayland With Wissington, Wiston			9 February 1978	TL9628033324; 51°57′49″N 0°51′20″E		1351855	Upload Photo	Q26634920
Mill House	II	Nayland With Wissington			9 February 1978	TL9605933488; 51°57′55″N 0°51′09″E		1033617	Upload Photo	Q26285101
Wiston Hall	II	Nayland With Wissington, Wiston	building		9 February 1978	TL9550333206; 51°57′47″N 0°50′39″E		1033615	Wiston Hall More images	Q26285100
Wiston Mill	II*	Nayland With Wissington, Wiston	mill		9 February 1978	TL9623333282; 51°57′48″N 0°51′18″E		1033616	Wiston Mill More images	Q17532786
6-10, Newlands Lane	II	6-10, Newlands Lane			9 February 1978	TL9764734218; 51°58′17″N 0°52′34″E		1033578	Upload Photo	Q26285060
2 and 4, Stoke Road	II	2 and 4, Stoke Road			9 February 1978	TL9752534467; 51°58′25″N 0°52′28″E		1033579	Upload Photo	Q26285061
10 and 12, Stoke Road	II	10 and 12, Stoke Road			9 February 1978	TL9755134487; 51°58′25″N 0°52′29″E		1283466	Upload Photo	Q26572314
11 and 13, Stoke Road	II	11 and 13, Stoke Road, Nayland			9 February 1978	TL9755734465; 51°58′25″N 0°52′29″E		1033580	Upload Photo	Q26285062
Hillside	II	14, Stoke Road			9 February 1978	TL9755434509; 51°58′26″N 0°52′29″E		1351879	Upload Photo	Q26634942
Ranworth House	II	22, Stoke Road			9 February 1978	TL9762834523; 51°58′26″N 0°52′33″E		1199258	Upload Photo	Q26495152
Longwood House	II	31, Stoke Road			10 January 1953	TL9773434505; 51°58′26″N 0°52′39″E		1351880	Upload Photo	Q26634943
United Reformed Church	II	Stoke Road			24 October 1988	TL9760134476; 51°58′25″N 0°52′32″E		1351944	Upload Photo	Q26635006
Bulmer's Farmhouse	II	Wiston Road, Wiston			9 February 1978	TL9631734168; 51°58′17″N 0°51′24″E		1199275	Upload Photo	Q26495167

== See also ==
- Grade I listed buildings in Suffolk
- Grade II* listed buildings in Suffolk

== Sources ==
- Bettely, James; Pevsner, Nikolaus (2015) [1961], Suffolk: West, The Buildings of England, New Haven and London: Yale University Press, ISBN 978-0-300-19655-9
