= Nordrach =

- Municipality
- Coat of arms

- Location of Nordrach within Ortenaukreis district
- Interactive map of Nordrach
- Location within Germany Location within Baden-Württemberg
- Coordinates: 48°23′53″N 8°4′48″E
- Country: Germany
- State: Baden-Württemberg
- Admin. region: Freiburg
- District: Ortenaukreis

Government
  - Mayor (2023–31): Carsten Erhardt (FDP)

Area
  - Total: 37.75 km^{2} (14.58 sq mi)
- Elevation: 297 m (974 ft)

Population (2025-12-31)
  - Total: 2,026
  - Density: 53.67/km^{2} (139.0/sq mi)
- Time zone: UTC+01:00 (CET)
  - Summer (DST): UTC+02:00 (CEST)
- Postal codes: 77787
- Dialling codes: 07838
- Vehicle registration: OG, BH, KEL, LR, WOL
- Website: www.nordrach.de

Nordrach (German pronunciation: [ˈnɔʁt.ʁax]; Low Alemannic: Noodere) is a municipality in the district of Ortenau in Baden-Württemberg in Germany. Nearly 80% of its area is forested, part of the Black Forest.

Dr. Otto Walther and his wife, Dr. Hope Adams, founded a hospital for treatment of tuberculosis nearby, the Nordrach Clinic, in the late 19th century. She was the first woman in Germany to be granted a licence to practice as a doctor.

== Demographics ==
Population development:

| Year | Inhabitants |
|---|---|
| 1990 | 2,019 |
| 2001 | 1,994 |
| 2011 | 1,930 |
| 2021 | 1,847 |
