= Hope Bridges Adams Lehmann =

German physician (1855–1916)

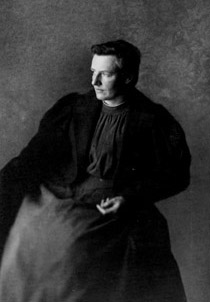
- Hope Bridges Adams Lehmann
- Born: 16 December 1855; London
- Died: 10 October 1916 (aged 60); Munich
- Scientific career
- Fields: gynecology

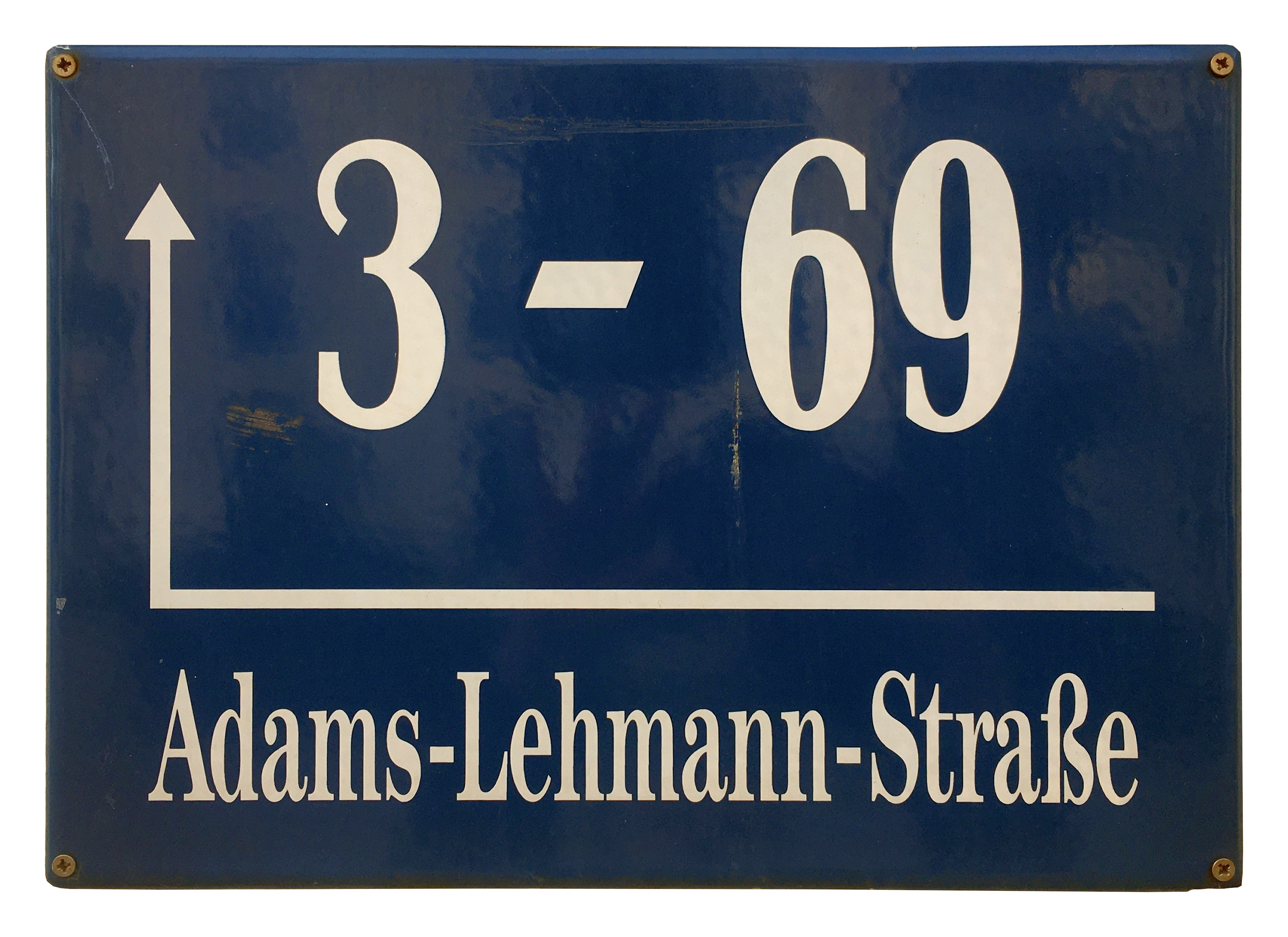
House number sign in the Adams-Lehmann-Straße in Munich, Germany. The street in the quarter Schwabing was named after her in 2004.

Hope Bridges Adams Lehmann (16 December 1855 – 10 October 1916) was the first female general practitioner and gynecologist in Munich, Germany.

She was the daughter of the English journalist and railway engineer William Bridges Adams. She studied at Bedford College, London University, and then at the University of Leipzig before joining the medical register in Dublin in 1881. She married fellow doctor Otto Walther in 1882. They ran a medical practice together in Frankfurt am Main until 1886. They had two children.

After she contracted tuberculosis, the couple opened a sanatorium, the Nordrach Clinic, in the Black Forest. They ran the clinic together until 1893, and they were divorced in 1895. She moved back to Munich and married Carl Lehmann in 1896. Although she obtained her medical diploma in Germany in 1880, she was not acknowledged as a doctor or permitted to use the title until 1904.

== Works ==
- Das Frauenbuch. Ein ärztlicher Ratgeber für die Frau in der Familie und bei Frauenkrankheiten. Bd. 1: Körperbau und Gesundheitspflege, Bd. 2: Krankenpflege. Süddeutsches Verlags-Institut, Stuttgart 1896
- Die Gesundheit im Haus Adams-Lehmann, Hope Bridges. - Stuttgart: Süddeut. Verl.-Inst., 1899
- Die Arbeit der Frau. In Zepler, Wally (1919). Sozialismus und Frauenfrage, Berlin, Bruno Cassirer, pp.46-55
