= Nayland =

Village in Suffolk, England

Coordinates: 51.97117°N 0.87384°E

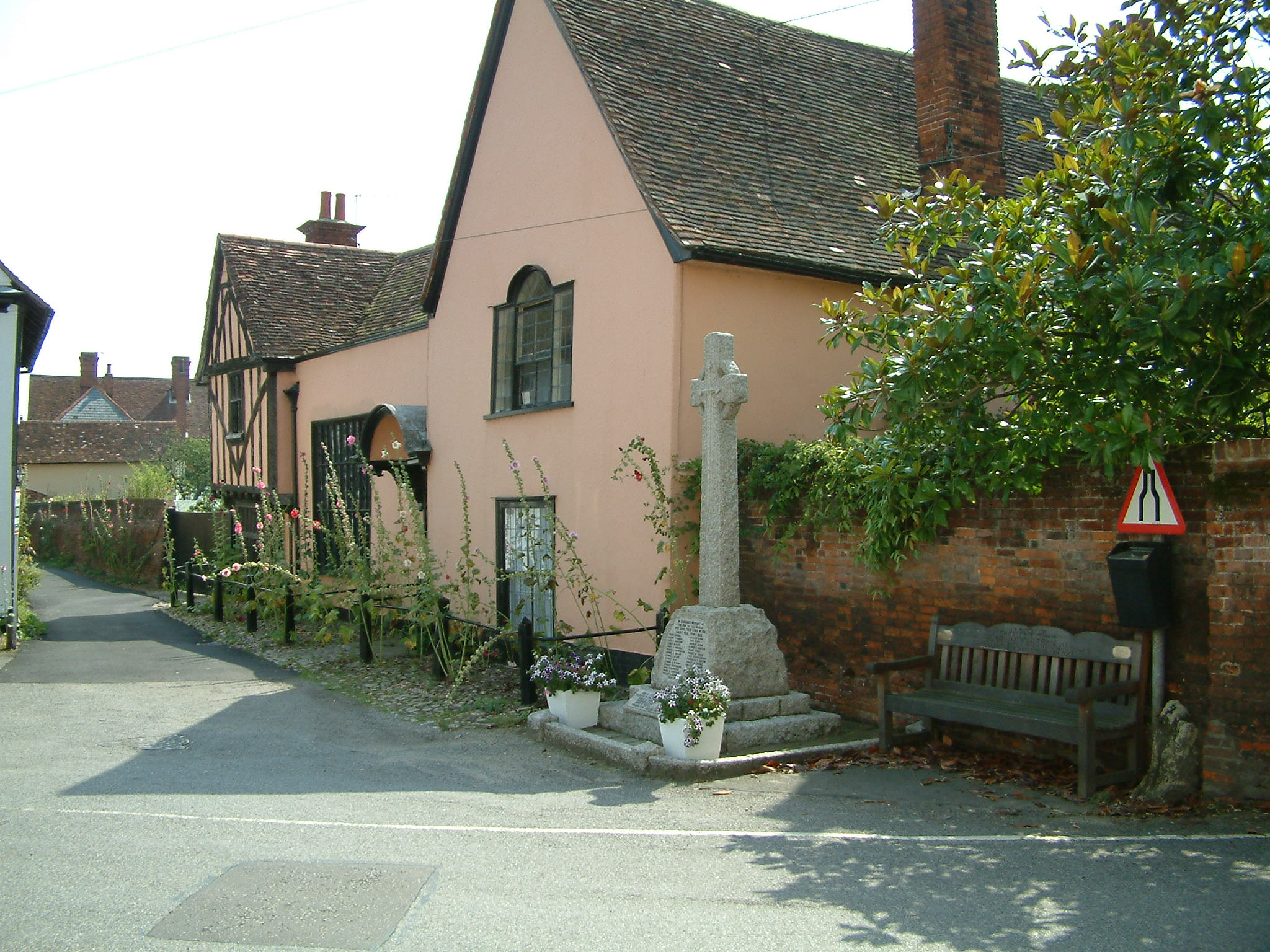
- Alston Court and War Memorial, located in the centre of Nayland village

- Location within Suffolk
- Population: 938 (2011)
- OS grid reference: TL975342
- Civil parish: Nayland-with-Wissington
- District: Babergh
- Shire county: Suffolk
- Region: East
- Country: England
- Sovereign state: United Kingdom
- Post town: Colchester
- Postcode district: CO6
- Dialling code: 01206
- Police: Suffolk
- Fire: Suffolk
- Ambulance: East of England
- UK Parliament: South Suffolk

Nayland is a village and former civil parish, now in the parish of Nayland-with-Wissington, in the Babergh district, in the county of Suffolk, England. It is in the Stour Valley on the Suffolk side of the border between Suffolk and Essex. In 2011 the built-up area had a population of 938.

== History ==
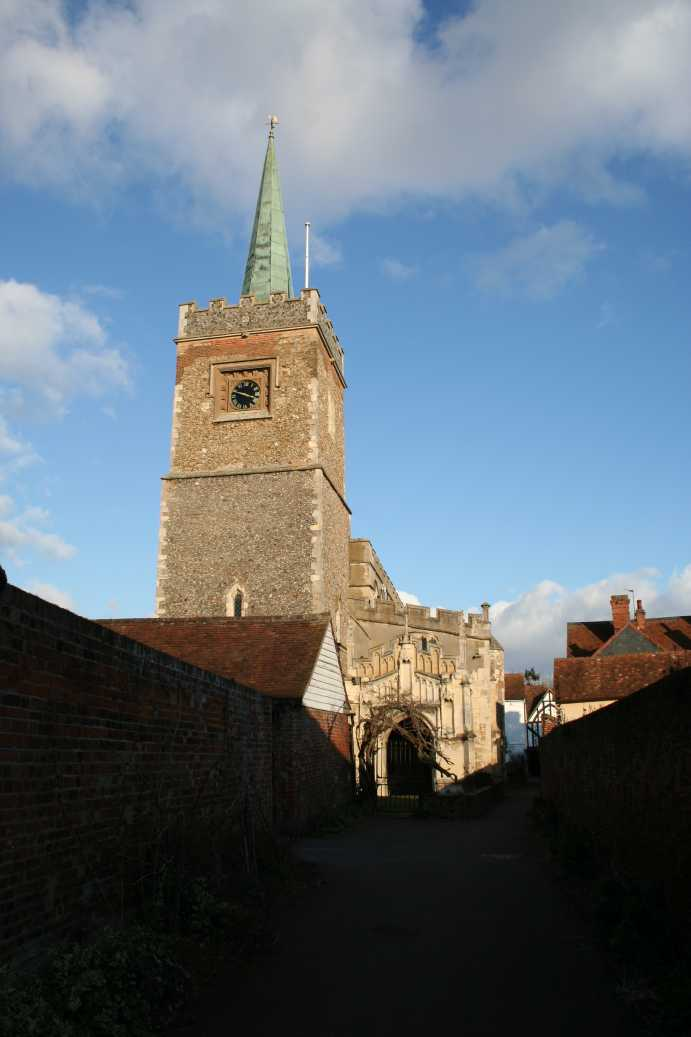
St James' Church

From an article by Rosemary Knox, Wissington

Nayland village and the adjoining rural hamlet of Wissington (these days usually called 'Wiston'), were originally two separate parishes; on 25 March 1884 they were united into one civil parish, Nayland-with-Wissington, although the two ecclesiastical parishes remain separate. In 1881 the civil parish had a population of 901.

Nayland and Wiston lie on the northern bank of the River Stour, which divides Essex and Suffolk. Originally they were two different parishes with different histories. The name Nayland means an island, and the village developed on the higher ground amidst the lower river flood plain. It provided a good place for both a safe crossing of the river and an early manorial centre, probably a wooden castle. These advantages brought a market by 1227 and, by the late Middle Ages, it was a successful small town. The owners of the manor moved away and the little town was ruled by its cloth merchants, many of whom were very well off by the standards of the day. They were surpassed in wealth only by the merchants of Lavenham and Long Melford. They built fine Tudor houses and a fine church and the prosperity continued into the beginning of the seventeenth century. From then on the cloth trade began to move away, and although other trades like leather and soap manufacture developed, Nayland came to rely mainly on being a centre of commerce for the surrounding countryside. During the eighteenth and nineteenth centuries the village drifted gently on, a relative backwater. The navigation on the river opened up but it did not bring a large increase in trade and the Navigation Company struggled to survive. The good result of this period of partial stagnation was that relative poverty prevented the beautiful old houses being knocked down to provide smart new homes and thus Nayland still possesses its Tudor and Stuart streets.

Nayland did have a small agricultural area but most of it lay out in the middle of the parish of Wiston and is nowadays considered to be part of Wiston. Although the official name for Wiston is Wissington, early documents suggest that Wiston is the original name, and it is certainly the one the local people always use. It had been a part of the manor of Nayland in 1066 but by 1087 had been given to a separate Norman family who lived across the river in Essex at Little Horkesley. From then on the history of the two places diverged. Wiston was administered from over the river and its links were with Little Horkesley rather than Nayland. The Lords of the Manor built the little Norman church, which still survives as a separate parish church, and they ran their estates in Wiston in conjunction with their land in Essex. The early wills and the taxation lists which still exist show only farmers in Wiston, and it remained purely an agricultural parish until the end of the nineteenth century. The manor was sold to more distant owners and the old manorial tenements became copyholds and then freehold farms.

The village and the surrounding area, like much of East Anglia, was a hotbed of Puritan sentiment during much of the 17th century. At least as early as 1629, parishioners such as Gregory Stone were censured for not kneeling at communion. By the mid-1630s, the Stone family and others had departed for the Massachusetts Bay Colony as part of the wave of emigration that occurred during the Great Migration.

In 1883 the new West Suffolk county council decided that the two strangely divided civil parishes should be joined as Nayland with Wissington, a process which Wiston resented but could not prevent. The needs of the two parts of parish, part semi urban, part agricultural, still make a slightly uneasy union. The Nayland with Wissington Parish Council was created in 1894 as a result of the Local Government Act of that year.

But Wiston had not disappeared. In 1896 Dr Jane Walker bought two farms (both technically in Nayland) and founded the East Anglian Sanatorium. This opened in 1901 for private patients and soon a lower block for free patients was added. A children's block was also built. The writer George Gissing found himself as a patient here for a couple of months in 1901 and the Canadian artist Emily Carr was a patient for over a year in 1903–1904. The Sanatorium continued to treat TB until that disease was conquered in the 1950s, when it closed. The lower block was sold off for housing and the upper block became a hospital for the mentally handicapped. While they functioned, the Sanatorium and the hospital were the centre of Wiston, as they provided most of the local employment. In 1991 the hospital itself closed under 'Care in the Community'. The original 'arts and crafts' Sanatorium, designed by Smith and Brewer, became a listed building and was converted into eight houses, while the rest was knocked down and replaced by another eight houses. Wiston still has seven working farms, six being old Wiston farms and one an old Nayland holding, while the other small farms and smallholdings have been absorbed into the bigger ones, leaving it still predominantly agricultural. The mechanisation of farming has, however, cut the need for workers dramatically, so that most of the residents of Wiston now work either at home or elsewhere.

== Nayland today ==
The parish of Nayland-with-Wissington is in the district of Babergh and the parliamentary constituency of South Suffolk. It has a population of 938 and is situated in the Dedham Vale, an area of Outstanding Natural Beauty on the River Stour, the boundary between Suffolk and Essex. It was bypassed in 1969 by the A134 road which links Colchester, six miles south of Nayland, to Sudbury, nine miles (14 km) to its north.

There are 15th-century buildings in the village, Alston Court being one of these (see image) which also contains a 13th-century section.

The parish church of St James is a Grade I listed building. It contains a famous painting, Christ Blessing the Bread and Wine (1809), by John Constable.

Littlegarth School has been located at Horkesley Park, Nayland, since 1994.

There is also a small airfield with grass runways suitable for landing small planes. The runways, number of takeoffs and landings, and plane types are limited, however, by planning restrictions.

== Reference works ==
- Leigh Alston, et al. (2000) A Walk Around Historic Nayland, Nayland with Wissington Conservation Society.
- Sally Arnold (2003) The Cuddons of Nayland – An Ancient Suffolk Family (out of print, but a pdf version is available on line – link), Private Publication.
- Eric Barton (2003) A Village Boy, Braiswick, Felixstow, Suffolk – ISBN 1-898030-38-3.
- Paula Blanchard (1987) The Life of Emily Carr, Vancouver: Douglas & McIntyre ISBN 0-88894-580-9
- R B Evans (1990) St James' Church – Nayland, Suffolk, Parochial Church Council – Revised (2004) J D Weston, T Wilson.
- Mary George (2004) A History of Nayland Schools – Book 1, Nayland Primary School, Bear St. Nayland.
- Mary George (2004) Nayland Schools at War – Book 2, Nayland Primary School, Bear St. Nayland.
- Mary George (2004) For King and Country – Book 3. Nayland Primary School, Bear St. Nayland.
- Denis Halliday, Rosemary Knox, Wendy Sparrow, Keith Worricker & Karen Warren (2003) Nayland – Suffolk Town and Village. Including a Brief History of Wissington – 2nd Revision, Nayland with Wissington Conservation Society.
- Rosemary Knox (2001) Is it Wiston or Wissington? Dennis Plenty & Co., Colchester, Essex – ISBN 0-9541105-0-1.
- Anna & Michael Smith (2000) Dr Jane Walker and Her Hospital, The Lavenham Press, Lavenham, Suffolk – ISBN 0-9535780-1-1
- Wendy Sparrow & Andora Carver (2002) Nayland & Wiston, 1860s – 1950s, A Portrait in Photographs, Nayland with Wissington Conservation Society.
- Patrick Surrey (2003) Faith of Our Fathers – A Story of a Suffolk Catholic Parish, The Hadleigh Catholic Parish, Hadleigh, Suffolk
