= Nayland-with-Wissington =

- Civil parish
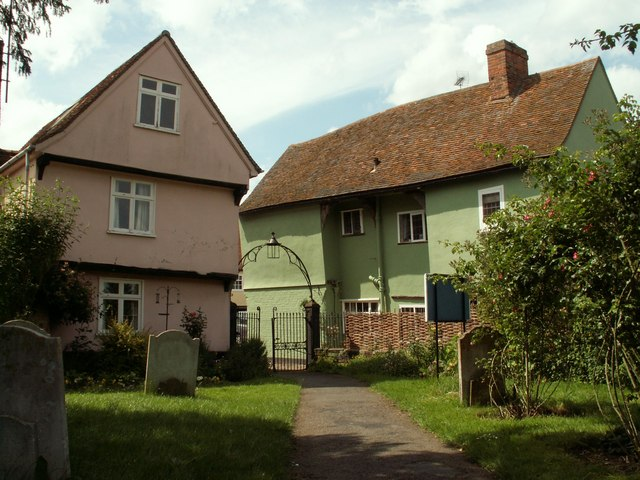
- Interactive map of Nayland-with-Wissington
- Coordinates: 51.970°N 0.858°E
- Primary council: Babergh
- County: Suffolk
- Region: East of England
- Established: 1884
- Status: Parish
- Main settlements: Nayland, Wissington

Government
  - UK Parliament: South Suffolk

Population ((2011))
  - Total: 1,163
- Postal code: CO6 4LD
- Area code: CO
- Website: Nayland with Wissington Parish Council

Nayland-with-Wissington is a civil parish which comprises the larger village of Nayland and the adjoining rural village of Wissington (these days usually referred to as 'Wiston' by local residents (Knox, 2001)). They were originally two separate parishes and were united into one civil parish in 1884. However, the ecclesiastical parishes remain separate. In 2011 the parish had a population of 1163.

Nayland and Wiston lie on the northern bank of the River Stour which divides Essex and Suffolk in England. It is in the Babergh district.

== Governance ==
The parish forms part of the electoral ward called Nayland. The population of this ward taken at the 2011 Census was 1,845.
