= Wissington, Suffolk =

Village in Suffolk, England

Coordinates: 51.965°N 0.846°E

Wissington
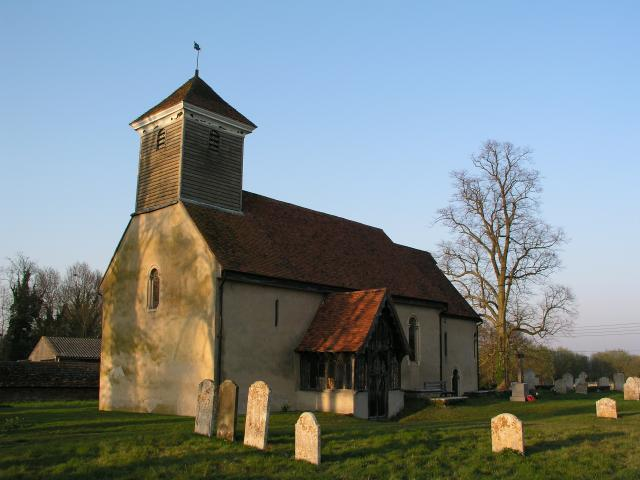
- Church of St Mary

- Location within Suffolk
- OS grid reference: TL955334
- Civil parish: Nayland-with-Wissington
- District: Babergh
- Shire county: Suffolk
- Region: East
- Country: England
- Sovereign state: United Kingdom
- Post town: COLCHESTER
- Postcode district: CO6

Wissington or Wiston is a small village and former civil parish, now in the parish of Nayland-with-Wissington, in the Babergh district, in south Suffolk, England. In 1881 the civil parish had a population of 191. On 1 April 1844 the parish was abolished and merged with Nayland to form "Nayland with Wissington".
