= Nordrach Clinic =

Germany clinic

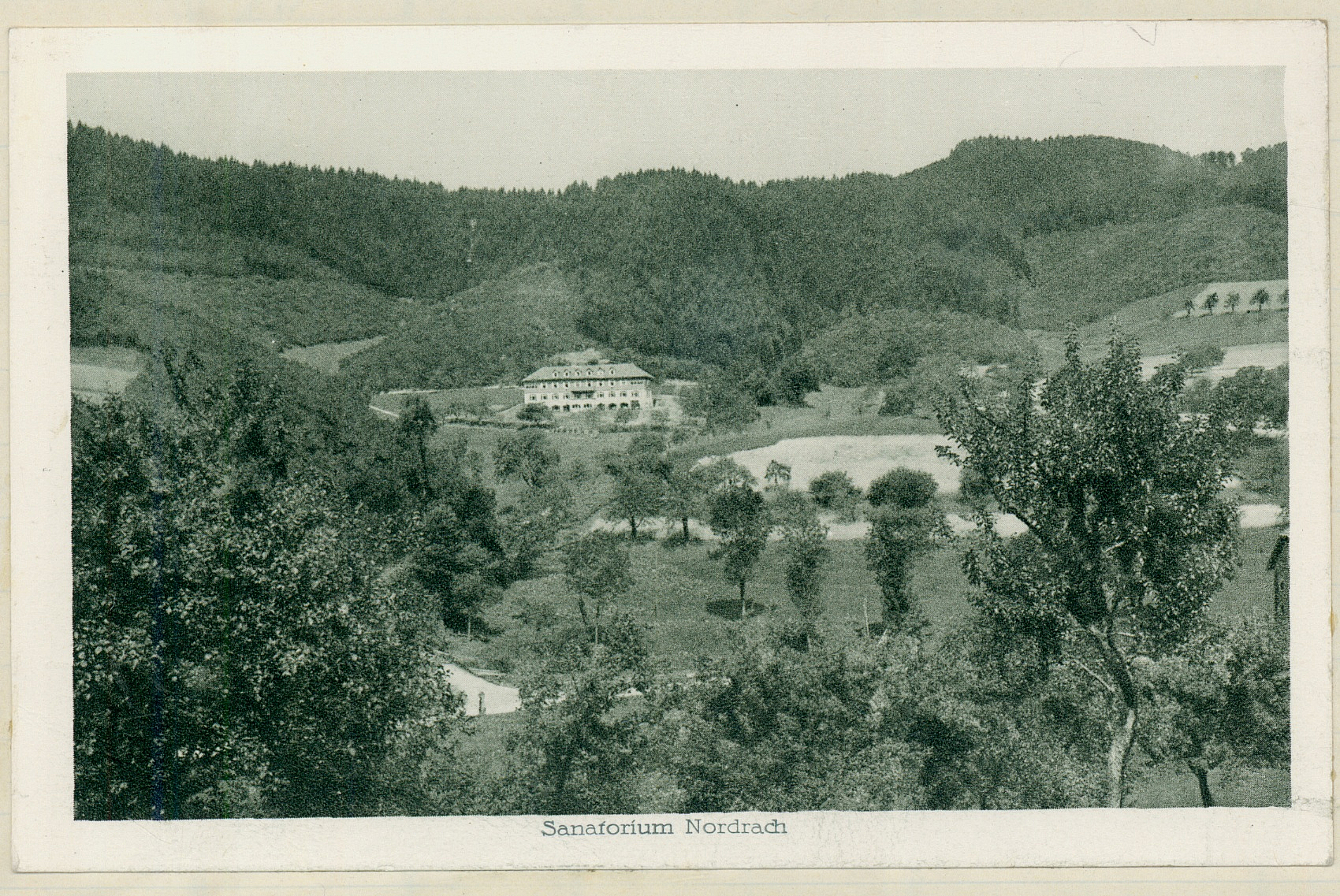
Photograph of Nordrach Sanatorium in the 1910s

The Nordrach Clinic, or Nordrach Sanatorium, was a clinic for the treatment of advanced tuberculosis in Germany. It was established in the late 19th century by Dr. Otto Walther in Nordrach in the Black Forest region of southwestern Germany. Some of Dr. Walther's uncustomary treatments included "overfeeding" (patients were given three daily plentiful feedings of milk, cheese, meat, sweets, starches, and fruits), the complete abstinence from any drugs (save morphine for the critically ill), and plentiful rest. The rooms of the clinic, located at 1,500 feet (460 m) above sea level, had an abundance of open windows to expose patients to the putative positive effects of winds.

The Nordrach Clinic was small, housing a maximum of fifty patients, and very expensive. News of the successes of Nordrach soon spread and helped give rise to the sanatorium business in nearby Switzerland, a country whose landscape was much more suited to the high altitude and fresh wind regimen stressed by Nordrach. The Nordrach experiment also gave rise to several "mini Nordrachs", most notably Nordrach-in-Mendip, Nordach-on-Dee and Nordrach-in-Wales.

Nordrach thrived as a sanatorium for people with tuberculosis through the early 1930s. However, as a Jew, Otto Walther came under increased scrutiny by the National Socialist (Nazi) Party after it came to power in Germany in 1933 and the clinic was eventually forced to close.
