= Annie Clark (physician) =

British physician

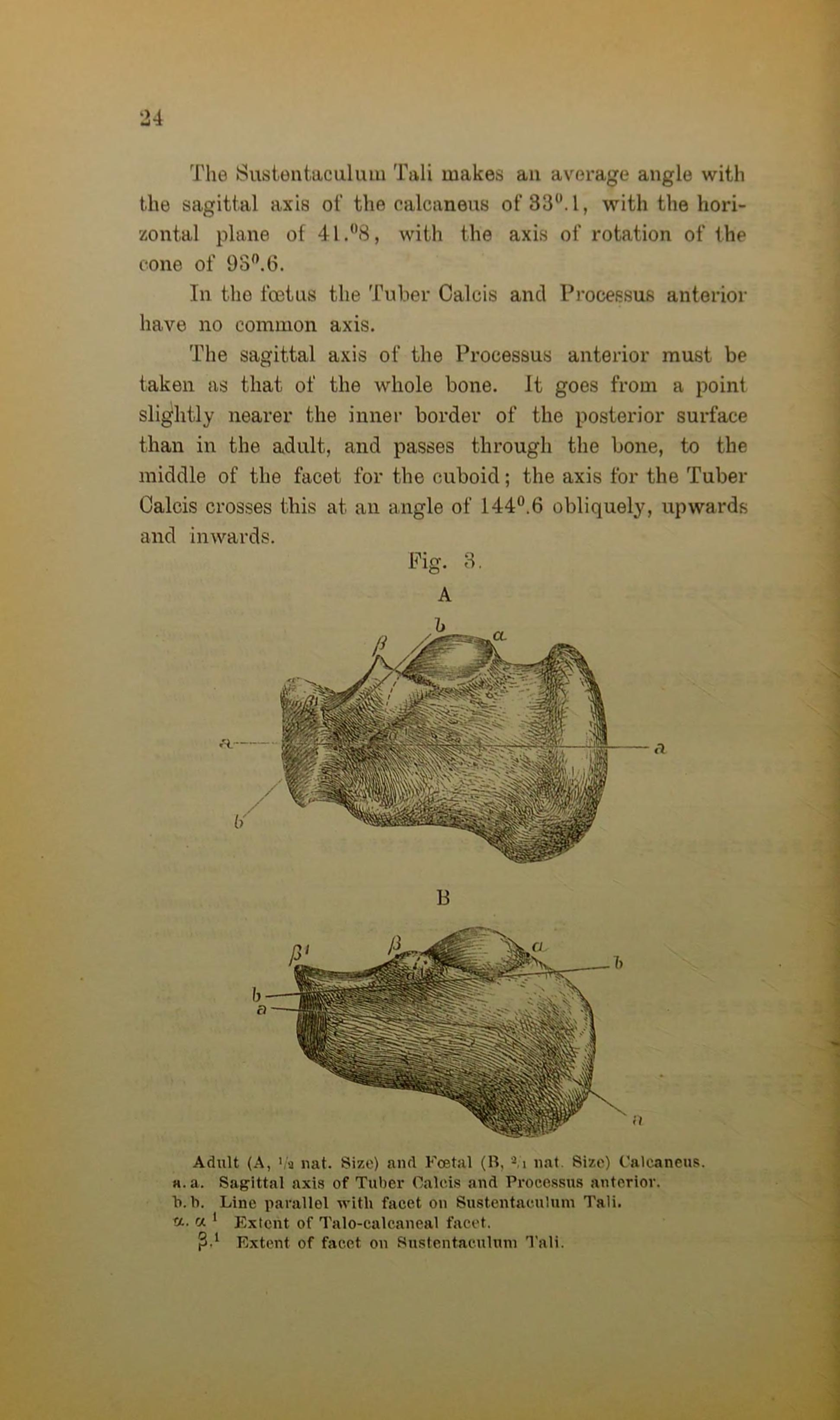
Illustration of the adult and foetal heel bone (calcaneus) from Annie Clark's MD thesis

Dr Ann Elizabeth Clark (1844–1925) was among the first female medical students at the University of Edinburgh. She was affiliated with the group recognised as the Edinburgh Seven, which included Dr Sophia L. Jex-Blake, Isabel Thorne, Edith Pechey, Matilda Chaplin, Helen Evans and later Mary Anderson and Emily Bovell.

== Life ==
Clark was fifth of the 12 children of Eleanor and James Clark of Street, Somerset. She travelled to the University of Bern with Jex-Blake and Pechey to study medicine. Her graduation thesis was titled The Ankle Joint in Man. She was licensed in medicine and midwifery by the Royal College of Physicians of Ireland on 27 May 1878.

Committed to a career in medicine, Clark settled in Birmingham dedicating time to clinical work. She worked in the fields of gynaecology and anaesthesiology and became the assistant to Lawson Tait. She was entrusted with the care of Dr Jex-Blake in her later years, travelling from Birmingham to administer a treatment of anaesthetic.

== Writings ==
- Clark, Ann Elizabeth (1877). The Ankle Joint in Man. Bern: K. J. Wyss.
