= Annie Reay Barker =

English physician (1851–1945)

- Born: 20 April 1851; Stoke-on-Trent, England
- Died: 2 June 1945 (aged 94); Virginia Water, England
- Education: University of Paris (MD); University of Edinburgh; Ladies Collegiate School
- Occupation: Physician
- Years active: 1876–1882

Annie Reay Barker (20 April 1851 – 2 June 1945) was an English physician and the eighth woman to be added to the registry of the British Medical Association.

After beginning her medical studies at the University of Edinburgh, during the pioneering campaign for women's higher education in the United Kingdom, she earned her Doctor of Medicine degree from the University of Paris in 1877. In 1878, she was the first woman to be appointed to a senior medical position at the Birmingham and Midland Hospital for Women.

In 1896, she was admitted to Holloway Sanatorium for "chronic mania", where she stayed until her death in 1945.

== Early life and education ==
On 20 April 1851, Barker was born in Stoke-on-Trent, England. She had at least two brothers and a sister. Her father, Edmund John Barker (18 March 1818 – 27 July 1888), was a doctor and owned a medical practice in North Hampshire. Her mother was Emma Rowland.

Barker attended the Ladies Collegiate School.

=== Medical degree ===
In the summer of 1871, Barker began studying medicine at the University of Edinburgh Medical School.

On 17 July 1873, Barker signed a petition to the Senatus Academicus of the University of St Andrews, alongside Sophia Jex-Blake and eight other women, (Note: Namely, Isabella Margaret Foggo, Alice Stewart Ker, Sophy Jane Massingberd-Mundy, Agnes McLaren, Edith Pechey, Jane Russell Rorison, Elizabeth Vinson, and Elizabeth Ireland Walker.) for admission to the University, after the University of Edinburgh refused to grant the women medical degrees. The petition was rejected as the University did not have a medical school.

In 1875, Barker also signed a petition in support of the Universities (Scotland) (Degrees to Women) Bill, which entitled women to enter and graduate from Scottish universities. (Note: The petition was also signed by Matilda Chaplin Ayrton, Emily Bovell, Anna Dahms, Isabella Margaret Foggo, Sophia Jex-Blake, Alice Stewart Ker, Mary Adamson Anderson Marshall, Sophy Jane Massingberd-Mundy, Agnes McLaren, Edith Pechey, Jane Russell Rorison, Rose Anna Shedlock, Isabel Thorne, Elizabeth Vinson, and Elizabeth Ireland Walker.) The motion was voted out by 194 votes to 151 votes.

Barker went to the University of Paris to continue studying medicine. It was theorised that Jex-Blake saw this departure as a betrayal, and excluded Barker from her book Medical Women: A Thesis and a History.

In July 1876, Barker applied to Birmingham and Midland Hospital for Women (BMHW), for the position of house surgeon. Although she had yet to complete her degree, the hospital offered her the position, and allowed her to leave for Paris and defend her thesis in April 1877. She was later conferred Doctor of Medicine.

The Medical Act 1876 enabled medicine to be practiced with European degrees, regardless of sex. The Kings and Queens College of Physicians in Ireland (KQCPI) was the first medical body to allow women to take its licencing examinations. On 9 January 1878, Barker signed the KQCPI roll of licentiates in medicine and midwifery, and became the eighth woman to be added to the registry of the British Medical Association.

== Career ==
In April 1878, Barker resigned as a house surgeon of BMHW. In June 1878, BMHW advertised two positions, an assistant surgeon and a physician. However, both positions required the applicants to be Fellows of the Royal College of Surgeons or have a medical degree, and be registered under the Medical Act. As the Royal College of Surgeons did not admit women as Fellows until 1911, Barker could only apply for the physician role.

In August 1878, Barker was given the role of out-patient physician, and appointed to the medical board, alongside Lawson Tait. She was the first woman to be appointed a senior position at the hospital. Between August 1878 and August 1882, Barker attended 38 out of 46 board meetings, and chaired eight of the meetings.

In October 1881, Barker gave the inaugural address at the London School of Medicine for Women. She congratulated the 40 female students for their efforts, and mentioned that many schools of medicine for women have been established in other towns.

In September 1882, Barker was absent for the monthly board meeting, due to ill health. In November 1882, she said she had a small improvement, but was still unable to work. However, in February 1883, she resigned due to ill health, and was thanked by the board of governors for her services to the hospital.

== Personal life ==
Barker was Anglican.

Upon resignation, Barker returned to Aldershot, and continued to practice medicine privately in London until 1888. On 23 March 1896, she was admitted to the Holloway Sanatorium by her brother, Frederick. Barker was diagnosed with "chronic mania", and no underlying cause was determined. However, Barker remained listed on the British Medical Association registry until 1903, and on The Medical Directory until 1905.

On 11 July 1907, 11 years after her initial admission, the first surviving entry of Barker stated:

Patient continues in a state of chronic mania asserting that she has sovereign right here, always asking for a cab to drive to Buckingham Palace or Aldershot. Jealous of any authority other than her own, forbidding the doctors to go near patients etc etc—She is occasionally noisy at night—She refuses any physical examination.

Later entries indicate that Barker thought that she was the only doctor in the sanatorium, and that she was the Queen of England. Although no family history of mental illness was recorded in the entries, Barker's younger sister was also admitted in a mental hospital, Brooke House Mental Hospital, and died in 1938, at 81 years old.

On 2 June 1945, Barker died. In 1949, her £50,000 estate was claimed by a distant relative.

== Publications ==
Barker's Thesis, 1877

- Barker, Annie Reay (16 April 1877). Considérations sur les soins à donner à la femme en dehors de tout accident, avant, pendant et après l'accouchement [Considerations regarding the care of the woman in the absence of complications—before, during, and after childbirth] (MD thesis) (in French). University of Paris.
