= List of people educated at Queen's College, London =

This article lists notable alumnae of Queen's College, London, an independent girls' school, the first to award academic qualifications to women in Great Britain, and the first to receive a royal charter for that purpose.

== Nineteenth century ==
- Dorothea Beale (1848–1855), founder of Cheltenham Ladies' College and St Hilda's College, Oxford
- Sophia Beale, English artist and writer
- Gertrude Bell (1884–1886), archaeologist and diplomat
- Matilda Ellen Bishop (c. 1858–60), first principal of Royal Holloway College
- Emily Bovell, doctor; one of the 'Edinburgh Seven'; later, wife of William Allen Sturge
- Frances Mary Buss (1848), founder of North London Collegiate School
- Dame Frances Dove (1860–62), founder of Wycombe Abbey and headmistress of St Leonard's School at St Andrews
- Olive Garnett (1871–1958), diarist
- Elizabeth Garrett Anderson, first woman to qualify as a doctor of medicine in Britain
- Beatrice Harraden, writer and suffragette
- Octavia Hill, social reformer; co-founder of the National Trust; coined the term "Green Belt"
- Nora Kerin (1883–1970), actress
- Sophia Jex-Blake (1858–61), co-founder of the London School of Medicine for Women
- Adelaide Anne Procter, poet and philanthropist
- Mary Catherine Rowsell, novelist, children's writer and dramatist
- Mary Gleed Tuttiett, novelist and poet known by pen-name Maxwell Gray
- Mary Wardell, founder of the Convalescent Home for Scarlet Fever in Stanmore
- Frances Julia Wedgwood, feminist novelist, biographer, historian and literary critic
- Frances Helen Prideaux, the first woman to be competitively appointed as a surgeon to a London hospital
- Sarah Williams (1837–1868), poet
- Thomazine Mary Lockyer, astronomer, suffragist, Unitarian

== Twentieth century ==
- Lesley Abdela MBE (1962), writer and broadcaster
- Evelyn Abelson, artist
- Emma Anderson (1982–3), musician
- Peggy Appiah MBE, children's writer and philanthropist
- Asma al-Assad, the wife of the deposed Syrian President Bashar al-Assad and former First lady of Syria.
- Miki Berenyi (1980–5), musician
- Tania Bryer (1973–80), broadcaster
- Harriet Cass (1962–70), broadcaster
- Kathleen Cavendish, Marchioness of Hartington, sister of John F. Kennedy
- Susannah Constantine (1978), journalist, television presenter and fashion guru
- Dame Cicely Courtneidge (1905–6), actress
- Eleanor Davies-Colley, first female elected to the Royal College of Surgeons
- Emma Freud (1973–80), broadcaster
- Penelope Gilliatt (1942–7), journalist
- Catherine Goodman (1972–9), painter; artistic director of The Prince's Drawing School
- Daisy Goodwin (1972–77), BBC television producer
- Rosalie Glynn Grylls, biographer, lecturer and Liberal Party politician
- Nancy Hiller (1973–77), furniture designer and cabinetmaker
- Sally Ann Howes (1937–38), actress
- Kathryn Hunter (1968–75), actress; winner of the Olivier Award, 1990
- Dame Rosalinde Hurley DBE (1948–50), Professor of Microbiology, Institute of Obstetrics and Gynaecology (1975–95)
- Tamara Ingram (1972–79), CEO, Saatchi & Saatchi
- Jameela Jamil, television presenter, actress
- Edith Lawrence, artist
- Caroline Lee-Johnson (1980–82), actress
- Professor Dame Hermione Lee (1963–5), biographer; Goldsmith Professor of English Literature, Oxford; President, Wolfson College, Oxford
- Sue Lees (1941–2002), academic, activist, feminist and writer
- Imogen Lloyd Webber (1988–1995), writer
- Anthea McIntyre (1968–1973), Conservative Party Member of the European Parliament for the West Midlands
- Katherine Mansfield (1903–6), writer
- Professor Albinia de la Mare OBE (1947–56), Professor of Palaeography, King's College, London
- Deborah Moggach (1959–62), novelist
- Margaret Morris (1972–4), dancer
- Christina Onassis (1967–68), shipping magnate; daughter of Aristotle Onassis
- Arabella Rosalind Hungerford Pollen (1977), fashion designer and writer
- Griselda Pollock (1964–6), art historian
- Jacqueline du Pré (1959), cellist
- Claudia Rosencrantz (1975–79), journalist; Controller of Entertainment, ITV; Commissioner of Who Wants to Be a Millionaire?, X Factor and I'm a Celebrity, Get Me Out of Here!; Director of Programming, Living TV; Director of Television, Virgin Media
- Anne Said (1925–30), artist
- Melissa Scott Miller (1971–77), urban landscape and portrait artist
- Gillian Sheen (1945–47), Olympic fencing gold medallist
- Sofka Skipwith (Princess Sofka Dolgorouky), Russian émigré, Communist, political prisoner, recipient of British Hero of the Holocaust honour
- Baroness Dame Mary Soames (1940), chairman, Royal National Theatre Board; daughter of Winston Churchill
- Barbara Thompson MBE (1955–62), musician
- Felicity Tree, baronetess and high-society figure
- Kathleen Tynan (1951–55), Canadian-British journalist and screenwriter
- Diana Barnato Walker (1928–34), writer and aviator
- Vanessa Walters (1988–1995), writer
- Sophie Ward (1976–83), actress
- Rebecca Wilcox (1992–1999), television presenter
- Suzannah Walker Wise (1983–89), actress
- Dame Anna Wintour (1960–63), editor-in-chief, (American) Vogue

== Twenty-First century ==
- Peaches Geldof, television personality
- Jameela Jamil, television personality
- Daisy Lowe, model
