= Helen Archdale =

Scottish suffragette and journalist (1876–1949)

- Born: Helen Alexander Russel; 25 August 1876; Nenthorn, Scotland
- Died: 8 December 1949 (aged 73); St John's Wood, London, England
- Education: St Leonard's School, St Andrews, Scotland; University of St Andrews
- Occupation: journalist
- Movement: Women's Social and Political Union
- Spouse: Theodore Montgomery Archdale (m. 1901)
- Children: Betty Archdale; Alexander Archdale
- Parents: Alexander Russel (father); Helen Evans (mother)

Helen Alexander Archdale (née Russel; 25 August 1876 – 8 December 1949) was a Scottish feminist, suffragette and journalist. Archdale was the Sheffield branch organiser for the Women's Social and Political Union and later its prisoners' secretary in London.

Active during the World War I, Archdale initiated a training farm for women agricultural workers in 1914. In 1917 she served as a clerical worker with Queen Mary's Army Auxiliary Corps, transferring in 1918 to the women's department of the Ministry of National Service.

== Biography ==
Helen Alexander Russel was born at Nenthorn, Berwickshire, Scotland. Her parents were Helen Evans (née Carter, 1834–1903), one of the Edinburgh Seven, the first group of women to enrol at a British university, and Alexander Russel (1814–1876), a Scottish journalist and editor of The Scotsman who supported Sophia Jex-Blake's attempts to secure medical education for women in Edinburgh.

She was educated at St Leonard's School, St Andrews, then at the University of St Andrews (1893–1894), where she was one of the first women undergraduates.

In 1901, she married Captain Theodore Montgomery Archdale, who was stationed in British India. Not much is known of her time in India, but she seems to have become estranged from her husband after the birth of their children. On returning to Scotland in 1908, Archdale immediately joined the Women's Social and Political Union (WSPU), becoming the Sheffield branch organiser in 1910 and finding employment with Adele Pankhurst as a live-in governess. In 1911, she hosted a mass 1911 census boycott party with Pankhurst, which was attended by 57 people including one invited male newspaper reporter. Archdale moved to London to take up the position of WSPU prisoners' secretary later in that year.

Archdale also worked as a writer and journalist. She worked in various capacities on the WSPU's publications The Suffragette from October 1912, and from 1915 she wrote for its successor, Britannia. She was the first editor of the political and literary weekly review Time & Tide (with the unspoken subtext "wait for no man"), founded in 1920 by Margaret Rhondda. In the 1930s she contributed articles to The Times, Daily News, Christian Science Monitor, and The Scotsman.

During the First World War, she was active in multiple positions, including at the Women's Department of the Ministry of National Service in the last year of the war. She started a training farm for women agricultural workers, served as a clerical worker with Queen Mary's Army Auxiliary Corps from 1917, and, in 1918, worked in the women's department of the Ministry of National Service.

== Political life ==
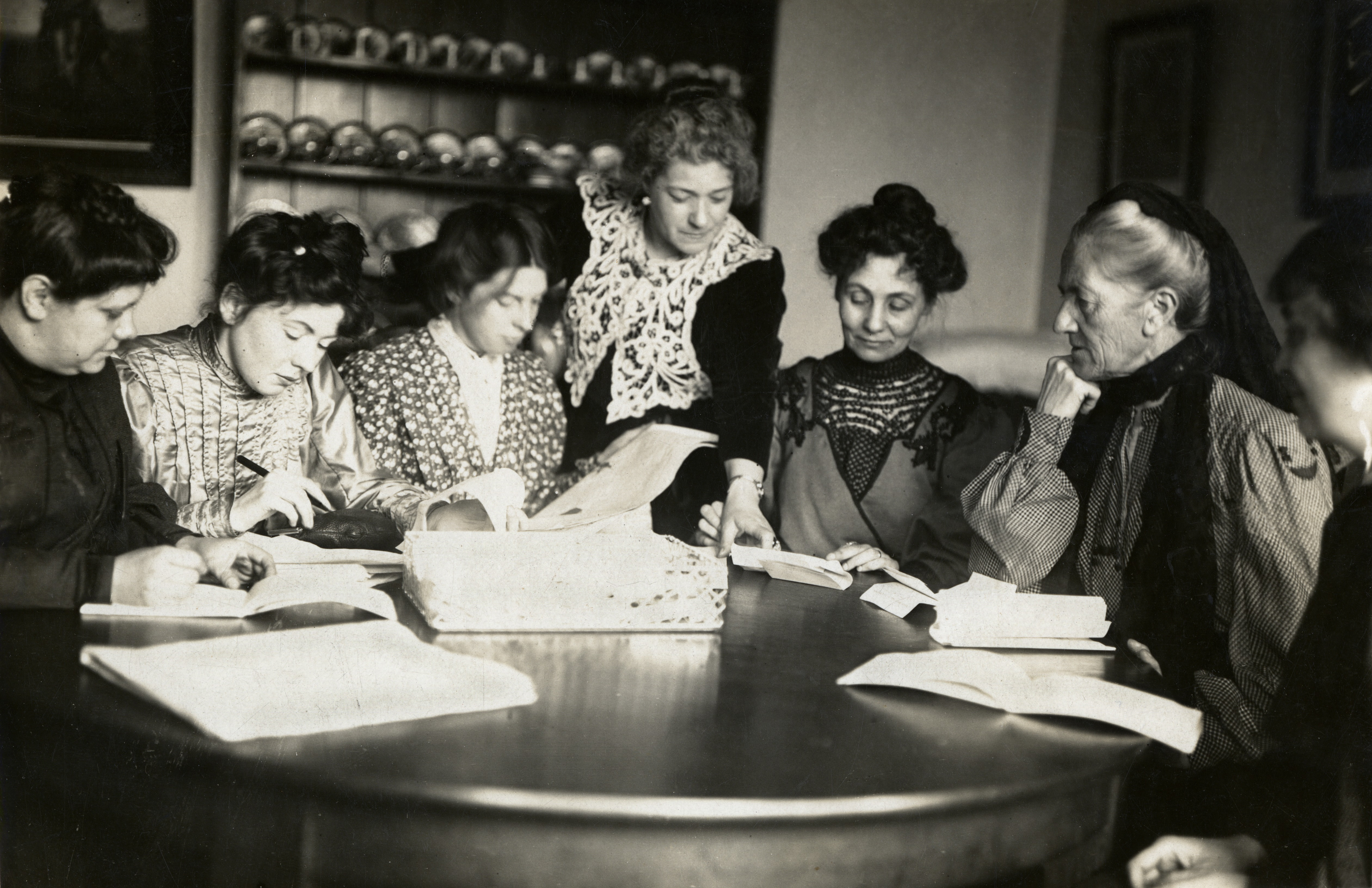
Meeting of Women's Social and Political Union (WSPU) leaders, Flora Drummond, Christabel Pankhurst, Annie Kenny, Emmeline Pankhurst, Charlotte Despard with two others. 1906 – 1907

Archdale took part in a WSPU demonstration in Edinburgh on 9 October 1909. Later that month she was arrested with Hannah Mitchell, Adela Pankhurst and Maud Joachim and Catherine Corbett in Dundee. They were convicted of breach of the peace after interrupting a meeting being held by the local MP, Winston Churchill, at which women had been excluded. Following their arrest, on 20 October, all went on hunger strike and were released after four days of the ten days imprisonment. The prison governor and medical supervisor assessed that due to her "configuration" Archdale "would be particularly difficult to feed forcibly".

In December 1911, Archdale received a sentence of two months' imprisonment for window-breaking at Whitehall. Her daughter, Betty Archdale (1907–2000), remembered collecting stones for her mother to use, and visiting her in Holloway Prison.

Archdale was the secretary, and later international secretary, of the Six Point Group, founded by Margaret Rhondda. The group's six aims were:

1. Satisfactory legislation on child assault 2. Satisfactory legislation for the widowed mother 3. Satisfactory legislation for the unmarried mother and her child 4. Equal rights of guardianship for married parents 5. Equal pay for teachers 6. Equal opportunities for men and women in the civil service

— Helen Archdale

In 1926, Archdale and Rhondda founded the Open Door Council with Chrystal Macmillan and Elizabeth Abbott. The Open Door Council was created to promote equal economic opportunities for women with a focus on economic emancipation. It opposed the extension of protective legislation for women, regarding such legislation as restrictive, and arguing that it effectively barred women from better-paid jobs such as mining. Archdale was also active in the international version, Open Door International, founded in 1929 with Chrystal Macmillan serving as president.

In 1927, Archdale began working in Geneva, lobbying for an Equal Rights Treaty at the League of Nations in the early 1930s. The League was the first international organisation whose principal mission was to maintain world peace. She became secretary of the Liaison Committee of Women's International Organisations, created in 1931 as a coalition to promote equal rights, disarmament and women's representation at the League. From 1929 to 1934 she worked to chair Equal Rights International, founded at The Hague, an organisation dedicated to promoting campaigning for equality of women with men in law and in the workplace. In the late 1930s, she was associated with the World Women's Party.

== Personal life ==
On 9 October 1901, Archdale married Captain, later Lieutenant-Colonel, Theodore Montgomery Archdale (1875–1918), who at the time was stationed in India. She spent her early married life in Lancashire and India. The couple had two sons and one daughter, two of whom were Alexander Archdale and Betty Archdale. Archdale appears to have been estranged from her husband from about 1913. According to her biographer, David Doughan, she had a relationship with Margaret Haig Thomas, 2nd Viscountess Rhondda: "By the early 1920s, she was sharing an apartment, and, together with her family, a country house (Stonepits, Kent) with Lady Rhondda."

Archdale was an adherent of Christian Science, which she credited with resolving her health issues. However, in later life she was "rejected by a Christian Science hospice because she had gone to a regular hospital after suffering a heart attack", violating the denomination's restrictions against seeking medical treatment.

Archdale died on 8 December 1949 at 17 Grove Court, St John's Wood, London.
