= Boyndie =

Coordinates: 57.6628°N 2.6041°W

Boyndie: Scottish Gaelic: Bòindidh
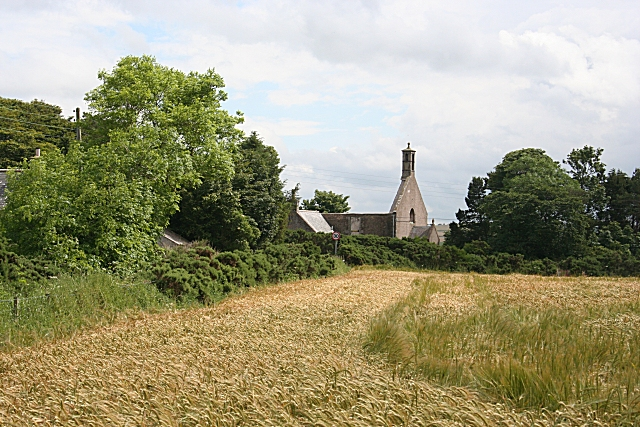
- The ruins of Boyndie Old Kirk

- Location within Aberdeenshire
- OS grid reference: NJ6463
- Council area: Aberdeenshire
- Lieutenancy area: Banffshire
- Country: Scotland
- Sovereign state: United Kingdom
- Police: Scotland
- Fire: Scottish
- Ambulance: Scottish
- UK Parliament: Aberdeenshire North and Moray East
- Scottish Parliament: Banffshire and Buchan Coast

Boyndie is a village in Aberdeenshire, Scotland.

== History ==
Boyndie was once home to RAF Banff Strike Wing, which played a pivotal role in protecting the area during World War II. Under the command of group captain the Hon. Max Aitken, six multi-national squadrons formed the Banff Strike Wing. Between September 1944 and May 1945, crews flying in Mosquito and Beaufighter aircraft targeted U-boats and surface vessels in the North Sea, causing the loss of thousands of tons of iron ore and other vital supplies. More than 80 airmen from the Wing gave their lives during the conflict. The airfield closed in 1946. In 1989, the R.A.F. Banff Strike Wing Memorial was erected on the Banff to Portsoy road near Portsoy.

== Attractions ==
The Grampian Kart Club operates an 850 metre kart racing track.

In 2004, Boyndie's old school building was converted into a training centre for people with special needs, and a visitor centre and restaurant serving the local community.

In 2006, Falck Renewables Wind Ltd built and commissioned the Boyndie Wind Farm, located on a disused World War II airfield. The wind farm has 8 turbines and when it's operating fully it generates 16.65 MW of electricity. The local community owns shares in the wind farm through the Boyndie Wind Farm Co-operative Ltd, which is the first wind farm co-operative in Scotland.

== Royal visit ==
On 11 November 2004 the Princess Royal visited Boyndie to tour the newly converted school building.

== Notable people ==
- Colin Fraser Barron (1893-1958), Canadian soldier, recipient of the Victoria Cross
- John Charles Grant Ledingham (1875-1944), pathologist and bacteriologist
- Mary Adamson Anderson Marshall (1837–1910), physician, member of the Edinburgh Seven
- George Ogilvie-Forbes (1891-1954), diplomat, humanitarian, recipient of the British Hero of the Holocaust award
- Thomas Ruddiman (1674-1757), classical scholar

== See also ==
- Banff Bay
