= Surgeons' Hall riot =

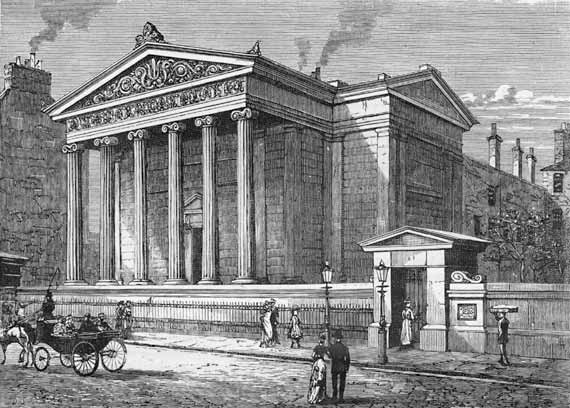
The Surgeons' Hall, site of the riots, circa 1890

The Surgeons' Hall Riot (18 November 1870) was a defining moment in the campaign of the Edinburgh Seven, a group of women fighting for the right to train and practice as doctors. It created a groundswell of support for the women's campaign, and also led to a well documented libel case against Sophia Jex-Blake.

== The riot ==
On 18 November 1870, the women were to attend an anatomy exam at Surgeons' Hall in Edinburgh. As they approached the building, they were confronted by a large crowd of students and several hundred onlookers. They were verbally abused and pelted with refuse, and the gate to the building was slammed in their face. They were eventually able to gain access to the hall — some resources state that access was facilitated by helpful janitorial staff, while others assert that the women were assisted by sympathetic male students. Several disruptive students were ejected from the building to allow the examination to proceed, however it was further interrupted when a live sheep — the pet sheep of the college known as "Poor 'Mailie" — was let loose in the room through a back door. After the close of the examination, a group of Irish students known as the "Irish Brigade" escorted the women out of the college in safety, although they were by this time well spattered with mud.

== Aftermath ==
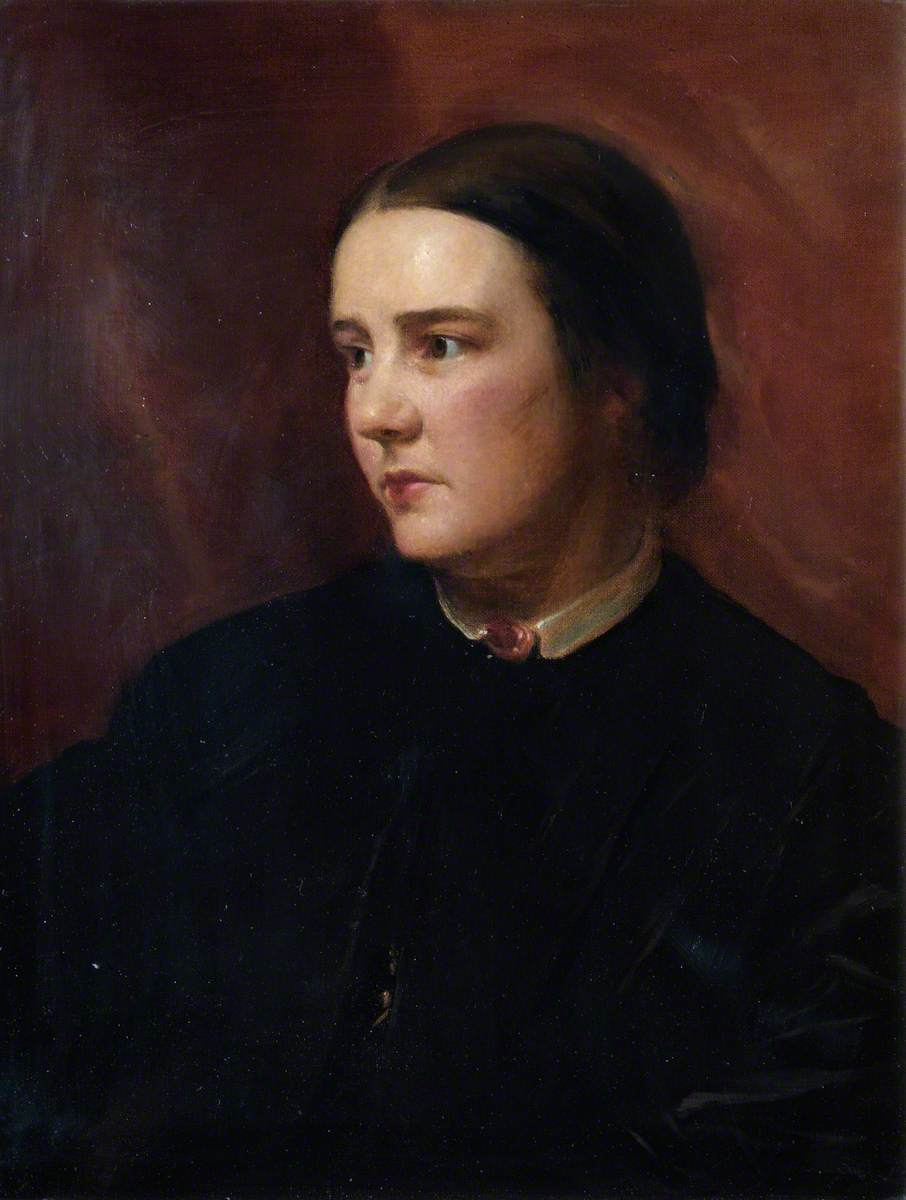
Portrait of Sophia Jex-Blake

The riot represented the culmination of months of harassment and bullying that the women faced during their studies; they had obscenities shouted at them in the streets, doors slammed in their face, and dirty or threatening letters were sent to them as part of this campaign of abuse. After the event, Sophia Jex-Blake was to claim that responsibility for inciting the riot lay with a student named Mr Craig, which led to his filing a defamation writ against her in January 1871. It has further been suggested that the students who instigated or took part in the riots did so with the support of medical faculty, particularly from Professor Robert Christison, for whom Craig worked as class assistant and who was explicitly opposed to the presence of women in medicine.

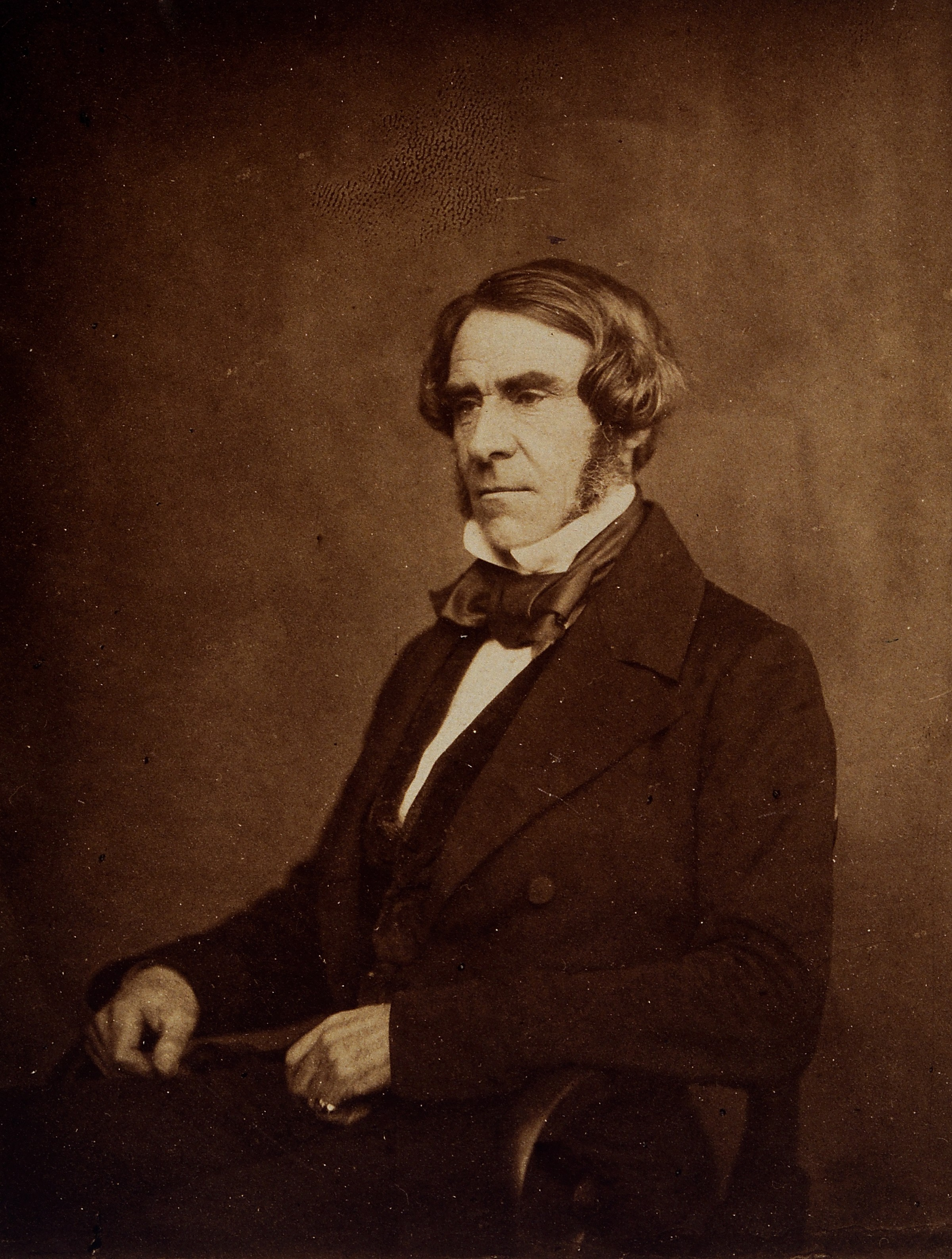
Sir Robert Christison, noted opponent of the Edinburgh Seven

Jex-Blake defended herself against Craig's writ of defamation in court with her colleagues serving as witnesses, and although the court found in favour of the claimant they awarded him just one farthing instead of the £1000 he had requested; the result has since been described as a victory for the Edinburgh Seven. Following the riots, the media condemned the actions of the rioters, with The Scotsman writing of the event:

...a certain class of medical students are doing their utmost to make sure that the name of medical student synonymous with all that is cowardly and degrading, it is imperative upon all...men...to come forward and express... their detestation of the proceedings which have characterised and dishonoured the opposition to ladies pursuing the study of medicine in Edinburgh...

The riots and their negative portrayal in the national media subsequently led not only to increased awareness of the Edinburgh Seven, but to a rise in public sympathy for the women and their fight to study medicine.

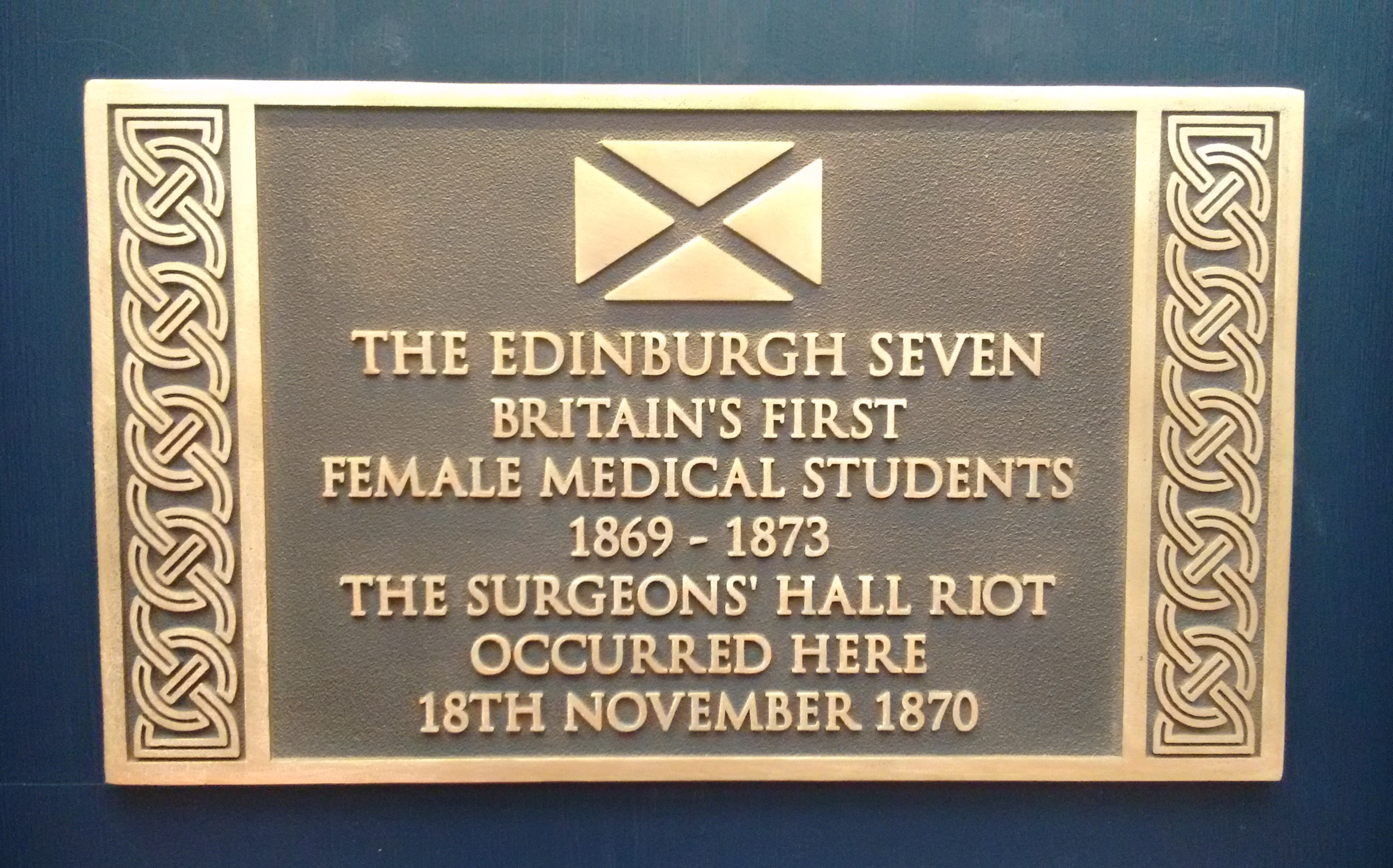
Historic Scotland plaque, unveiled in 2015 to commemorate the riot.

== Commemoration plaque ==
In September 2015 a Historic Scotland plaque commemorating the riot was unveiled at the University of Edinburgh. The nomination for the plaque was made by Learning Technology Senior Advisor Jo Spiller, of the University of Edinburgh. It was unveiled by Fiona Hyslop (Cabinet Secretary for Culture, Europe and External Affairs for the Scottish Government at the time), at a ceremony which was held at the University's Anatomical Museum.

== The riot in popular culture ==
In September 2015, the riot was included in Wendy Carle Taylor's musical show What a Riot! A Celebration of Surgeons' Hall in Story & Song, performed at the Surgeons' Hall Museum. The show was staged in celebration of the re-opening of the museum following refurbishment.
