= Catherine Corbett =

British suffragette (1869–1950)

- Born: Catherine Isobel Ida Vans Agnew; 1869
- Died: 1950 (aged 80–81); Surrey, England, UK
- Organisation: Women's Social and Political Union
- Known for: suffragette hunger striker
- Honours: Hunger Strike Medal for Valour

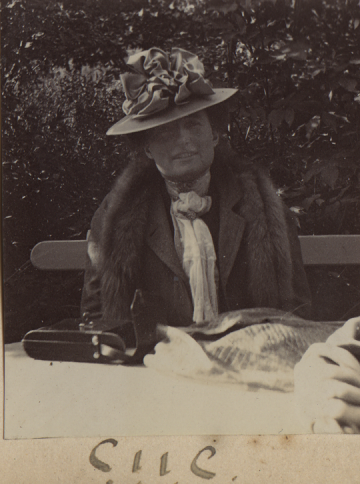
Catherine Corbett

Catherine Isobel Ida Corbett (née Vans Agnew; 1869–1950) was a British suffragette, one of those imprisoned and awarded the Hunger Strike Medal, for the cause of the Women's Social and Political Union.

== Life ==
Catherine Corbett was born Catherine Isobel Ida Vans Agnew in 1869 to George Vans Agnew from Wigtownshire, Scotland and Rosa Coppard Wilson. She had four brothers and one sister. In the family, at least, she was always known as Ida.

She married Frank Corbett on 22 October 1895 and was widowed in 1912.

Corbett was described as "a tall, dark and handsome lady".

== Suffrage activism ==
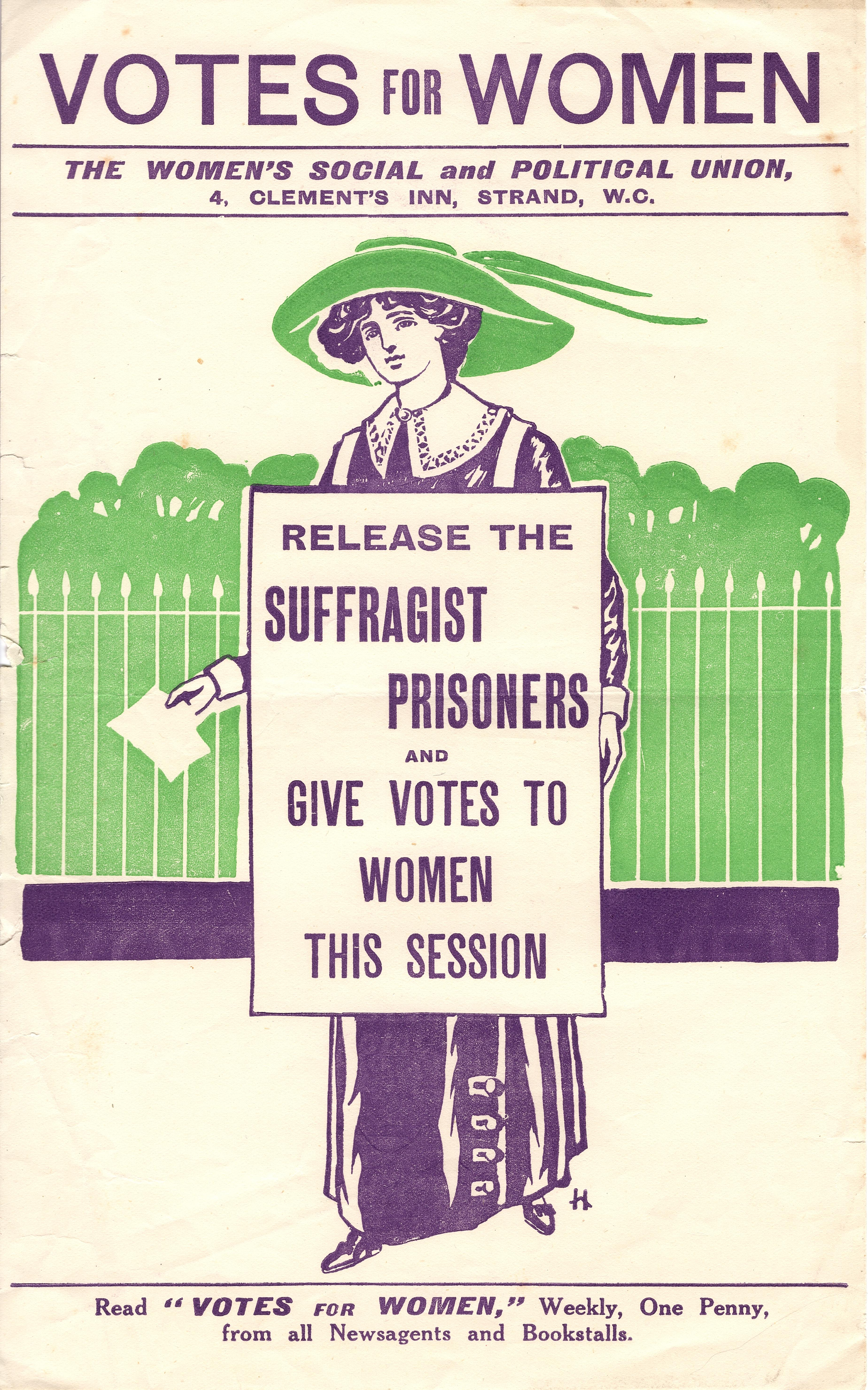
Votes for Women

She became active in the WSPU and she was arrested for obstruction and she and Olive Fargus were photographed in the Daily Mirror with a suffragette deputation on 24 February 1908, and then imprisoned for four weeks. She was also called 'an aristocrat supporter of the suffragette movement' in the Los Angeles Herald 25 February 1909.

Corbett was one of those seen pestering the Prime Minister H. H. Asquith at 10 Downing Street to receive their women's suffrage group to discuss legislation and she then informed the waiting press that the Prime Minister had said 'I think you are very silly".

The Museum of London has a photograph of these women walking along with the Prime Minister in Downing Street.

Corbett's involvement is referenced in the updated (2007) fictional Suffragette Sally, originally published in 1911 but based on real incidents.

Later the same year, in Dundee, Corbett was with Adela Pankhurst, Maud Joachim, Helen Archdale and Laura Evans and two Dundee men, Owen Clark and William Carr who supported their cause, to disrupt a meeting of Winston Churchill, MP in the Kinnaird Hall. Corbett and Helen Archdale made an impact by jumping off a tram and gathering local people around to 'rush' the barricades round the building, waving the WSPU colours and shouting 'Votes for Women'. The riot, supported by local Dundonians, lasted for three hours, attracting mounted police and the use of police batons was needed to clear the protestors and lock them in the basement.

Corbett said the protestors were all courageous and 'would not stop until they got the barricades down, they were glorious'. Churchill was quoted in the Dundee Courier describing them as 'a band of silly, neurotic, hysterical women'.

Corbett and the other women were arrested, imprisoned and went on hunger strike, but the two men were released without charge.

== Hunger strike but not force-fed ==
The governor of Dundee Gaol, James Crowe consulted the medical officer Dr. A.W. Stalker and decided not to follow the prison authorities recommendation to force-feed the women prisoners. Official correspondence between them and Edinburgh based Prison Commissioners and the Home Office in London, shows that they assessed the individual women leaders (mental and physical) capability to take this treatment before deciding what to do, and also 'owing to local feeling' thought it unlikely that they would be able to get the services of 'more than one or two nurses' to assist. Corbett was described as appearing older than her age, and 'with a rapid action of the heart and palpitation on movement.' This treatment by the local prison authorities differed from that in English prisons, and the press and Secretary of State for Scotland got involved in debating this point.

When Corbett and the others were released, they were greeted by 'General" Flora Drummond and suffragettes at the prison gate.

Corbett is listed in the Role of Honour of suffragette prisoners in the National Archives.

== Death ==
Corbett died in Surrey in 1950.
