= Mary Adamson Anderson Marshall =

Scottish physician (1837–1910)

- Born: Mary Adamson Anderson; January 17, 1837; Boyndie, Banffshire, Scotland
- Died: 1910 (aged 72–73); Watford, Hertfordshire, England
- Education: University of Edinburgh; Faculté de médecine de Paris
- Occupations: physician and a member of the Edinburgh Seven

Mary Adamson Marshall (née Anderson; 1837–1910) was a physician and a member of the Edinburgh Seven, the first women to study medicine at the University of Edinburgh.

== Early life and education ==
Mary Adamson Anderson was born on 17 January 1837, in Boyndie, Banffshire, Scotland. Her father was Reverend Alexander Govie Anderson, and her mother was Mary Gavin (née Mann). She was one of ten children, and her brother James George Skelton Anderson married physician, doctor and feminist Elizabeth Garrett Anderson.

Marshall began her medical training at the University of Edinburgh, and is considered one of the Edinburgh Seven alongside Emily Bovell, Matilda Chaplin, Helen Evans, Sophia Jex-Blake, Edith Pechey and Isabel Thorne. When in 1872 the University of Edinburgh decided that women medical students would not be awarded a degree, Anderson continued her studies in Paris, France.

In 1879, Marshall received her medical doctorate from the Faculté de médecine de Paris, where she wrote her thesis on mitral stenosis and its higher frequency in women than in men ("Du rétrécissement mitral: sa fréquence plus grande chez la femme que chez l'homme."). After receiving her doctorate, Marshall moved to Dublin to take her registration exams.

== Career ==
Marshall established a practice in London, and was later a senior physician at the New Hospital for Women, Marylebone.

== Personal life ==
Marshall's husband was solicitor Claud Marshall, of Renfrewshire. Her husband died after only two months of marriage, in 1871, when she was pregnant. Her son died in infancy, living for just a few days after his birth.

In 1895, Marshall moved to Cannes, France, but returned to England due to ill health. Marshall died from pneumonia in 1910 in Watford, Hertfordshire, England.

== Awards and honours ==
The Royal College of Surgeons of Edinburgh unveiled a plaque commemorating the Edinburgh Seven's achievements in March 2018.

The University of Edinburgh allowed women to graduate in 1894 and the first doctors graduated in 1896. The Edinburgh Seven were awarded the posthumous honorary MBChB at the University of Edinburgh’s McEwan Hall on Saturday 6 July 2019. The degrees were collected on their behalf by a group of current students at Edinburgh Medical School. The graduation was the first of a series of events planned by the University of Edinburgh to commemorate the achievements and significance of the Edinburgh Seven.
