= William Allen Sturge =

English physician and archaeologist

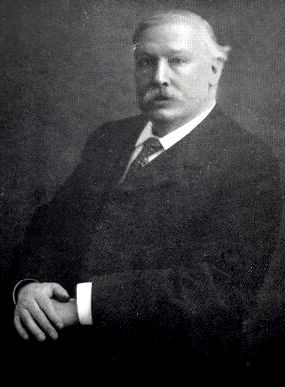
William A. Sturge

William Allen Sturge (1850 – 27 March 1919) was an English physician and archaeologist born in Bristol. His first wife was Emily Bovell, one of the "Edinburgh Seven". He also worked as a personal physician for Queen Victoria, and was awarded with Royal Victorian Order.

== Career ==
Sturge was born in Bristol into a Quaker family. His father, William was a land surveyor and his mother was Charlotte Allen. Five of his sisters campaigned for women's higher education including Elizabeth and Emily Sturge.

=== Career in medicine ===
After receiving his medical degree in 1873 from University College in London, Sturge became resident medical officer and later registrar at the National Hospital for Paralysis and Epilepsy. In 1876 he went to Paris to study neurology with Jean-Martin Charcot (1825–1893), and pathology with Jean Alfred Fournier (1832–1915). He met his wife in Paris. She was the physician Emily Bovell., They returned to London together, marrying on 27 September at St Saviour's Church in Paddington. Thereafter they set up a practice together in Wimpole Street, his wife renewed her relationship with Queen's College, lecturing on physiology and hygiene, and running ambulance classes for ladies. Sturge was a strong supporter of his wife's career, and the cause of women's medical education in general.

He was the pathologist at the Royal Free Hospital. In 1879 he described a disorder in a six-year-old child which would later be called the Sturge–Weber syndrome. It is co-named with another English physician, Frederick Parkes Weber (1863-1962). This disease is a congenital disorder which affects the brain, eyes and skin. The disease is characterized by a port-wine nevi on the scalp along the distribution of the trigeminal nerve, combined with glaucoma and intracranial vascular abnormalities.

From 1880–1907, Sturge practiced medicine in Nice, and was personal physician to Queen Victoria and her family members when they came to the French Riviera. The Queen awarded Sturge with an MVO (Member of the Victorian Order), which is a decoration reserved for people who have rendered personal service to the Royal Family. Sturge's wife died of a lung condition in 1885 and was buried in Nice. Sturge created a laboratory at Queen’s College Harley Street which he named the Bovell-Sturge laboratory.

=== Career in archaeology ===
In 1907, Sturge retired from medicine, and dedicated his time to archaeology. His interest was in collecting Greek and Etruscan pottery, along with Paleolithic and Neolithic relics. His personal museum in Suffolk numbered thousands of flint implements; presently this collection can be found in the British Museum. His collection of Greek amphorae is housed in the Toronto Museum.

In 1908, he was co-founder and president of the 'East Anglian Society of Prehistorians', which in 1911 was named the 'Prehistoric Society of East Anglia.' The first honorary secretary was William George Clarke. Other founding members were W.A. Dutt and H.H. Halls. Within twenty years this society developed into a national organisation.

He died in Icklingham, Suffolk on 27 March 1919.
