= Helen Evans =

Helen de Lacey Evans (née Carter; 1833/1834 – 4 October 1903) was the fifth member of the Edinburgh Seven, a group of women who enrolled at the University of Edinburgh in 1869, and who sought to qualify as physicians. She married the editor of The Scotsman, Alexander Russel and was mother to the suffragist and feminist campaigner Helen Archdale.

== Early life ==
Helen Carter was born in Athy, Ireland in either 1833 or 1834, one of seven children. Her parents were Helen Gray and Major Henry Carter, 73rd Regiment Bengal Native Infantry.

In 1854, in Shimla, India, she married cavalry officer Henry John Delacy Evans of the Bengal Horse Artillery Regiment. Together they had a daughter, Helen, who died in infancy in 1857. She was widowed prior to her enrolment at Edinburgh in 1869.

== Later life ==
In 1869 Evans joined a group of women, led by Sophia Jex-Blake, who became known as the Edinburgh Seven (Mary Anderson, Emily Bovell, Matilda Chaplin, Helen Evans, Sophia Jex-Blake, Edith Pechey and Isabel Thorne) who sought to earn a degree in medicine at the University of Edinburgh. They were the first women undergraduates in any British university.

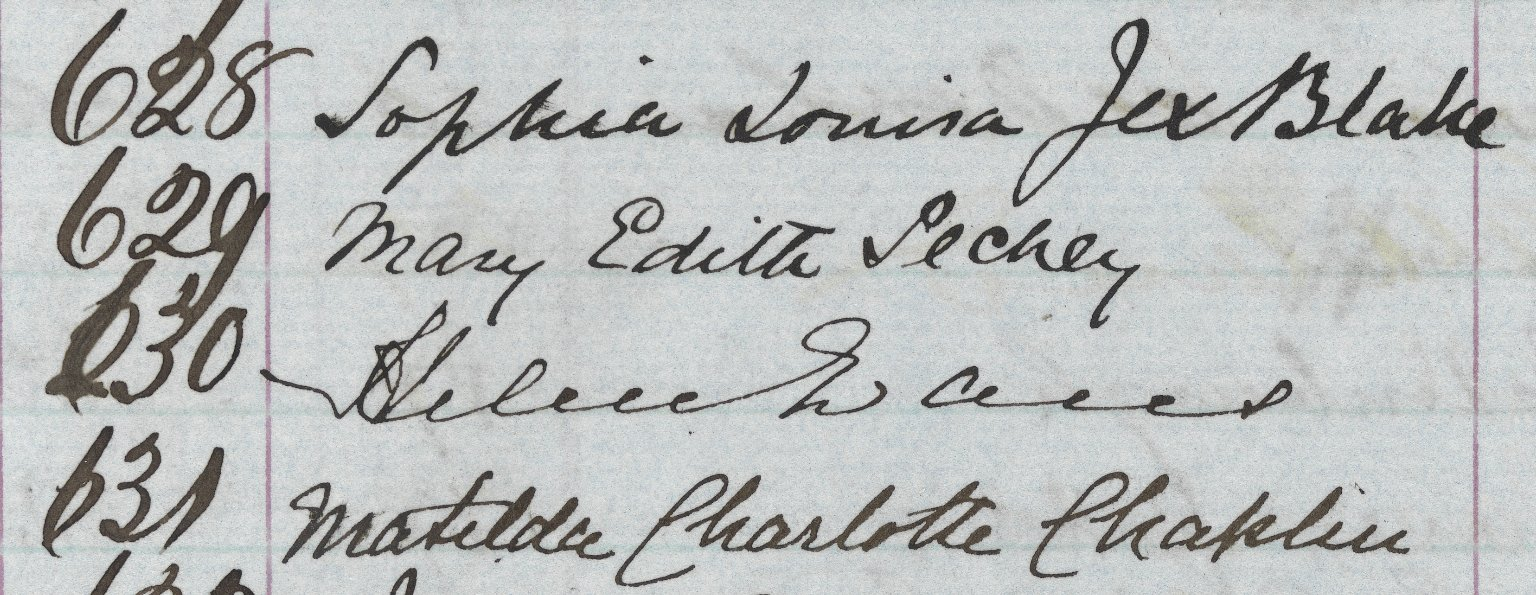
Matriculation Signatures: Sophia Jex-Blake, Mary Pechey, Helen Evans, Matilda Chaplin

She proved to be an able student and with other members of the group she passed her matriculation examinations with distinction.

In November 1871 she married Alexander Russel, editor of The Scotsman newspaper, a strong supporter of Sophia Jex-Blake and the women medical students. After her marriage Evans did not complete her studies but her link with Edinburgh continued, and she remained friends with Jex-Blake.

Evans was active in promoting the care of women by women doctors. She also took a keen interest in education being "one of the first lady members of St Andrews School Board, a position she held for 15 years".(Edinburgh Evening News, 5 Oct 1903). In addition to this she was a member of the council for St Leonards School for Girls (now co-ed).

In July 1876 her husband died suddenly from a heart attack leaving her with three children and was unable to return to study.

When Sophia Jex-Blake began the process of founding another medical school for women in Edinburgh, Helen, together with Dr George Balfour, Dr Agnes McLaren, Mr Miller-White, Dr Heron Watson and Ursula Du Pre, formed an executive committee to find suitable premises. In 1900 and 1901 along with Du Pre she was a vice president of the committee of the Edinburgh Hospital and Dispensary for Women and Children, the hospital in Whitehouse Loan and the dispensary in Torphichen Place. The hospital was the only one in Edinburgh to provide medical and surgical care to women by women doctors. It provided privacy, a homely atmosphere and care to women who were unable to afford private nursing home fees.

== Death ==
Evans died in St Andrews, Scotland on 4 October 1903 after a surgical procedure. She was buried in the Dean Cemetery, Edinburgh beside her husband Alexander Russel.

== Recognition ==
The Edinburgh Seven were awarded the posthumous honorary MBChB at the University of Edinburgh’s McEwan Hall on Saturday 6 July 2019. The degrees were collected on their behalf by a group of current students at Edinburgh Medical School. The graduation was the first of a series of events planned by the University of Edinburgh to commemorate the achievements and significance of the Edinburgh Seven.

== Relatives ==
- Alexander Russel (1832–1915), 2nd Husband, Editor of The Scotsman newspaper
- Helen Archdale, (1876- 1949) Daughter, Feminist and writer
- Michael Russel, (1874–1900) Son
