= Edith Pechey =

Doctor, women's rights campaigner (1845–1908)

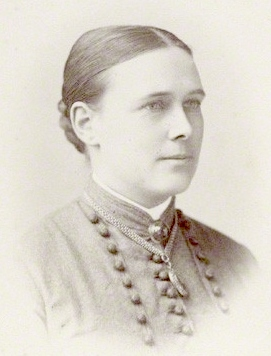
- Born: Mary Edith Pechey; 7 October 1845; Langham, England
- Died: 14 April 1908 (aged 62); Folkestone, England
- Other name: Edith Pechey-Phipson
- Education: University of Edinburgh
- Occupations: Physician, Suffragette
- Spouse: Herbert Musgrave Phipson (m. 1889)

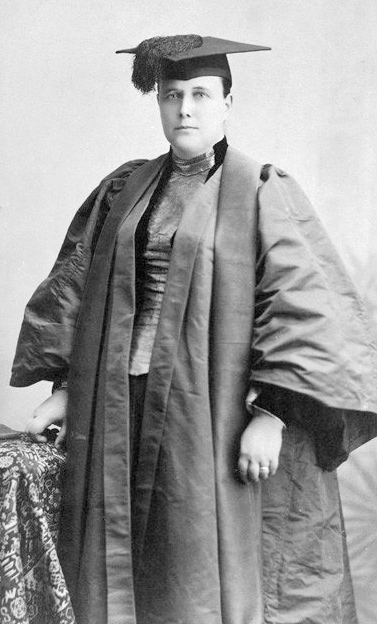
Edith Pechey

Mary Edith Pechey (7 October 1845 – 14 April 1908) was one of the first women medical doctors in the United Kingdom and a campaigner for women's rights. She spent more than 20 years in India as a senior doctor at a women's hospital and was involved in a range of social causes.

== Family and Edinburgh ==
Mary Edith Pechey was born in Langham, Essex, to Sarah (née Rotton), a lawyer's daughter who, unusually for a woman of her generation, had studied Greek, and William Pechey, a Baptist minister with an MA in theology from the University of Edinburgh. After being educated by her parents, she worked as governess and teacher until 1869. Lutzker notes that "Her mother also was competent in Greek and other studies and both parents possessed - along with their questing nonconformist minds - a deep and serious love of learning."

== The Campaign to study medicine ==
After Sophia Jex-Blake's sole application to study medicine at the University of Edinburgh was turned down, she advertised in The Scotsman for more women to join her. The second letter she received was from Edith Pechey. In her letter, Pechey wrote:

"Do you think anything more is requisite to ensure success than moderate abilities and a good share of perseverance? I believe I may lay claim to these, together with a real love of the subjects of study, but as regards any thorough knowledge of these subjects at present, I fear I am deficient in most."

Despite her concerns, Pechey became one of the Edinburgh Seven, the first seven female undergraduate medical students at any British university, others being Mary Anderson, Emily Bovell, Matilda Chaplin, Helen Evans, Sophia Jex-Blake and Isabel Thorne. She proved her academic ability by achieving the top grade in the chemistry exam in her first year of study, making her eligible to receive a Hope Scholarship.

== The Hope Scholarship ==
Forty years previously, Professor Hope, then Professor of Chemistry, had instituted annual awards known as the Hope Scholarships. The four students who achieved the highest marks sitting the first-term examination in chemistry for the first time were to be granted free use of the facilities of the University laboratory during the next term. Edith Pechey came top of this group and therefore had first claim to a Hope Scholarship.

Crum Brown, the Professor of Chemistry, was concerned that awarding the scholarship to a woman would provoke a backlash from the male students, who had grown increasingly hostile when they saw that women were capable of outstripping them in competitive examinations. He had also noticed that, as the term had progressed, many of his respected colleagues in the medical faculty began to express resentment of the presence of women in the University.

He therefore decided to award the scholarships to male students who achieved lower grades than Pechey. The cited reason was "that women are not part of the University class, because they are separately taught."

== Appeal to Senate and 'Strawberry Jam Labels' ==
Having used the matter of separate classes as a reason not to award the scholarship to Pechey, Crum Brown felt unable to issue the women with the usual certificates of attendance at his chemistry classes. Instead, he gave them credit for attending a ″ladies″ class in the University. Only the standard certificates met the Faculty's requirements for the medical degree; the Professor's 'Strawberry Jam Labels', as Sophia Jex-Blake referred to them were useless.

The women appealed to the Senatus Academicus. Edith Pechey stated her claim to a scholarship and the other women asked that they be granted the standard certificates for their chemistry classes. The Senatus met on 9 April 1870 and, after some debate, ruled in favour of the women on the certificates but against them on the Hope Scholarship.

== The Edinburgh Campaign gains national attention ==
The episode of the Hope Scholarship had important consequences. The publicity it was given in newspapers throughout the UK drew the attention of the public to the difficulties being encountered by the small group of women studying medicine at the University of Edinburgh. Almost all the accounts were favourable to the women's cause.

The Times said:

"[Miss Pechey] has done her sex a service, not only by vindicating their intellectual ability in an open competition with men, but still more by the temper and courtesy with which she meets her disappointments."

The Spectator was satirical:

"To make women attend a separate class, for which they have to pay, we believe, much higher fees than usual, and then argue that they are out of the pale of competition because they do so, is, indeed, too like the captious schoolmaster who first sent a boy into the corner and then whipped him for not being in his seat."

== Early years as a doctor ==
In 1873 the women had to give up the struggle to graduate at Edinburgh. One of Pechey's next steps was writing to the College of Physicians in Ireland to ask them to let her take exams leading to a license in midwifery. She worked for a time at the Birmingham and Midland Hospital for Women, apparently on the strength of her testimonials and successful studies, despite the lack of an official qualification. There, she had taken over from Louisa Atkins, the country's first woman House Surgeon. Next she went to the University of Bern, passed her medical exams in German at the end of January 1877 and was awarded an MD with a thesis 'Upon the constitutional causes of uterine catarrh'. At that time the Irish College began licensing women doctors, and Pechey passed its exams in Dublin in May 1877.

For the next six years Pechey practised medicine in Leeds, involving herself in women's health education and lecturing on a number of medical topics, including nursing. She was invited to give the inaugural address when the London School of Medicine for Women opened. In 1880, Pechey took a trip to Egypt. Pechey took a vacation on the river Nile in a dahabeah (wooden boat) and turned this experience into a paper which was published in the Sanitary Record in 1880. Partly in reaction to the exclusion of women by the International Medical Congress she set up the Medical Women's Federation of England and in 1882 was elected president. George A. Kittredge, an American businessman in Bombay had started a fund, "medical women for India", to bring women doctors from England to work in India where male doctors were not permitted to attend to women. Kittredge was in search of suitable doctors and Elizabeth Garrett Anderson suggested that Pechey may be interested. She wrote to Pechey on the idea of working at Bombay (now Mumbai) as Senior Medical Officer (SMO) at the Cama Hospital for Women and Children. In 1883 Kittredge met Pechey in Paris, and suggested that she would be ideal for the position of SMO at a new hospital being planned by P.H. Cama, a Parsi philanthropist in Bombay.

== India ==
Arriving on 12 December 1883 at Bombay, she quickly learned Hindi. As well as her work at the Cama Hospital she was in charge of the Jaffer Sulleman Dispensary for women, and after a few years had successfully initiated a training programme for nurses at Cama. She worked to counteract prejudices against women, making the case for equal pay and opportunity for female medical workers. She also campaigned for wider social reform, and against child marriage. She often gave lectures on education and training for women and was involved with the Alexandra Native Girls' Educational Institution. Various learned societies invited her to be their first woman member, including the senate of the University of Bombay and the Royal Asiatic Society. In 1888, she was on the managing committee of the Bombay Natural History Society.

She met Herbert Musgrave Phipson (1849–1936), a reformer, wine merchant and a founding secretary of the Bombay Natural History Society as well as the "medical women for India" fund, marrying him in March 1889. She later used the surname Pechey-Phipson. Five years later, as a result of diabetes and general ill health, she retired from hospital work but continued for some time with her private practice which served the Bombay elite. In 1896, when bubonic plague struck the city, she played her part in public health measures, and criticisms she made of the way the crisis was handled proved to be influential in managing an outbreak of cholera. She also helped sponsor an advanced education for Rukhmabai, who became one of the first Indian women to practice medicine.

== Later years ==
Pechey-Phipson and her husband returned to England in 1905 and she was soon involved in the suffrage movement, representing Leeds suffragists at an International Women's Suffrage Alliance congress in Copenhagen in 1906. She was at the forefront of the Mud March demonstration organised by the National Union of Women's Suffrage Societies in 1907, but was becoming ill and soon needed treatment for breast cancer. Her surgeon was May Thorne, daughter of Pechey-Phipson's student friend Isabel Thorne.

She died from cancer while in a diabetic coma on 14 April 1908 at her home in Folkestone, Kent. Her husband set up a scholarship at the London School of Medicine for Women in her name which was granted regularly up to 1948. In India, her name continued until 1964 at the Pechey-Phipson Sanatorium for Women and Children at Nasik, Maharashtra.

== Recognition ==
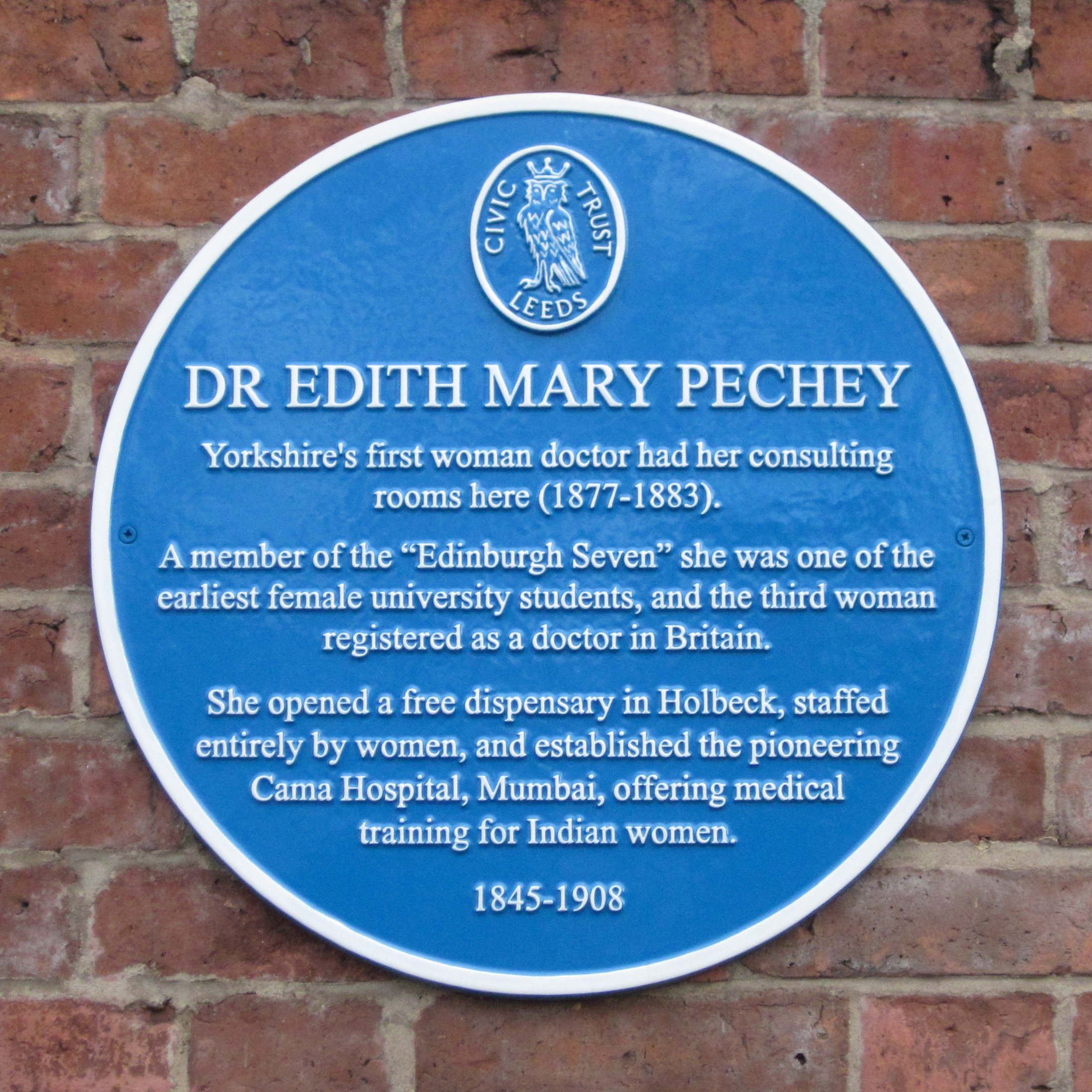

The Edinburgh Seven were awarded the posthumous honorary MBChB at the University of Edinburgh’s McEwan Hall on Saturday, 6 July 2019. The degrees were collected on their behalf by a group of current students at Edinburgh Medical School. The graduation was the first of a series of events planned by the University of Edinburgh to commemorate the achievements and significance of the Edinburgh Seven.

A Blue Plaque was unveiled in July 2021 at 8, Park Square, Leeds, where Edith Pechey's practice was located.

On 7 October 2022 (the 177th anniversary of her birth) a blue plaque was unveiled in her memory at the Langham Community Centre, in Essex, her birth place.

Her name is one of those featured on the sculpture Ribbons, unveiled in 2024.

== See also ==
- History of feminism
- List of suffragists and suffragettes
