= Matilda Chaplin Ayrton =

English physician (1846–1883)

Matilda Ayrton
- Born: Matilda Charlotte Chaplin; 22 June 1846; Honfleur, France
- Died: 19 July 1883 (aged 37); 68 Sloane Street, Chelsea, London, England
- Resting place: Brompton Cemetery
- Spouse: William Edward Ayrton (m. 1871)
- Children: Edith Ayrton
- Relatives: Israel Zangwill (son-in-law)

Matilda Charlotte Ayrton (née Chaplin; 22 June 1846 – 19 July 1883) was an English physician. She studied medicine in London, Edinburgh and Paris, pursuing higher studies at the latter's universities, and is one of the Edinburgh Seven, the first seven matriculated undergraduate female students at a British university. She travelled to Japan, where she opened a school for midwives, and was an author of anthropological studies.

== Early life ==
Ayrton was born Matilda Charlotte Chaplin on 22 June 1846 in Honfleur, France to English parents John Clarke Chaplin (c. 1805–1856), a solicitor, and Matilda Adriana (née Ayrton; 1817–1899). The family lived in Edgbaston, where several of her elder siblings were born, and returned to England shortly after her birth. She was baptised at St George's Church, Edgbaston in December 1846 before the family moved to Kensington.

== Education and career ==
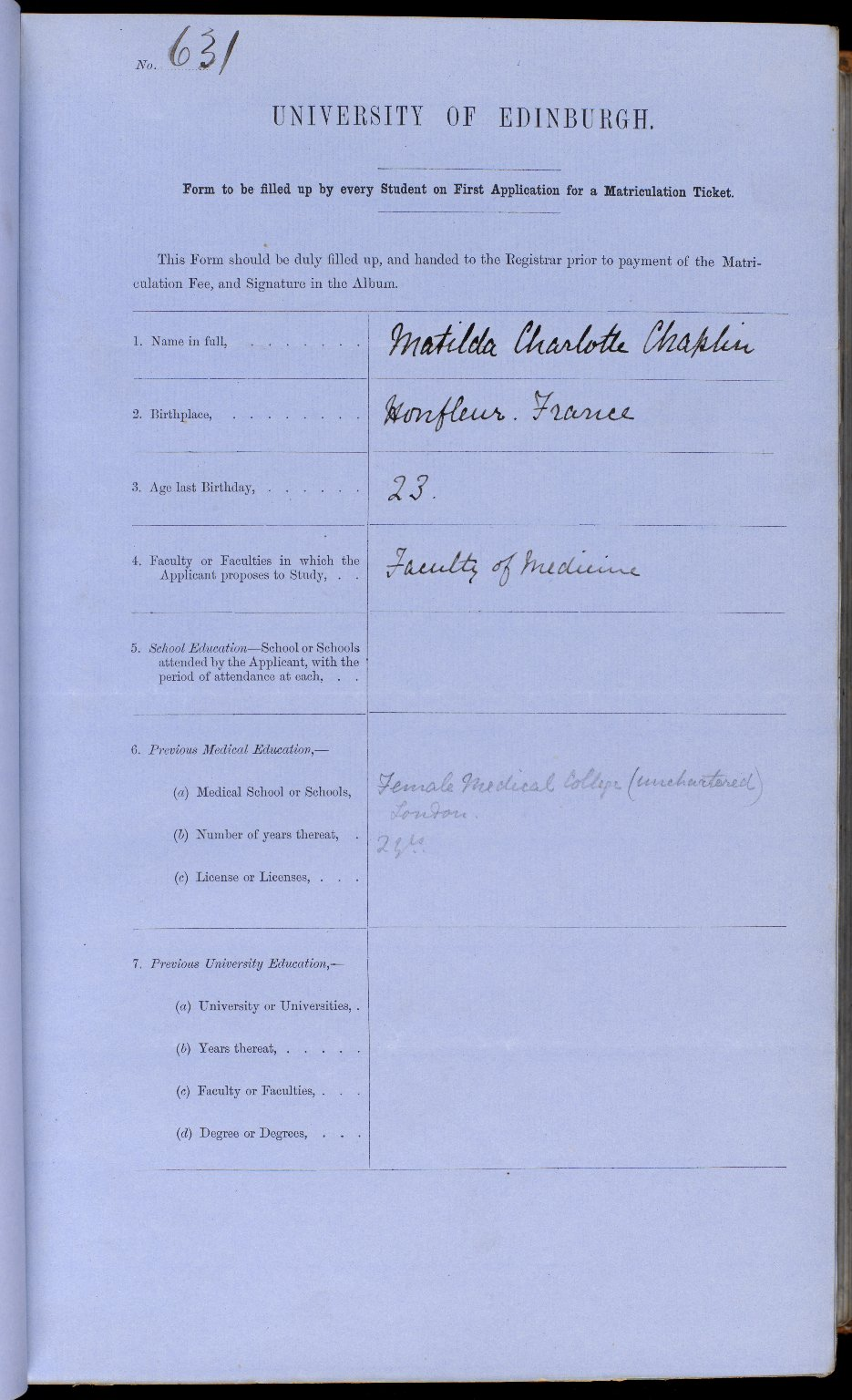
Matriculation Record, Matilda Chaplin. University of Edinburgh Centre for Research Collections

After beginning her studies in art she commenced the study of medicine in 1867, and continued to do so until her death. She spent two years at the Ladies' Medical College, and having passed the preliminary examination at Apothecaries' Hall in 1869, she presented herself for the later examination, but was refused admission on the ground of her gender.

Recognised as one of the heroic 'seven against Edinburgh' women, also known as the Edinburgh Seven (Mary Anderson, Emily Bovell, Helen Evans, Sophia Jex-Blake, Edith Pechey, Isabel Thorne as well as Chaplin), she eventually matriculated at the University of Edinburgh, but was barred from instruction in higher branches of medicine. Legal intervention allowed her to gain high honours in anatomy and surgery at the extramural examinations held in 1870 and 1871 at Surgeons' Hall, Edinburgh, before a judgment in 1872 finally prohibited women students.

In 1871, when she found the chief medical classes in England and Scotland closed to her, she resolved to complete her education at Paris, where every facility was afforded her. The University of Paris recognised her abilities by bestowing upon her the degrees of Bachelier ès-Sciences and Bachelier ès-Lettres. During her studies, Chaplin maintained connection with Edinburgh, attending some of the classes open to her there.

In 1872, she married her cousin, the noted scientist William Edward Ayrton, an Edinburgh student, and a distinguished pupil of Sir William Thomson. Early in the following year, she obtained a certificate in midwifery from the London Obstetric Society, the only medical qualification then obtainable by women in England. Shortly afterwards she accompanied her husband to Japan, where he had been appointed to a professorship in the Imperial College of Engineering in Tokyo.

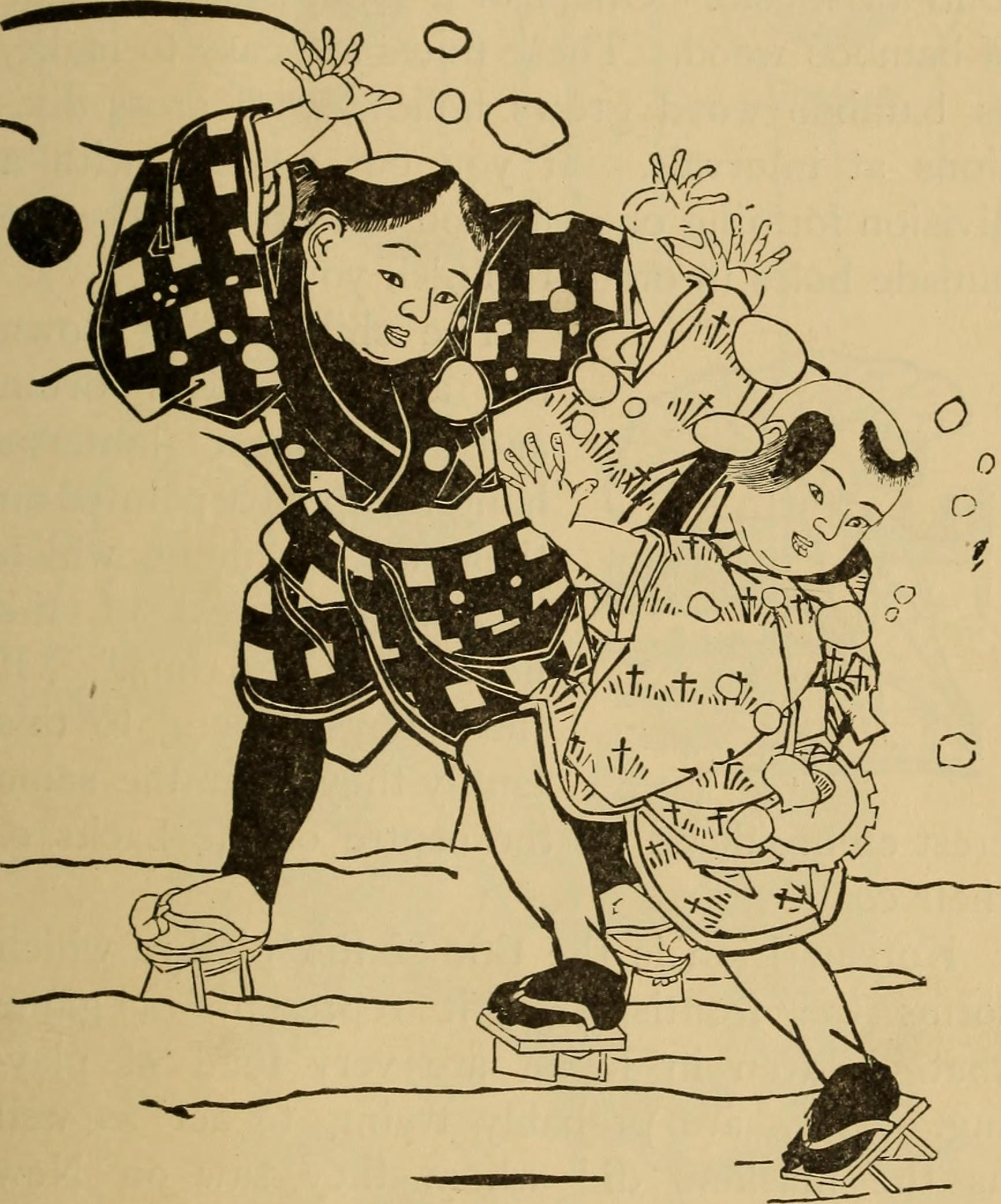
Child Life in Japan

While in Japan, she pursued anthropological researches, and opened a school for Japanese midwives, in which she lectured with the aid of an interpreter. In 1877, she developed tuberculosis forcing her return to Europe. In 1879, she took the MD at Paris, and presented as her thesis the results of her Japanese studies, which were printed under the title of Recherches sur les dimensions générales et sur le développement du corps chez les Japonais (Paris, 1879). In 1880, she became a licentiate of the King and Queen's College of Physicians in Ireland, where she was the only female candidate at the examinations. She headed the pass lists in medicine and midwifery. In 1880, she lived in London, chiefly studying diseases of the eye at the Royal Free Hospital.

As a result of her tuberculosis, her health continued to decline and for the next two winters, she continued her studies abroad in a warmer climate. The first year winter, she spent at the hospital of Algiers and then second at the physiological laboratory at Montpellier.

=== Author ===
The Dictionary of National Biography records: "From the time of her journey to Japan Mrs. Ayrton contributed to The Scotsman and other periodicals a large number of articles on very various topics, including Japanese politics and customs, and the educational problems of the West."

She took a keen interest in the Japanese people and never wearied of studying them and their country. She became more and more interested in the home life of the Japanese and in the pictures and stories which delighted the children of the Mikado's Empire. After her return to England, she wrote a book entitled Child Life in Japan which was illustrated from her own sketches.

== Personal life and legacy ==
Ayrton always took a lively interest in attempts to improve the educational opportunities and social position of women. She actively aided the establishment of a club for women students in Paris, and helped to organise the Somerville Club for women in London."

Chaplin and Ayrton's daughter was the feminist and author Edith Ayrton, wife of Israel Zangwill and mother of Oliver Zangwill.

On 19 July 1883, Ayrton died from tuberculosis at her home on 68 Sloane Street, Chelsea, aged 37.

The Edinburgh Seven were awarded the posthumous honorary MBChB at the University of Edinburgh's McEwan Hall on Saturday 6 July 2019. The degrees were collected on their behalf by a group of current students at Edinburgh Medical School. The graduation was the first of a series of events planned by the University of Edinburgh to commemorate the achievements and significance of the Edinburgh Seven.

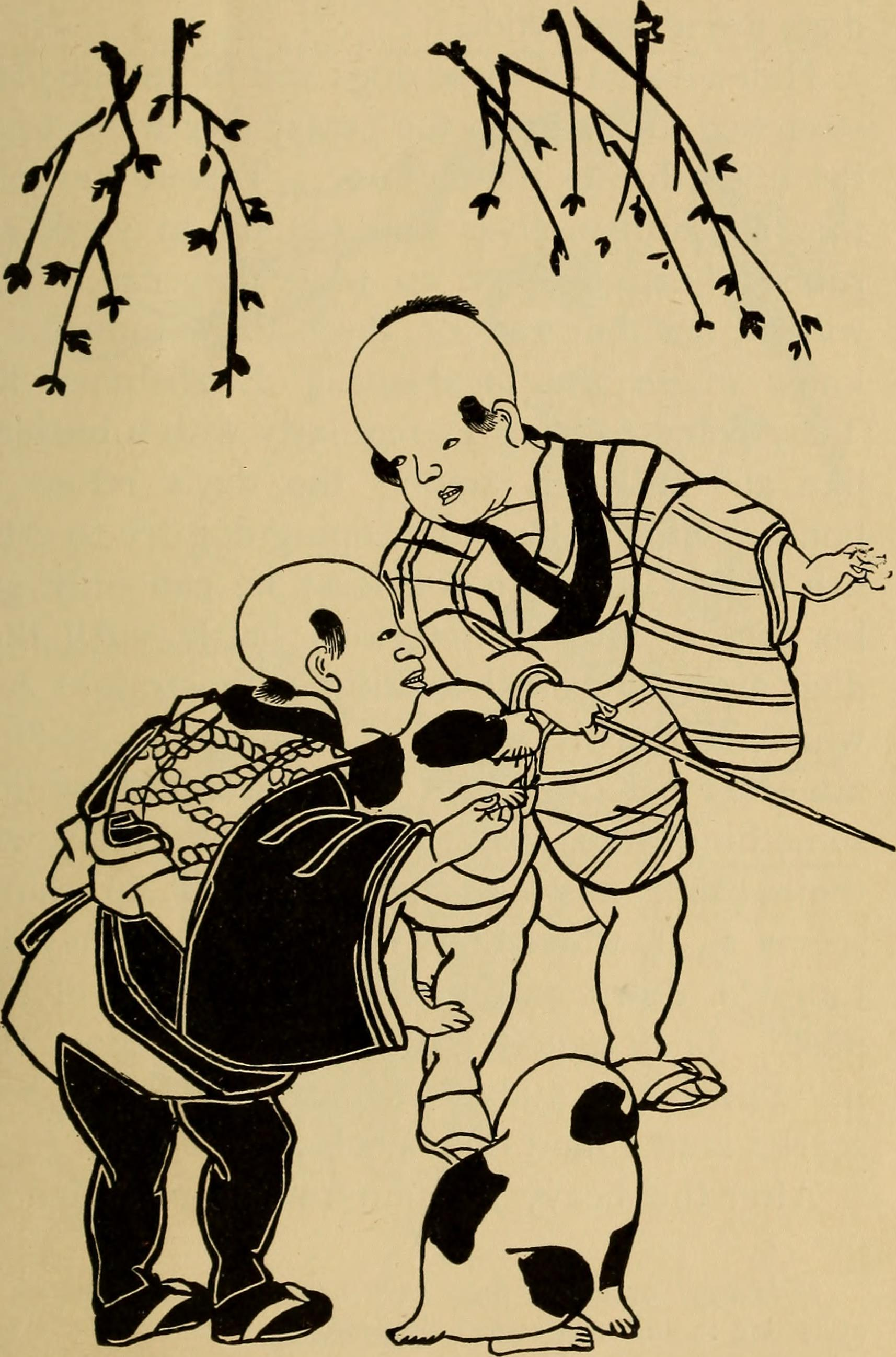
Child life in Japan
