= Emily Bovell =

Scottish physician (1841-1885)

- Born: 21 February 1841; London, England
- Died: April 1885 (aged 43–44); Nice, France
- Education: Queen's College, London; University of Edinburgh
- Occupation: Physician
- Known for: member of the Edinburgh Seven; Officier des Ordre des Palmes Académiques (1880)

Signature
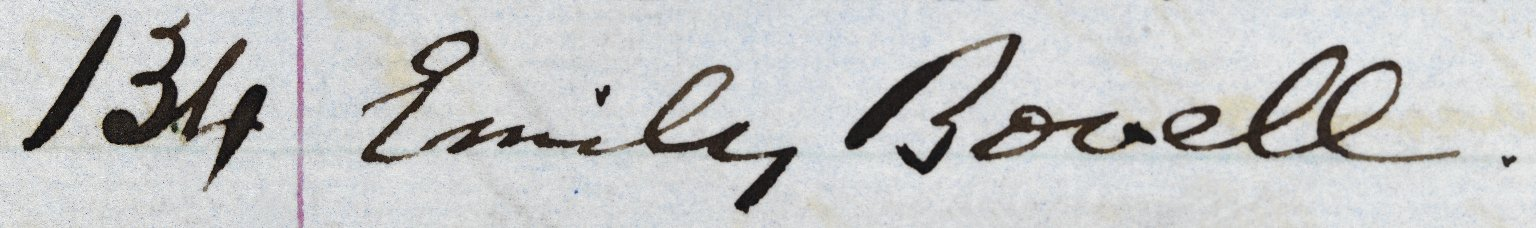

Emily Bovell (21 February 1841–April 1885) was a Scottish physician and credited as one of the original members of the Edinburgh Seven. After qualification she worked at the New Hospital for Women in Marylebone Road, London and in Paris. The French government award her the Officier des Ordre des Palmes Académiques for services to medicine. Her husband was the neurologist William Allen Sturge.

== Early life and education ==
Bovell was born on 21 February 1841 in London, the daughter of Sarah Louisa (née Jones) and John Roach Bovell (1803–1852). She was educated at Queens College, London, where she stayed on for a time as a mathematical tutor. Other contemporary students of Queen's College include Sophia Jex-Blake, who she later studied with at the University of Edinburgh.

Although credited as one of the 'Edinburgh Seven', (Mary Anderson, Matilda Chaplin, Helen Evans, Sophia Jex-Blake, Edith Pechey and Isabel Thorne) her name is absent from the 1869 matriculation records, and the University of Edinburgh Class Prize lists for the 1869/70 academic year (the other women students are listed there). In late 1870 she won a scholarship sponsored by Katharine Russell, Viscountess Amberley, and her obituary states that she joined Sophia Jex-Blake and others at the University of Edinburgh to study medicine in 1871. In 1873 she moved to Paris to continue her studies, when it was no longer possible to continue at Edinburgh, and eventually qualified as a doctor in Paris in 1877. The subject of her medical thesis was "Congestive Phenomena following Epileptic and Hystero-epilectic Fits"

== Career ==
She met her husband, the physician William Allen Sturge in Paris in 1877, and they returned to London together, marrying on 27 September at St Saviour's Church in Paddington. Thereafter they set up a practice together in Wimpole Street, and Bovell renewed her relationship with Queen's College, lecturing on physiology and hygiene, and running ambulance classes for women. Her husband was a strong supporter of her professional career, and the cause of women's medical education in general. Five of his sisters had campaigned for women's higher education including Emily Sturge. In recognition of her contribution to the medical profession, in 1880 she was nominated by the French Government for the Officier d'Academie, an award rarely conferred on women.

In 1881, in consequence of her poor health, she and her husband gave up their practice in London, and moved to Nice. Bovell established her own practice in Nice and as the first woman doctor she gained a good number of female patients. She was made welcome in Nice and she campaigned to improve public health and to improve the sewers.

== Death and legacy ==
In 1884, her lung complaint became more serious, and in early April 1885 she died. She is buried in Sainte Marguerite Cemetery in Nice, France.

Her husband created a laboratory at Queen's College Harley Street which he named the Bovell-Sturge laboratory. The Edinburgh Seven are remembered in literature and history and they have a plaque in Edinburgh.

The Edinburgh Seven were awarded the posthumous honorary MBChB at the University of Edinburgh’s McEwan Hall on Saturday 6 July 2019. The degrees were collected on their behalf by a group of current students at Edinburgh Medical School. The graduation was the first of a series of events planned by the University of Edinburgh to commemorate the achievements and significance of the Edinburgh Seven.

== Awards and honours ==
- Ordre des Palmes académiques
