= Lucy Ellen Sewall =

19th-century American physician

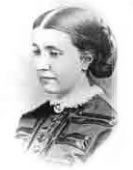
- Born: 26 April 1837; Roxbury, Massachusetts, US
- Died: 13 February 1890 (aged 52); Boston, Massachusetts, US

Lucy Ellen Sewall (26 April 1837 – 13 February 1890) was a 19th-century American physician. She was one of the first women to become a doctor in the United States.

== Biography ==
Lucy Ellen Sewall was born on 26 April 1837 in Roxbury, Massachusetts. Her parents were abolitionists Louisa Maria Winslow and Samuel Sewall. Louisa Maria Winslow died when Sewall was thirteen and her father remarried to her aunt, Harriet Winslow List, seven years later. Sewall attended the New England Female Medical College and graduated in 1862. She spent a year studying in both London and Paris. She went on to become one of the two physicians for the New England Hospital for Women and Children. Sewell became a director of the Hospital as well as working in private practice.

In 1881 Sewall tried to get Harvard to allow women to enter their medical school. With a group of eight women she offered them $50,000 but the attempt was unsuccessful. Sewall died of a heart condition on 13 February 1890. The New England Maternity building was dedicated to her and her father in 1892.
