= Isabel Thorne =

British women's rights activist

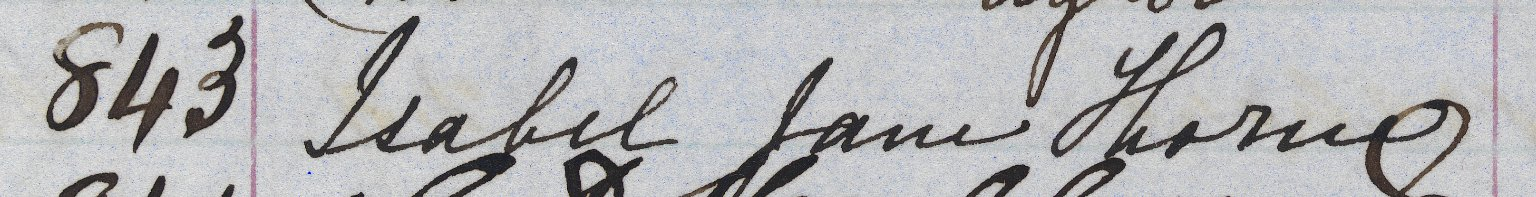
Matriculation Record, Isabel Thorne. University of Edinburgh Centre for Research Collections. Matriculation Roll, 1861-1874

Isabel Jane Thorne (née Pryer; 22 September 1834 – 9 October 1910) was an early campaigner for medical education for women. Mrs Thorne, as she was known, was a member of the feminist Edinburgh Seven, who campaigned and succeeded in securing the right by statute for women to be educated to qualify as doctors. An exemplary Victorian, Thorne's dedication to duty and service was a precursor for the more violent campaigns of the suffragettes to achieve full enfranchisement for women.

== Early life ==
She was born Isabel Jane Pryer on 22 September 1834 in London, the third daughter of Isabel (1812–1884) and Thomas Pryer (1810/11–1851), a solicitor. She was educated at Queen's College, London. On 12 August 1856 she married Joseph Thorne (1823–1885), a tea merchant in China and spent most of her early married life in Shanghai. The couple are believed to have had five children, including: Isobel (born 1860; became an art student), May (born Mary in 1861, who became a surgeon after supporting her mother in her campaigns); and Dr Atwood Thorne, surgeon to the London Throat Hospital. While living in Shanghai one of her children died which inspired her to travel to China and India to help women and children.

== Medical career ==
Thorne became convinced of the need for women to have female doctors for themselves and their children, especially women living in China and India. She travelled through China during the Taiping Rebellion. When the family returned to England in 1868 she started midwifery training at the Ladies' Medical College in Fitzroy Square, London, later describing the teaching there as inadequate.

Soon she responded to Sophia Jex-Blake's advertisement calling for women to join her in an attempt to qualify as doctors at the University of Edinburgh and so Thorne became one of the Edinburgh Seven (Mary Anderson, Emily Bovell, Matilda Chaplin, Helen Evans, Sophia Jex-Blake, Edith Pechey as well as Thorne). During this time, she won first prize in an anatomy examination. After their attempt to graduate in medicine was blocked, Thorne was one of the women who re-grouped at the London School of Medicine for Women. Her diplomatic temperament meant she was a more acceptable honorary secretary than Jex-Blake whose nomination had threatened to stir up controversy.

In 1876 an act of parliament made it possible for women to be admitted to examination in medicine. The Edinburgh Seven that set up the London School of Medicine for Women (LSMW) asked Thorne, who agreed to hold the position of Honorary Secretary from 12 June 1877 – 1908, and a seat on the executive, although she never actually qualified in medicine. Thorne gave up her own ambition to be a doctor in order to commit herself to helping the school run smoothly; to become more solidly established. But Dr Lucy Sewall had once written that of all the students at Edinburgh, Isabel Thorne was one most likely to make the best doctor. She was considerate, tactful, hard-working, industrious, and for 30 years the mainstay of the college administration.

Mrs Thorne kept records and wrote an account of these years which was published in 1905 as Sketch of the Foundation and Development of the London School of Medicine for Women. In 1908 her daughter, the surgeon May Thorne who had graduated from the LSMW in 1895, succeeded her as honorary secretary.

Thorne died at her home at 148 Harley Street, London, on 7 October 1910. She was cremated on 11 October; and her ashes were interred in Southover churchyard, Lewes.

== Recognition ==
The Edinburgh Seven were awarded the posthumous honorary MBChB at the University of Edinburgh’s McEwan Hall on Saturday 6 July 2019. The degrees were collected on their behalf by a group of current students at Edinburgh Medical School. The graduation was the first of a series of events planned by the University of Edinburgh to commemorate the achievements and significance of the Edinburgh Seven.

== Own publications ==
- Employment for Educated Women, Englishwoman's Review of Social and Industrial Questions [1867], vol.37, no.271 (1906), pp. 257–8
- Sketch of the Formation and Development of the London School of Medicine (1905)

== See also ==
- Edinburgh Seven
