= Sophia Jex-Blake =

British physician and suffragist (1840–1912)

Dr Sophia Jex-Blake
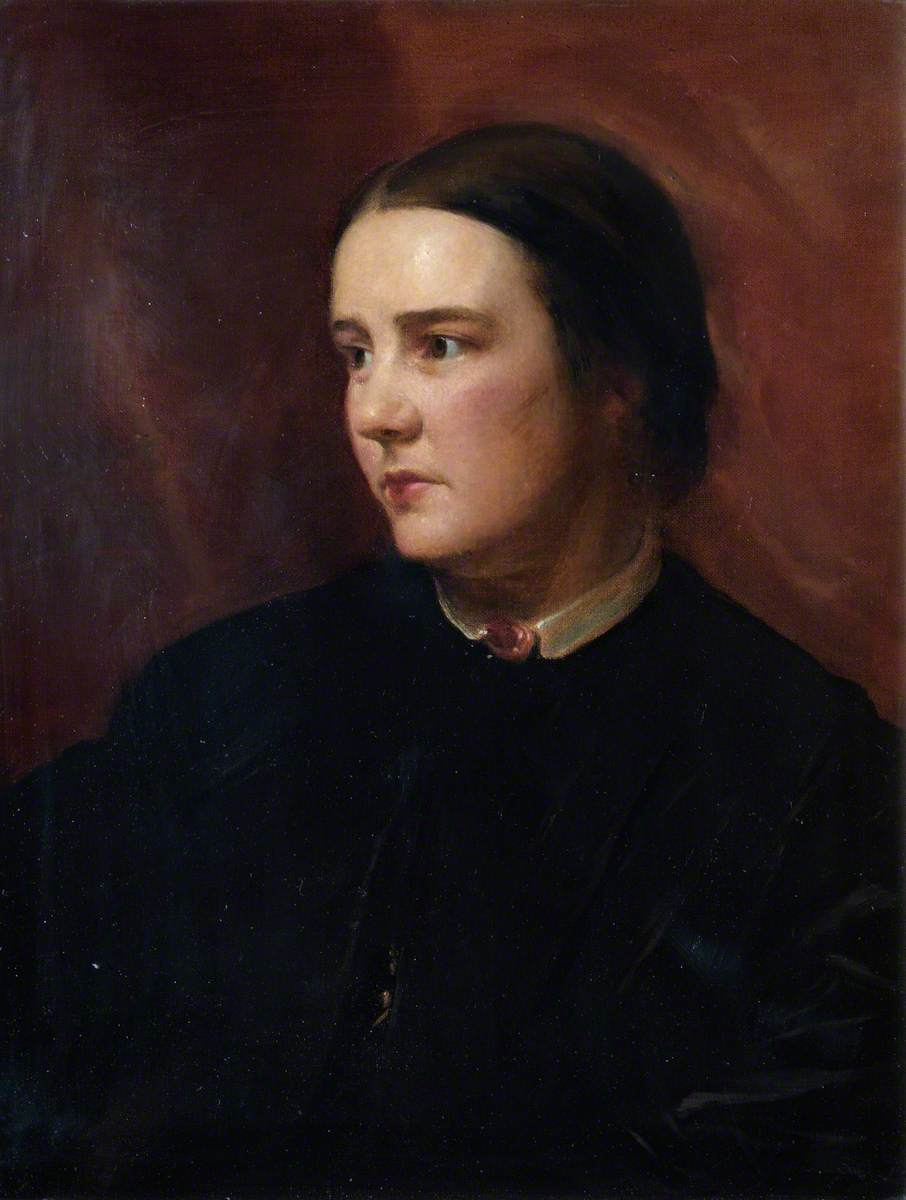
- Portrait by Samuel Laurence 1865
- Born: Sophia Louisa Jex-Blake; 21 January 1840; Hastings, Sussex, England
- Died: 7 January 1912 (aged 71); Mark Cross, Rotherfield, Sussex, England
- Known for: campaigning for women's medical education member of the Edinburgh Seven
- Medical career
- Profession: physician and teacher

Sophia Louisa Jex-Blake (21 January 1840 – 7 January 1912) was an English physician, teacher, and feminist. She led the campaign to secure women access to a university education, when she began studying medicine at the University of Edinburgh in 1869. She was the first practising female doctor in Scotland, and one of the first in the wider United Kingdom of Great Britain and Ireland; a leading campaigner for medical education for women, she was involved in founding two medical schools for women, in London and Edinburgh, at a time when no other medical schools were training women.

== Early life ==
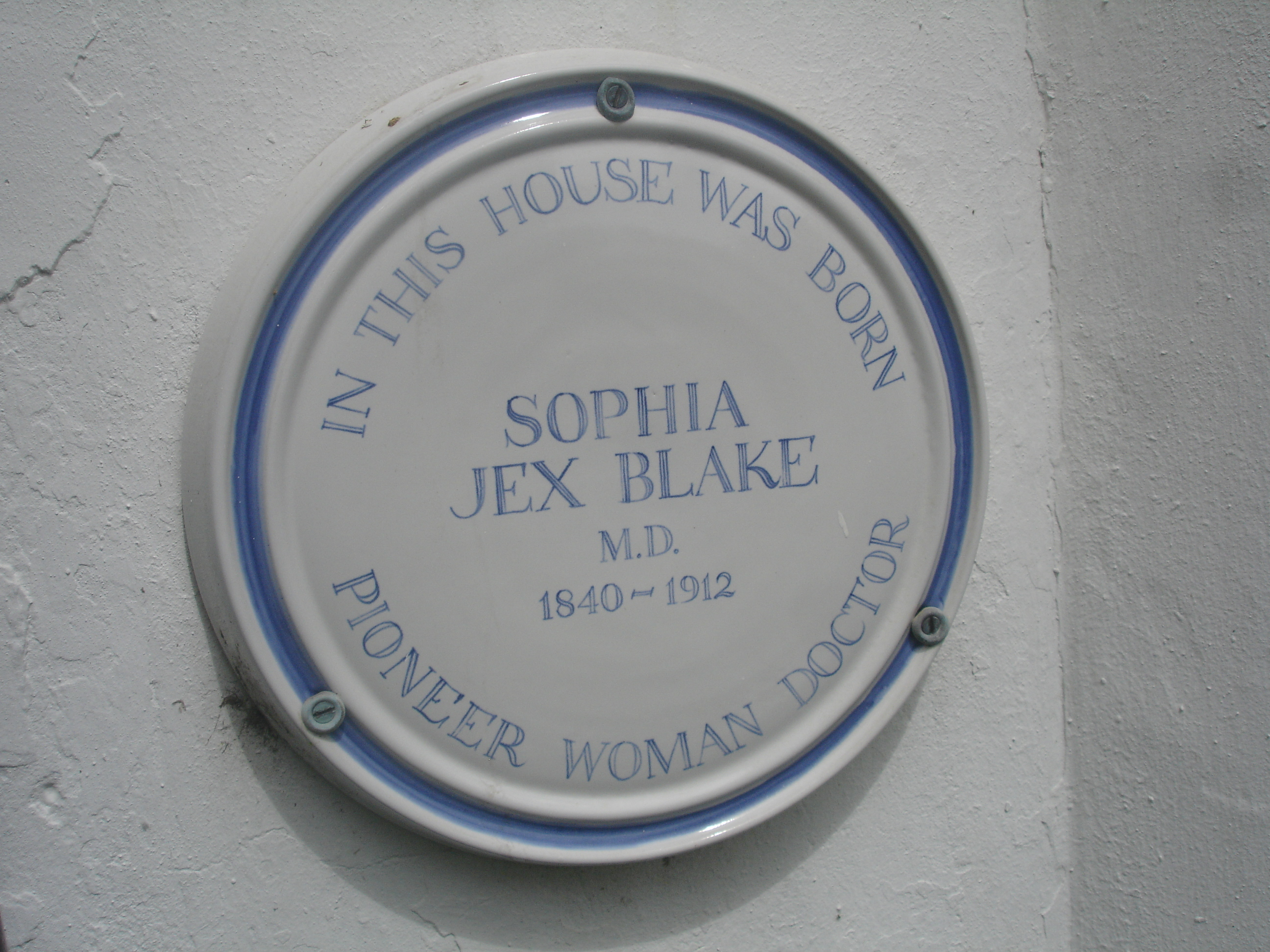
A plaque commemorating the birthplace of Sophia Jex-Blake

Sophia Jex-Blake was born at 3 Croft Place Hastings, England, on 21 January 1840, daughter of retired lawyer Thomas Jex-Blake, a proctor of Doctors' Commons, and Mary Jex-Blake (née Cubitt). Her brother was Thomas Jex-Blake, future Dean of Wells Cathedral, and father of Katharine Jex-Blake, classicist and Mistress of Girton College, Cambridge. Until the age of eight she was home-educated. She attended various private schools in southern England, and in 1858, enrolled at Queen's College, London, despite her parents' objections. In 1859, while still a student, she was offered a post as mathematics tutor at the college where she stayed until 1861, living for some of that time with Octavia Hill's family. She worked without pay; her family did not expect their daughter to earn a living, and her father refused her permission to accept a salary.

In 1865, once the Civil War was over, Sophia Jex-Blake travelled to the United States to learn more about women's education. She visited various schools, was strongly influenced by developments in co-education in the US, and later published A Visit to Some American Schools and Colleges. At the New England Hospital for Women and Children in Boston, she met one of the country's pioneer female physicians, Dr Lucy Ellen Sewall, who became an important and lifelong friend, and she worked there for a time as an assistant. This was a turning point for Jex-Blake, as she realised, during this visit, that to become a doctor was her life's vocation.

In 1867, along with Susan Dimock, a trainee from the New England hospital, she wrote directly to the president and fellows of Harvard University, requesting admission to the university's medical school. She and Dimock received their reply a month later, in a letter which stated: "There is no provision for the education of women in any department of this university". The following year, she hoped to attend a new medical college being established by Elizabeth Blackwell in New York, but her father died, so she returned to England to be with her mother.

== "A fair field and no favour" ==
In 1869, Jex-Blake's essay "Medicine as a profession for women" appeared in a book edited by Josephine Butler: Women's Work and Women's Culture. In this, she argued that natural instinct leads women to concern themselves with the care of the sick. With education of girls being restricted to domestic crafts, though, women generally could not qualify to compete with men as medical practitioners. She argued that no objective proof existed of women's intellectual inferiority to men. She said that the matter could easily be tested by granting women "a fair field and no favour" - teaching them as men were taught and subjecting them to the same examinations.

== Campaign ==
Sophia Jex-Blake was determined to seek medical training in the UK, and due to Scotland's more enlightened attitudes towards education, felt that if any university would allow women to study, it would be a Scottish one. She applied to study medicine at the University of Edinburgh in March 1869, and although the medical faculty and the senatus academus voted in favour of allowing her to study medicine, the university court rejected her application on the grounds that the university could not make the necessary arrangements "in the interest of one lady".

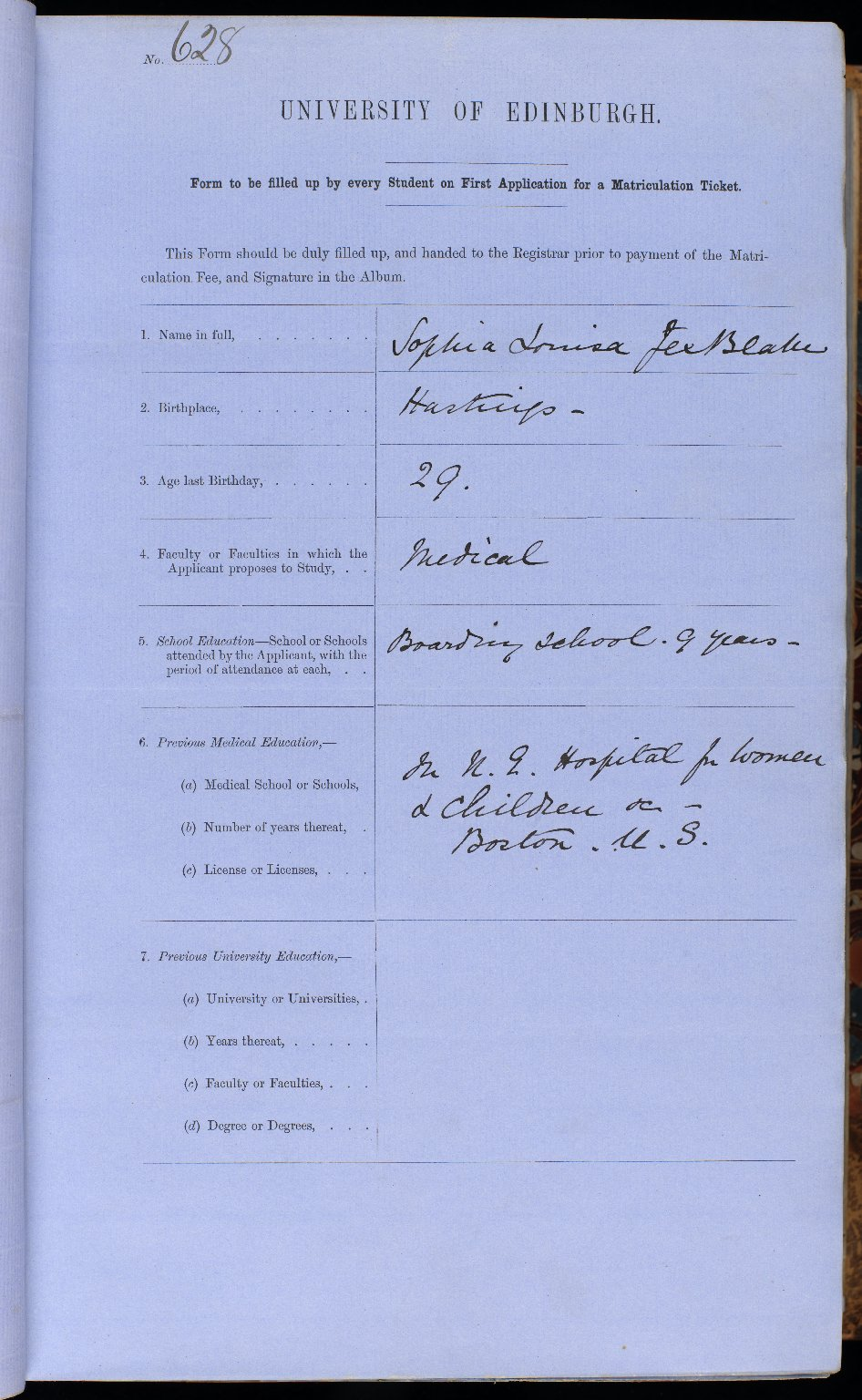
Jex-Blake's application for matriculation, submitted to the University of Edinburgh, is held in their archives.

She then advertised in The Scotsman and other national newspapers for more women to join her. A second application was submitted in 1869 on behalf of the group of five women initially (Matilda Chaplin, Helen Evans, Sophia Jex-Blake, Edith Pechey, and Isabel Thorne). It requested the right to attend all the classes and examinations required for a degree in medicine. This second application was approved by the university court and the University of Edinburgh became the first British university to admit women.

Sophia Jex-Blake wrote in one of her letters to her great friend Lucy Sewall:

"It is a grand thing to enter the very first British University ever opened to women, isn't it?"

Over the next three years, 35 more women took medical classes in Edinburgh.

== Surgeons' Hall riot ==
As the women began to demonstrate that they could compete on equal terms with the male students, hostility towards them grew. They received obscene letters, were followed home, had fireworks attached to their front door, and had mud thrown at them. This culminated in the Surgeons' Hall riot on 18 November 1870, when the women arrived to sit an anatomy examination at Surgeons' Hall, and an angry mob of over 200 gathered outside throwing mud, rubbish, and insults at the women.

The events made national headlines and won the women many new supporters, but influential members of the medical faculty eventually persuaded the university to refuse graduation to the women by appealing decisions to higher courts. The courts eventually ruled that the women who had been allowed to matriculate should never have been allowed to enter the course. The campaign in Edinburgh failed in 1873. Sophia Jex-Blake called seven women medical students the Septem contra Edinam, or the Seven against Edinburgh, including Mary Adamson Anderson and Emily Bovell, who had joined classes in 1870. Many of the disappointed women students went to European universities that were already allowing women to graduate, and took MD degrees, but these were not accepted by the General Medical Council to allow them to practice medicine in the UK.

=== "The time for a reform has come" ===
Women were eventually admitted onto degree programmes at other British Universities in 1877. James Stansfeld, who had been closely associated with the London campaign (following the failure of the Edinburgh campaign) wrote, in his brief history of the events:

Dr Sophia Jex-Blake has made the greatest of all contributions to the end attained. I do not say that she has been the ultimate cause of success. The ultimate cause has been simply this, that the time was at hand. It is one of the lessons of the history of progress that when the time for reform has come you cannot resist it, though if you make the attempt, what you may do is to widen its character or precipitate its advent. Opponents, when the time has come, are not merely dragged at the chariot wheels of progress - they help to turn them. The strongest forces, whichever way it seems to work, does most to aid. The forces of greatest concentration here have been, in my view, on the one hand the Edinburgh University led by Sir Robert Christison, on the other the women claimants led by Dr Sophia Jex-Blake.

== Qualification as a physician ==
In 1874, Sophia Jex-Blake helped establish the London School of Medicine for Women, which became the Royal Free Hospital School of Medicine for Women, but also continued campaigning and studying. The Medical Act 1876 (39 & 40 Vict. c. 41) soon followed, which was an act to repeal the previous statute, while also permitting medical authorities to license all qualified applicants whatever their gender. The first organisation to take advantage of this new legislation was the Royal College of Physicians of Ireland, but before Jex-Blake applied to them, she passed the medical exams at the University of Berne, where she was awarded a medical doctorate in January 1877. Four months later, she had further success in Dublin and qualified as licentiate of the King and Queen's College of Physicians of Ireland (LKQCPI), meaning she could at last be registered with the General Medical Council, the third registered woman doctor in the UK.

== Medical career ==
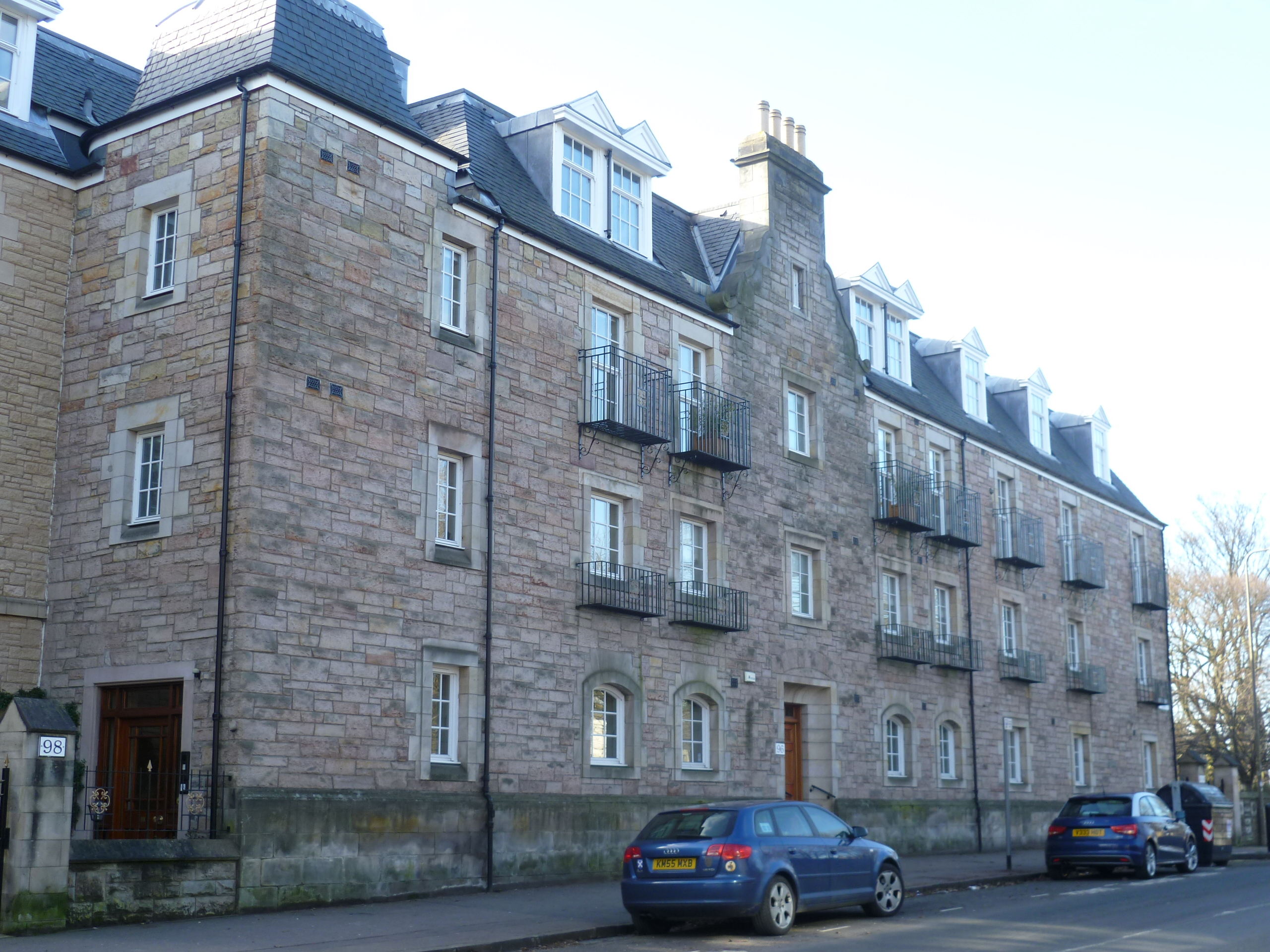
Bruntsfield Hospital, converted to private flats, 2010

Jex-Blake returned to Edinburgh, where she leased a house at 4 Manor Place, and in June 1878 put up her brass plate; Edinburgh had its first woman doctor. Three months later, she opened an outpatient clinic at 73 Grove Street, Fountainbridge, where poor women could receive medical attention for a few pence. After her mother's death in 1881, Sophia Jex-Blake had a period of depressed reclusiveness. The dispensary expanded by 1885 was moved to larger premises at 6 Grove Street, where a five-bed ward was added. The little outpatient clinic thus became the Edinburgh Hospital and Dispensary for Women. This was Scotland's first hospital for women staffed entirely by women.

In 1886, she established the Edinburgh School of Medicine for Women. Effectively a small extramural class, it was largely enabled by a small group of profemale male physicians and surgeons recognised by the University of Edinburgh giving extramural classes open to men and women (which the university could not prevent). The first students included Margaret Ida Balfour, Elsie Inglis, Grace Ross Cadell, and her sister Georgina, but Jex-Blake's skill as a teacher did not match her role as a doctor. An acrimonious split emerged, with her students culminating in an infamous court case in 1889, where Jex-Blake was successfully sued for damages. Thereafter, the Cadell sisters pursued their studies with the more genial, though far younger, Elsie Inglis, whose father and his network had set up a rival school, the Edinburgh College of Medicine for Women. Jex-Blake's school continued until 1898, when she retired and moved to Sussex. In 1892, University of Edinburgh allowed female medical students to take its degree examinations. The Edinburgh College of Medicine for Women continued until 1908, after which the School of Medicine of the Royal Colleges of Edinburgh at Surgeons' Hall taught women students, increasingly in mixed-sex classes.

Jex-Blake lived and conducted her practice for 16 years in the house known as Bruntsfield Lodge on Whitehouse Loan. When she retired in 1898, the Edinburgh Hospital and Dispensary for Women and Children moved to this site, and became known as Bruntsfield Hospital, where it continued to function until 1989.

== Personal life ==
Jex-Blake is assumed to have been in a romantic relationship with Dr Margaret Todd. On Jex-Blake's retirement in 1899, they moved to Windydene, Mark Cross, Rotherfield, where Dr Todd wrote The Way of Escape in 1902 and Growth in 1906. Her home became a meeting place for former students and colleagues, and she welcomed writers and acquaintances from the world over.

== Death and commemoration ==
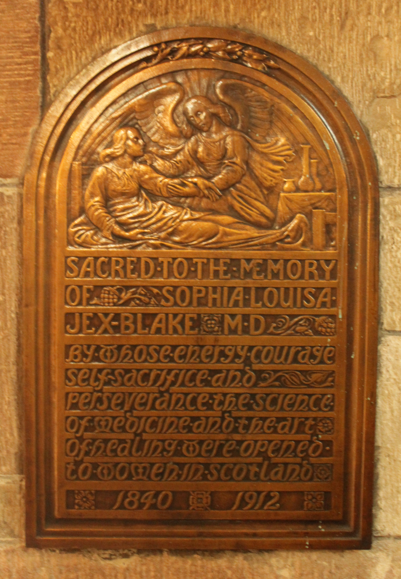
Memorial to Sophia Jex-Blake in St Giles Cathedral

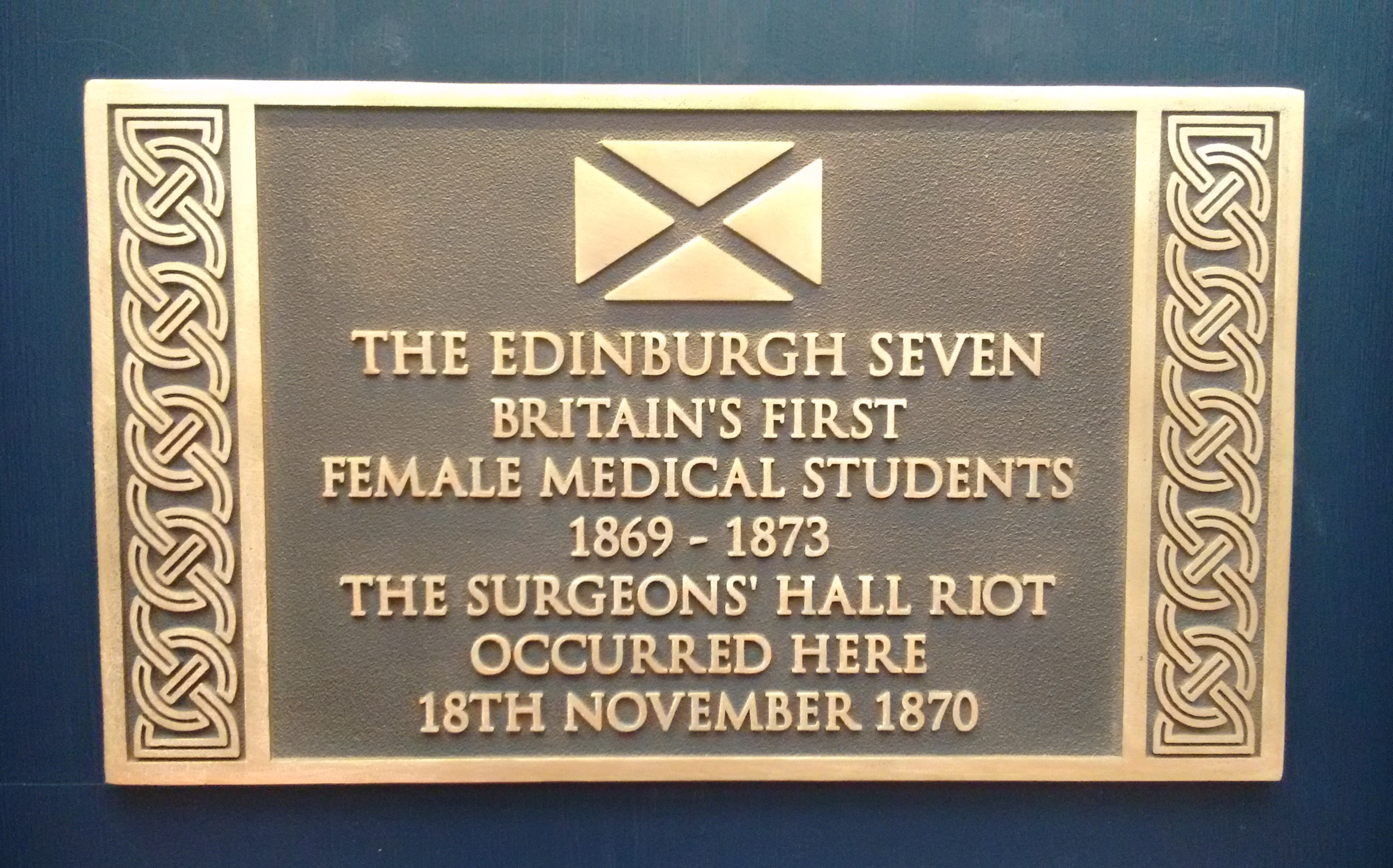
Historic Scotland commemorative plaque to the Edinburgh Seven and the Surgeons' Hall riot

Jex-Blake died at Windydene on 7 January 1912, at age 71, and is buried at St Denys Rotherfield. Todd subsequently wrote The Life of Dr Sophia Jex-Blake.

The University of Edinburgh commemorated Jex-Blake with a plaque (by Pilkington Jackson) near the entrance to its medical school, honouring her as "Physician, pioneer of medical education for women in Britain, alumna of the University".

In 2015, an Historic Scotland plaque was unveiled to commemorate the Surgeons' Hall Riot of 18 November 1870.

The Edinburgh Seven were awarded the posthumous honorary MBChB degrees at the University of Edinburgh's McEwan Hall on 6 July 2019. The degrees were collected on their behalf by a group of current students at Edinburgh Medical School. Medical student Simran Piya collected an honorary degree on behalf of Sophia Jex-Blake. The graduation was the first of a series of events planned by the University of Edinburgh to commemorate the achievements and significance of the Edinburgh Seven.

In 2020, Bellfield Brewery launched a new India pale ale named after Sophia Jex-Blake.

In 2021, a production of a dramatic piece about the experiences of Jex-Blake and the Edinburgh Seven, Sophia, by Scottish playwright Frances Poet, was announced.

University College London established the Sophia Jex-Blake Chair of Physiology. The current incumbent is Professor Stephanie Schorge.

== Relatives ==
- Thomas William Jex-Blake (1832–1915), brother, headmaster of Rugby School from 1874 to 1887.
- Katharine Jex-Blake, niece, mistress of Girton College from 1916 to 1922.
- Henrietta Jex-Blake, niece, principal of Lady Margaret Hall from 1909 to 1921.
- Arthur John Jex-Blake, nephew, British physician and fellow of the Royal College of Physicians.
- Bertha Jex-Blake, niece, British physician who studied at the Edinburgh College of Medicine for Women and drowned near Whitby in 1915.

== Selected writings ==
- Jex-Blake, Sophia (1867). A Visit to Some American Schools and Colleges. London: Macmillan and Company. "A visit to some American schools and colleges."
- Jex-Blake, Sophia (1872). Medical Women: A Thesis and a History.
- Jex-Blake, Sophia (1876). The Practice of Medicine by Women. — written with Edith Pechey and Isabel Thorne
- Jex-Blake, Sophia (1877). Puerperal Fever: an Inquiry into its Nature and Treatment: A Graduation Thesis.
- Jex-Blake, Sophia (1884). The Care of Infants: A Manual for Mothers and Nurses. London: Macmillan and Company. "The care of infants: a manual for mothers and nurses."

== See also ==
- Leith Hospital
- London School of Medicine for Women
- Queen's College, London
- Margaret Todd (doctor)
- Surgeons' Hall riot
