= Edinburgh Seven =

First British female medical students, 1869

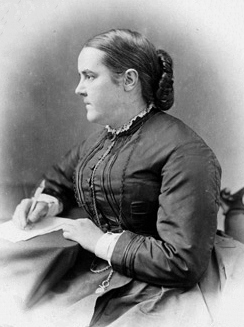
Sophia Jex-Blake, leader of the Edinburgh Seven

The Edinburgh Seven were the first group of matriculated undergraduate female students at any British university. They began studying medicine at the University of Edinburgh in 1869 and, although the Court of Session ruled that they should never have been admitted, and they did not graduate or qualify as doctors, the campaign they fought gained national attention and won them many supporters, including Charles Darwin. Their campaign put the demands of women for a university education on the national political agenda, and eventually resulted in the Medical Act 1876 that enabled women to be licensed to practise medicine.

The group was also called the Septem contra Edinam ("Seven against Edinburgh", in reference to the Seven against Thebes of Greek mythology). Although over the four-year campaign some of the original seven left and others joined, the following women became known as the Edinburgh Seven:

- Sophia Jex-Blake
- Isabel Thorne
- Edith Pechey
- Matilda Chaplin
- Helen Evans
- Mary Anderson
- Emily Bovell

They were the seven women listed in the petition to the Royal Infirmary on 15 November 1870 requesting admission to clinical teaching. They were all registered in the GMC Medical Students Register between 1869 and 1870 as bona fide medical students and required clinical instruction at the Infirmary in order to fulfil the requirements of a medical degree.

== The start of the Edinburgh campaign ==
Sophia Jex-Blake applied to study medicine in March 1869 and although the Medical Faculty and the Senatus Academicus voted in favour of allowing her to study medicine, the University Court rejected her application on the grounds that the university could not make the necessary arrangements 'in the interest of one lady'

Jex-Blake then advertised in The Scotsman and other national newspapers for more women to join her. The first two women to write to her were Isabel Thorne and Edith Pechey. Edith Pechey's letter read:

Do you think anything more is requisite to ensure success than moderate abilities and a good share of perseverance? I believe I may lay claim to these, together with a real love of the subjects of study, but as regards any thorough knowledge of these subjects at present, I fear I am deficient in most. I am afraid I should not without a good deal of previous study be able to pass the preliminary exam.

This modest letter did not do justice to her intellectual ability; see § The Hope Scholarship below.

A second application was submitted in the summer of 1869 on behalf of a group of five women. It requested matriculation and all that that implied: the right to attend all the classes and examinations required for a degree in medicine.

This application was approved by the University Court, by which time the group had grown to seven. The women set up home in 15 Buccleuch Place, now home to the University of Edinburgh's Student Experience Office, and began preparing for the matriculation exam.

== The matriculation examination of 1869 ==
The examination was in two parts. English, Latin and mathematics were compulsory subjects; in addition, each candidate had to choose two subjects from a group that included Greek, French, German, higher mathematics, natural philosophy, logic, and moral philosophy. Sophia Jex-Blake acted as mathematics tutor to the other women. Of the 152 candidates who sat the exam on 19 October 1869 five were women. Four of the women came in the top seven places.

== The first women undergraduates in Britain ==
On 2 November 1869 the women signed the matriculation roll. In so doing, the University of Edinburgh became the first British university to open its doors to women. Jex-Blake wrote in one of her letters to her friend Lucy Sewall:

It is a grand thing to enter the very first British University ever opened to women, isn't it?

One of the historic documents in the campaign is the Edinburgh University Calendar for 1870. It contained a new section, which appeared under the heading Regulations for the Education of Women in Medicine in the University. It stated that the women would receive all their tuition in classes separate from those for men and would pay higher fees due to their classes being smaller. In all other respects the women were to be treated exactly as the men were, 'subject to all the regulations now or at any future time in force in the University as to the matriculation of students, their attendance on classes, examinations or otherwise.'

== The Hope Scholarship ==
In March 1870, the women sat the first examinations in physiology and chemistry. Not only did they all pass, but four of them had obtained honours in both subjects. Edith Pechey, who had written the humble letter to Sophia Jex-Blake (see above), had won first place amongst the candidates sitting the exam for the first time and so had first claim on a Hope Scholarship.

This scholarship had been instituted 40 years previously by the Professor of Chemistry, Thomas Charles Hope, and was awarded to the first four of those students who were sitting it for the first time. Dr Crum-Brown, the current Professor of Chemistry, had at first been pleased to help the women students, but had observed growing resentment towards them from colleagues in the Medical Faculty, in particular the influential Sir Robert Christison. He was also concerned that awarding the scholarship to a woman would be seen as a provocation to the male students. He therefore decided to award the scholarships to male students who got lower marks than the women.

== Hostility towards the women grows ==
Professor Robert Christison was one of the women's vehement opponents. A debate was held in April 1870 by the University Court to decide on whether the women should be allowed in mixed classes (and thereby be fully equal to the male students, reducing the significantly higher fees they were paying and making them eligible to win prizes too). During this debate, Prof. Robert Christison and Prof. Laycock expressed views that gained the attention of the national press, which came down in support of the women. The Times commented,

It is the strongest argument against the admission of young ladies to the Edinburgh medical classes that they would attend the lectures of Professors who are capable of talking in this strain.

Laycock had suggested that women seeking medical careers might be "basely inclined" or might be "Magdalenes" (reformed prostitutes). The Times had wondered why he might not equally be concerned about male students. Robert Christison had questioned the validity of the belief that women patients would want women doctors, his own enquiries leading him to believe the opposite to be true. He concluded his argument by saying "Become Midwives, not doctors!"

It was Christison's influence that saw many faculty staff who had initially been supportive of the women turn away from teaching them throughout the rest of 1870. A growing proportion of the male students began to be offensive and insolent, shutting doors in the women's faces, crowding into seats that they usually sat in, bursting into "horse laughs and howls" whenever the women approached.

Jex-Blake later wrote that it was "as if a conspiracy had been formed to make our position as uncomfortable as might be". She catalogued the abuse: her doorbell was "wrenched off" and her nameplate damaged five times; a Catherine wheel was attached to her door; smoke was blown in their faces; filthy letters were sent; they were waylaid in quiet streets; obscenities were shouted at them in public.

Edith Pechey, in a letter to The Scotsman, also spoke of being followed in the streets and having "the foulest epithets", such as "whore", shouted at her.

Friends and supporters believed that some of the professors were deliberately inciting the students to behave in this way. The women began to take precautions, such as walking only as a group, but none of them were prepared for the events that took place on Friday 18 November 1870.

== The Surgeons' Hall riot ==
At four o'clock in the afternoon of Friday 18 November 1870 the women were due to sit an anatomy exam at Surgeons' Hall. As they approached they found that Nicholson Street was blocked by a crowd of several hundred. When the women were seen approaching, a large number of the crowd began pelting them with rubbish and mud as well as shouting abuse and insults at them.

They made their way to the main entrance of Surgeons' Hall only to have the gates slammed in their faces. They endured the hostility of the crowd until a sympathetic student came to their rescue and opened the front gates for them. At the end of the exam, the women declined the offer of leaving via a side entrance onto the street. The Surgeons' Hall Riot, as it has now become known, was a landmark in the history of the medical women's campaign and attracted widespread publicity. It won the women many new friends and sympathisers.

It also galvanised support from some male students, who were shocked by the way the women were treated that day. The supportive students began to act as bodyguards to the women, escorting them back to 15 Buccleuch Place at the end of the examination that day. For many weeks after, they would come and pick the women up from their home and escort them to and from classes.

The controversy continued in the press. The article Female Education in Medicine in "The Edinburgh University Magazine" of February 1871 discussed the arguments for and against admitting women to study medicine. It also discussed the monetary considerations for professors' remuneration and the lack of beds in the Edinburgh Infirmary to be shared with the male students. The article recommends that "these female students offer their services as students, dressers, and clerks to one of our great parochial hospitals, Craiglockhart or Craigleith." It concludes that: "Let us here, however, simply in self-defence state our firm belief that it is a sign not of advancing but of decaying civilisation when women force themselves into competition with the other sex."

== The defamation case and the national campaign ==
Later, the Sheriff fined three "disorderly" students £1 each for "breach of the peace". Jex-Blake said the young men had been encouraged by a teaching assistant, but lost when he sued her for defamation.

Other women had joined their classes, some doctors had taught them gladly, and supporters had formed a General Committee for Securing a Complete Medical Education for Women with a membership of over 300, including Charles Darwin. Yet in the end they lost the battle to graduate. In 1873 the Court of Session supported the University's right to refuse the women degrees. They also ruled, by a majority, that the women should not have been admitted in the first place. This defeat and their other struggles motivated most of them to continue, not only for personal reasons, but as part of a wider cause.

== After 1873 ==
Sophia Jex-Blake soon moved to London to campaign there. She was active in establishing the London School of Medicine for Women, which opened in autumn 1874 with twelve of its fourteen students having previously studied in Edinburgh. Six of the original "Seven" attended the School. Isabel Thorne was an asset to its smooth running since she was more diplomatic than Jex-Blake. She became the honorary secretary of the School, but gave up her own plan to practise as a doctor.

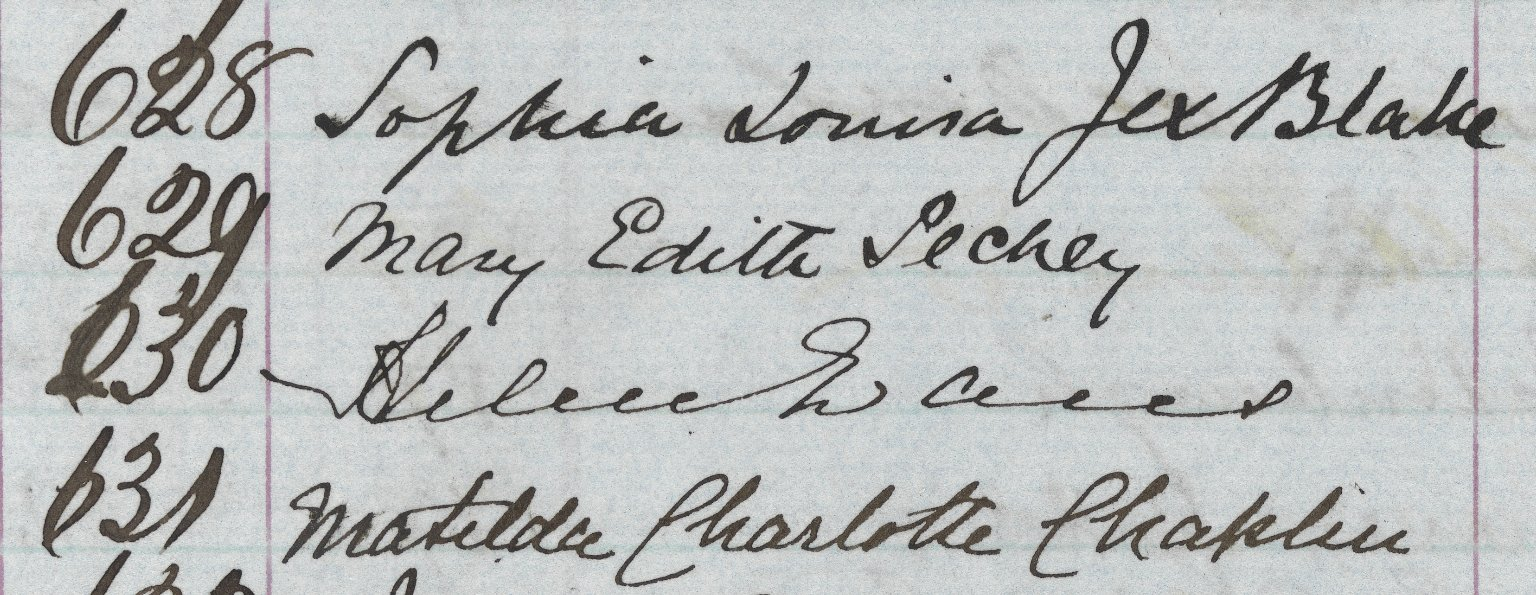
Matriculation Signatures: Sophia Jex-Blake, Mary Pechey, Helen Evans, Matilda Chaplin

Five of the original seven – Bovell, Chaplin, Jex-Blake, Marshall and Pechey – were granted MDs abroad in the later 1870s, either in Bern or Paris. In 1876 new legislation enabled, but did not compel, examining bodies to treat candidates of both sexes equally. The Irish College of Physicians (then called the Kings and Queens College of Physicians) was the first to start granting medical practice licences to women: an opportunity for four of the newly qualified women.

In 1878 Jex-Blake returned to Edinburgh and set up at Manor Place in the New Town as the city's first woman doctor. She also established a clinic for poor patients which was the forerunner of Bruntsfield Hospital. Once Scotland started licensing women doctors, Jex-Blake helped found the Edinburgh School of Medicine for Women, with clinical practice taking place at Leith Hospital. Edith Pechey practised in Leeds before becoming senior medical officer at the new Cama women and children's hospital in Bombay (now Mumbai). Bovell and Marshall worked at the New Hospital for Women in London. Chaplin founded a midwifery school in Tokyo, but later returned to private practice in London.

In 1889, a rival college for the education of women in medicine in Edinburgh was established by Elsie Inglis, the Edinburgh College of Medicine for Women, following a dispute between Jex-Blake and the Cadell sisters, the teaching there was aimed to prepare women for direct entry to medicine via the Triple Qualification.

Edinburgh University and the other Scottish universities eventually admitted women undergraduates in 1892 after the Universities (Scotland) Act 1889 established a legal framework for this. All classes were co-educational except for medical classes.

== Tributes ==
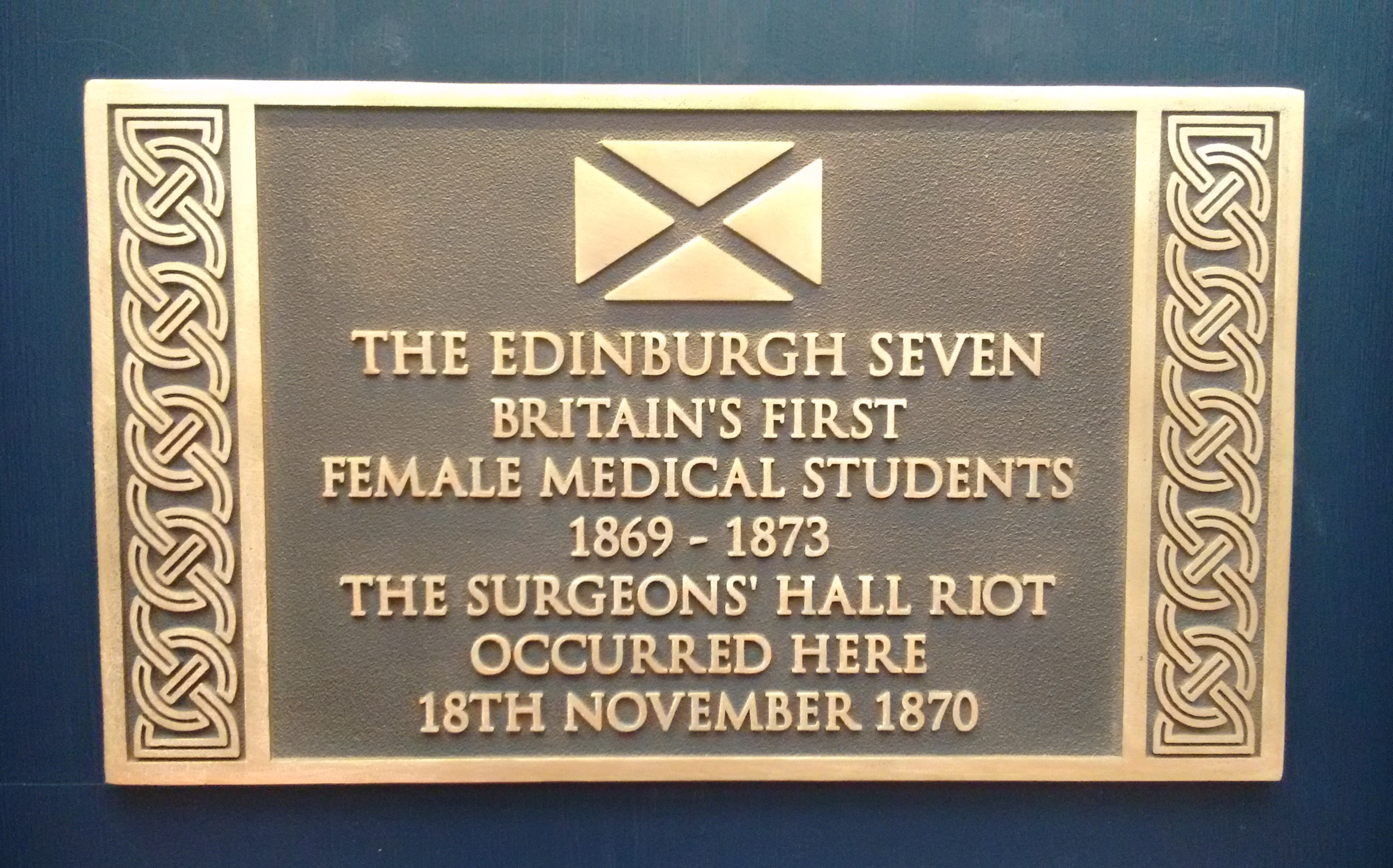
Historic Scotland commemorative plaque to the Edinburgh Seven and the Surgeons' Hall riot

In 2015 the Edinburgh Seven were commemorated with a plaque at Edinburgh University, as part of the Historic Scotland Commemorative Plaques Scheme.

In 2019, Edinburgh Medical School awarded the Edinburgh Seven the posthumous honorary degree of MBChB. Seven female students received the certificates on behalf of the Edinburgh Seven. The graduation ceremony was part of a series of events to honour their achievements.

From 21 October 2019 to 7 November 2019 the exhibition Medical Inspirations was held at the Chaplaincy Centre, Edinburgh University, to celebrate the 150th anniversary of the first group of female medical students to matriculate at a British University. Included was a new painting of the Edinburgh Seven and the Surgeons' Hall Riot of 18 November 1870.

=== In fiction and recent biography ===
In Charles Reade's novel, A Woman-Hater (1877), Rhoda Gould tells the story of the Edinburgh Seven in some detail, as if she had been one of them: "We were seven ladies, who wished to be doctresses, especially devoted to our own sex ...". While the 'woman-hating' character of Vizard has to be persuaded of Rhoda's potential to do good, Reade's own attitude is sympathetic: " ... it matters greatly to mankind whether the whole race of women are to be allowed to study medicine and practice it".

In 2022 the Edinburgh Lyceum Theatre announced the premiere of the play 'Seven Against Edinburgh' - a dramatization of the lives of the Edinburgh Seven. 'Victorian Edinburgh. Present day Edinburgh. What do the two have in common? Seven women who will stop at nothing to make change. But will Edinburgh stop them?'

in 2023, a new biographical book by Janey Jones was published covering the story of the women's struggle for education and comparing it with the situation for women in Afghanistan and the author also said "I'm still seeing patriarchal sentiment out there in the top echelons of society and that was the Edinburgh Seven's problems.... I don't want women today to sleepwalk through that existing prejudice."

== See also ==
- Alice Robeson
- Agnes Yewande Savage
- Agnes McLaren
- Annie Clark
- Constance Ellis
- Edinburgh Association for the University Education of Women
- Elsie Inglis
- Emily Blackwell
- Elizabeth Blackwell
- Flora Murray
- Grace Cadell
- Isabella Pringle
- Louisa Garrett Anderson
- Louisa Stevenson
- Maria Zakrzewska
- Marion Gilchrist

== Sources ==
- Elston, M. A. 'Edinburgh Seven (act. 1869–1873)' in Oxford Dictionary of National Biography (2015)
- Roberts, S. Sophia Jex-Blake: a woman pioneer in nineteenth century medical reform (1993)
- Ross, Margaret The Royal Medical Society and Medical Women Proc R Coll Physicians Edinb. Vol. 26(4):629-44. (1996)
- The Scotsman archives
- The Female Students at Surgeons' Hall in The Scotsman (23 November 1870)
- Scottish Law Reporter (1873)
- Charles Reade, A Woman-Hater (1877), Chapter XIII
