= List of recipients of the Triple Qualification =

This is a list of notable recipients of the Triple Qualification, a medical qualification jointly awarded by the Royal College of Surgeons of Edinburgh, the Royal College of Physicians of Edinburgh and the Faculty (later the Royal College) of Physicians and Surgeons of Glasgow) between 1884 and 1993. Successful candidates were eligible to register with the General Medical Council (GMC) and practise medicine in the United Kingdom.

The qualification provided an alternative route into the medical profession, particularly for international medical graduates and women who faced restrictions on admission to university medical schools in the late nineteenth century.

Name	Year qualified	Known for
Elizabeth Adelaide Baker	1892	South African physician who was the first woman to apply for Fellowship at the Royal College of Physicians and Surgeons of Glasgow and to practise in the City of Oxford.
John Theodore Anderson	1906	Australian physician, psychiatrist and cricketer.
Hastings Banda	1941	Malawian physician and politician who served as Prime Minister of Nyasaland and was the first President of Malawi.
Dagmar Berne	1893	Australian physician and one of the first women to study medicine in Australia.
Edith Mary Brown	1891	British physician, medical missionary and founder of the Christian Medical College Ludhiana.
Grace Cadell	1891	Scottish physician and suffragist.
G. Cooke Adams	1892	Australian physician and cancer reasearcher.
Isabella Hardie Curr	1895	Scottish physician, medical missionary in British Ceylon and OBE recipient.
Lydia Datt	1899	Indian physician.
Umedram Lalbhai Desai	1894	Indian physician who served as a state surgeon in India.
Florence Dissent	1894	Anglo-Indian physician and surgeon who worked in women's healthcare in British India.
Thomas Donovan	1896	Irish rugby union player, physician and surgeon.
Henry Edward Manning Douglas	1898	British Army medical officer and recipient of the Victoria Cross.
Cuthbert Lindsay Dunn	1899	Scottish physician who was a Lieutenant-Colonel in the Indian Medical Service, Director of Public Health in the United Provinces of India and author on public health and medical services.
John Simeon Colebrook Elkington	1896	Australian physician and public health pioneer.
Elizabeth Latto Ewan	1895	Scottish physician and first female general practitioner in Aberdeen.
Elizabeth Blackburn Ferguson	1891	Scottish physician and medical missionary who provided women's healthcare in Taiwan.
Corelli Collard Field	1896	Canadian physician and paediatrician who headed the Children's Department at Winnipeg General Hospital.
Kadambini Ganguly	1892	Indian physician, women's rights advocate the first Indian women to practise Western medicine in British India.
Beatrice Garvie	1891	Scottish physician, photographer and medical missionary in India.
Mary Gordon	1890	British physician and writer who became the first woman to serve as a prison inspector in Britain.
Lilian Mary Grandin	1904	British physician and medical missionary in China, who became the first woman from Jersey to qualify as a physician.
Herbert Maunsell Hewlett	1896	Australian physician and pioneering radiologist who served as Vice-President of the Royal Australian and New Zealand College of Radiologists.
Elsie Inglis	1892	Scottish physician, surgeon, suffragist and founder of the Scottish Women's Hospitals for Foreign Service.
Annie Wardlaw Jagannadham	1890	Indian physician who became the first Indian woman to be registered on the British Medical Register.
William Keiller	1888	Scottish physician, surgeon and anatomist.
Gerald R. Leighton	1895	British physician, zoologist and herpetologist.
Ida Macalpine	1934	German and British physician, psychiatrist and medical historian.
Jessie MacLaren MacGregor	1892	Scottish physician and campaigner for women's medical education.
Mary Harriet Macnicol	1895	Scottish physician and medical missionary who practised in India, and later at women’s hospitals in Edinburgh.
Caroline Nompozolo	1942	First Black South African woman to qualify as a physician.
Bill O'Hara	1903	Australian rules footballer and physician.
Kate Kirk Paton	1893	Scottish physician who helped provide medical care and education in a remote region of Manchuria.
Rukhmabai Raut	1894	Indian physician and women's rights activist whose landmark child marriage legal case contributed to reforms in women's rights in British India.
Beatrice Russell	1894	Scottish medical graduate who served as chair of the personnel committee of the Scottish Women's Hospitals and later helped establish the Elsie Inglis Memorial Hospital.
Bert Salkeld	1900	Australian rules footballer and surgeon.
Thomas Edmondston Saxby	1897	Scottish physician, ornithologist and OBE recipient who served as the only doctor on Unst, Shetland, from 1898 to 1950.
Pelham Wykesmith	1895	British physician and co-founder of the Ruo Tea Estate in Nyasaland.

== See also ==
- Triple Qualification
- Medical education in the United Kingdom
- Extramural medical education in Edinburgh
- Edinburgh School of Medicine for Women
- Edinburgh College of Medicine for Women
