= Grace Cadell =

Early woman Scottish doctor

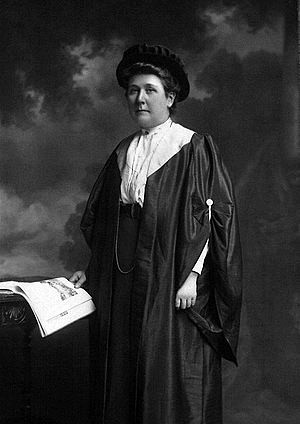
- Born: Grace Ross Cadell; 25 October 1855; Carriden, West Lothian, Scotland
- Died: 19 February 1918 (aged 62); Yetts o'Muckhart, Kinross, Scotland
- Occupation: Medical practitioner
- Known for: Work as suffragette

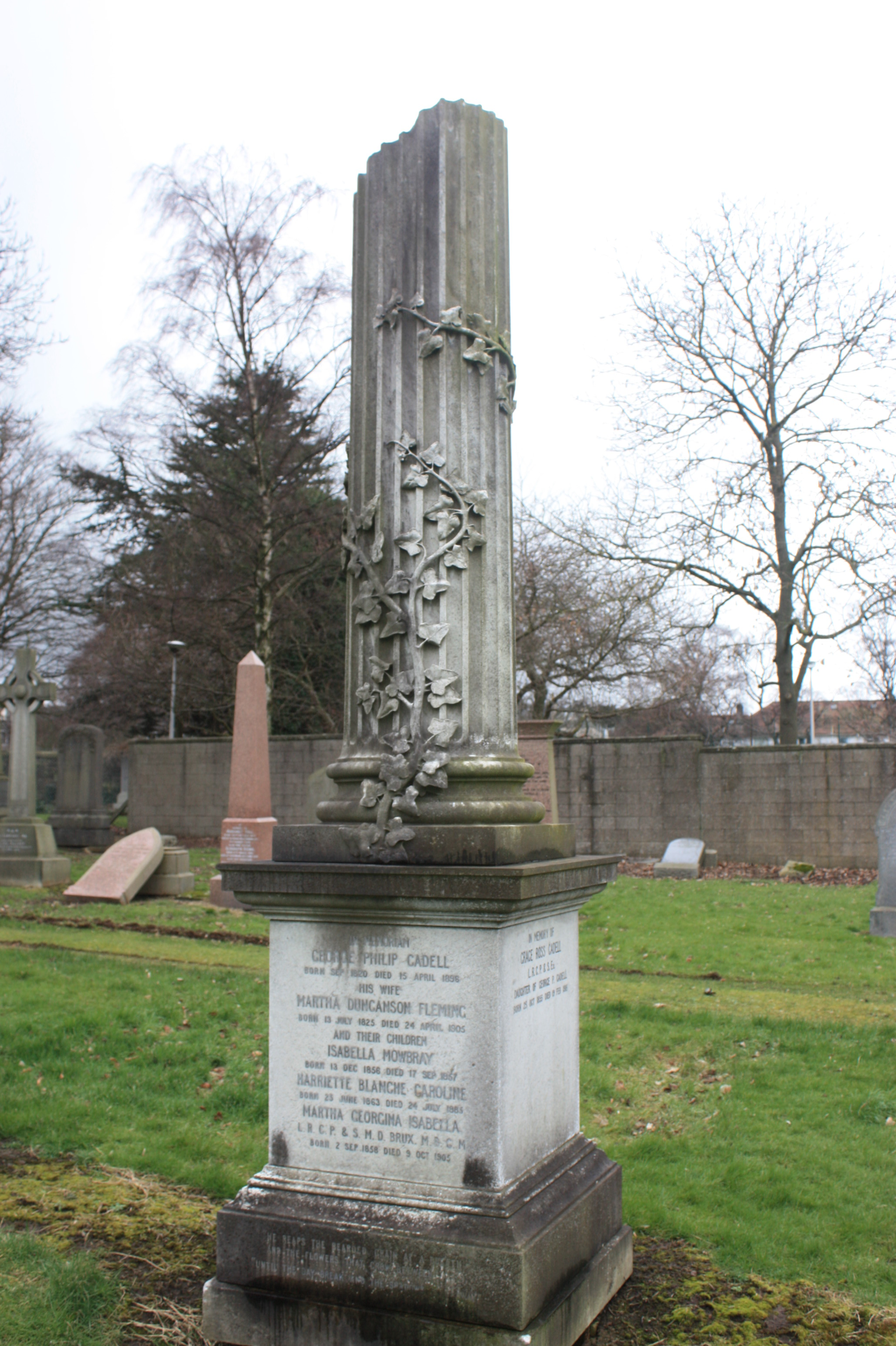
The Cadell grave, Morningside Cemetery, Edinburgh

Grace Ross Cadell (October 25, 1855 – February 19, 1918) was a Scottish medical doctor and suffragist, and one of the first group of women to study medicine in Scotland and qualify.

She was, with Elsie Inglis, one of the initial entrants to the Edinburgh School of Medicine for Women, set up by Sophia Jex-Blake in 1886. She stood up to Jex-Blake over a disciplinary matter, being dismissed from the school, and subsequently successfully sued Jex-Blake and her school. Her career as a physician and surgeon was devoted mainly to the care of women and children.

She became an active suffragette and was well known for public acts of defiance in the cause of women's suffrage. She was prominent in providing medical care and refuge for her fellow suffragettes, some of whom were released into her care directly from episodes of force feeding in prison. Her home became well known as a sanctuary for suffragettes.

== Early life and education ==
Grace Ross Cadell was born on 25 October 1855, the oldest of four daughters of George Philip Cadell of Carriden, Bo'ness, who was superintendent of the local coalworks, and his wife, Martina Duncanson Fleming.

In 1887, with her sister, Martha Georgina Cadell, she became one of the students in the first intake at the Edinburgh School of Medicine for Women, which had been established by Sophia Jex-Blake in 1886. The lectures were given in the school's premises in Surgeons' Square and clinical teaching at Leith Hospital.

Jex-Blake was regarded by her students as a strict disciplinarian, and her rules required that the students leave Leith Hospital by 5 pm. On 8 June 1888, Grace and Martha Cadell, along with Elizabeth Christie and Ida Balfour, stayed in the hospital after this hour to follow a patient with a head injury. When Jex-Blake learned of this breach of her rules, she expelled Grace and Martha Cadell from the School.

Their response was to bring an action for damages against Jex-Blake and the School. The sisters claimed £500 in damages, and the court found in their favour, awarding each £50 in damages in July 1890. The resulting publicity was a major setback for Jex-Blake and her School. Elsie Inglis, a fellow student, had been unhappy with the handling of the affair and left the school in 1889. With the help of her father, John Inglis, a keen supporter of medical education for women, she established the Edinburgh College of Medicine for Women in Chambers Street. Inglis and the Cadell sisters became students at the college. The Cadell sisters did well academically, with Martha winning the medal for midwifery and Grace the medal for medical jurisprudence.

Grace Cadell qualified in 1891 after passing the examinations for the 'Triple Qualification' of LRCPE, LRCSE, and LFPSG (although, like many of her contemporaries, she chose to abbreviate this to LRCP&SEd). This qualification had been set up jointly by the three Scottish Medical Royal Colleges to allow those not able to enter university to sit exams equivalent to those sat by university students. This enabled her name to go on to the Medical Register and allowed her to practise as a doctor. Women did not graduate in medicine from a Scottish University until 1894.

== Career ==
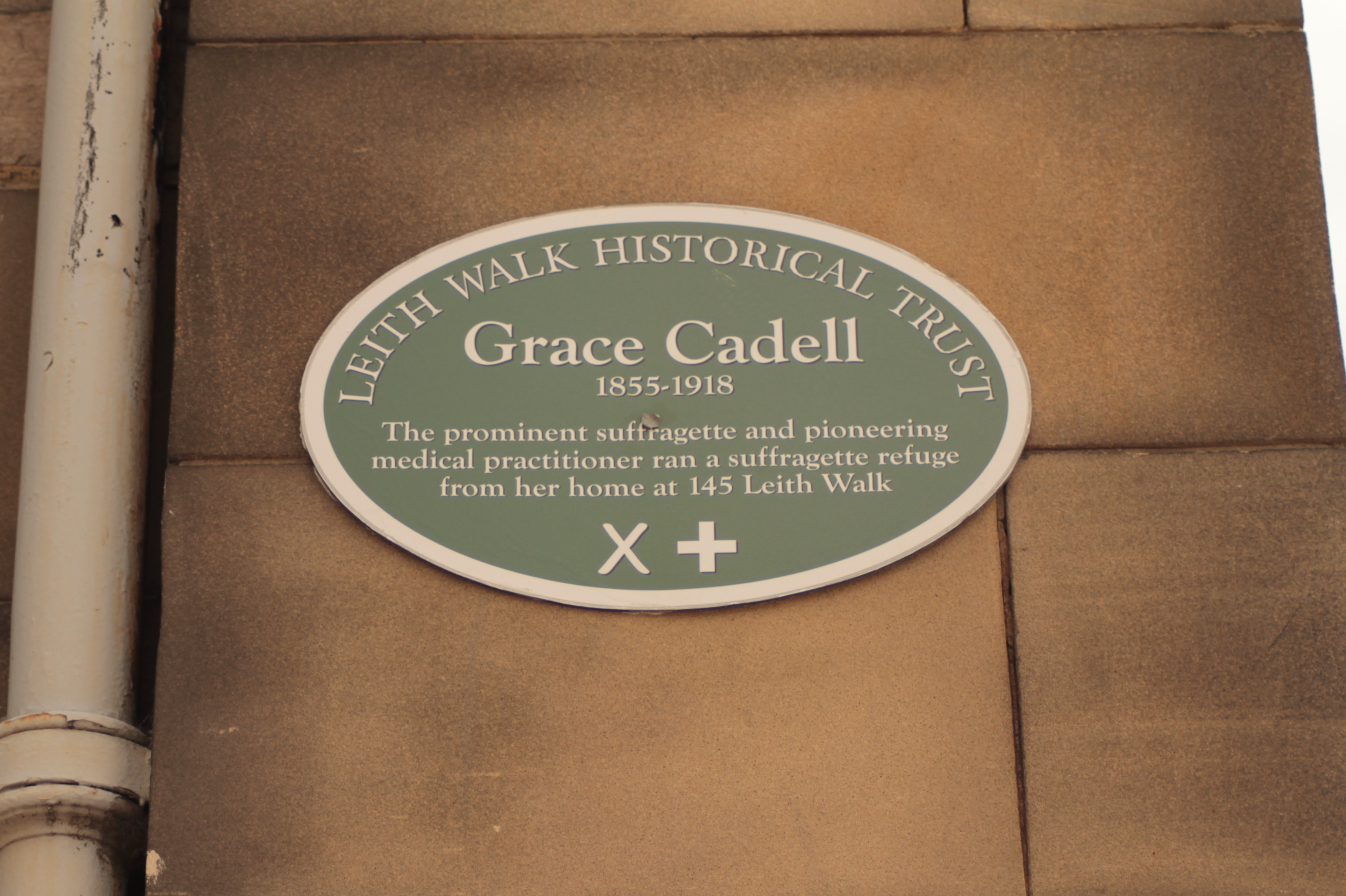
Plaque to Grace Cadell on Leith Walk

=== Medical career ===
Jex-Blake had established the Edinburgh Hospital for Women and Children, at Bruntsfield, which would later become Bruntsfield Hospital. This had an entirely female staff and the newly qualified Cadell was appointed as surgical resident.

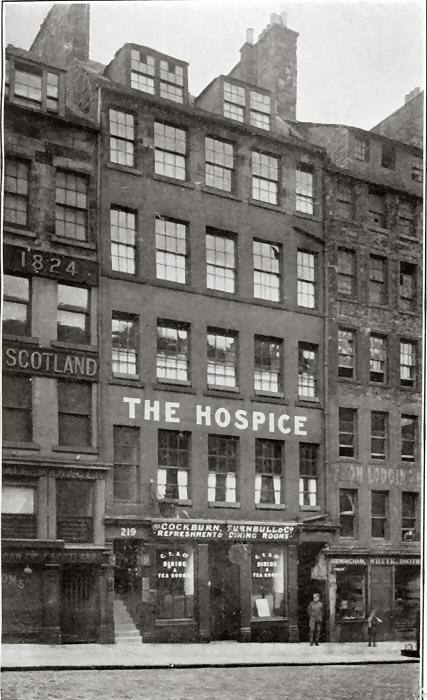
The Hospice on Edinburgh's Royal Mile

In 1899, when Elsie Inglis created the Medical Women's Club, set up with the prime aim of starting a hospital for women, Grace Cadell was a prominent member of the club and subsequently served on the medical committee of the hospital, which was opened at 11 George Square. In 1904 she joined the staff of The Hospice, on the Royal Mile, a hospital for women and children which had been set up by Elsie Inglis. She specialised in obstetrics and gynaecology and in 1911 she took over directorship of the whole clinic. She later became registrar at the New Hospital for Women in London.

=== Suffrage activities ===
On 9 October 1909, Cadell was one of the many suffragettes on the public procession in Edinburgh demanding Votes for Women, locally named the "Gude Cause".

An active suffragette she was president of the Leith branch of the Women's Social and Political Union (WSPU) in 1907 before re-aligning to the newly created Women's Freedom League (WFL). In 1912 as a result of refusing to pay taxes as a protest, her furniture was seized and publicly sold at the Mercat Cross on the Royal Mile. She turned the gathering into a suffrage meeting. During the Scottish Suffrage Campaign of 1913-14 (which involved attacks on specific buildings) she was medical advisor to those on hunger strike in prison.

Under the Cat and Mouse Act 1913 this often meant prisoners were released into her personal care to recover. Ethel Moorhead was infamously released into her care following force-feeding at Calton Jail, as were both Edith Hudson and Arabella Scott.

In another act of rebellion Cadell refused to stamp the insurance cards of her five servants and was fined £50 by Lord Salvesen in the Glasgow High Court. The trial made the newspapers due to fellow-suffragettes throwing apples at the judge (but hitting one of the jurors), at the sentencing of other suffragettes for arson. Cadell paid her fine with a sackful of copper coins as a further defiance.

Her house at 145 Leith Walk was a refuge for suffragettes. It stood just north of Smiths Place but was demolished to create a printworks (Allander House). She never married but during the course of the First World War she adopted four children. In July 1914 she attended the trial at Edinburgh Sherriff Court of Maude Edwards, who was charged with slashing the portrait of King George V on display at the Royal Scottish Academy. Edwards was found guilty by Sheriff Maconochie and sentenced to three months imprisonment in Perth Prison (Perth being harder for her suffragette friends in Edinburgh to attend or to be a nuisance). Cadell was forcibly removed by three constables during the trial for causing an affray but was not arrested.

== Death and legacy ==
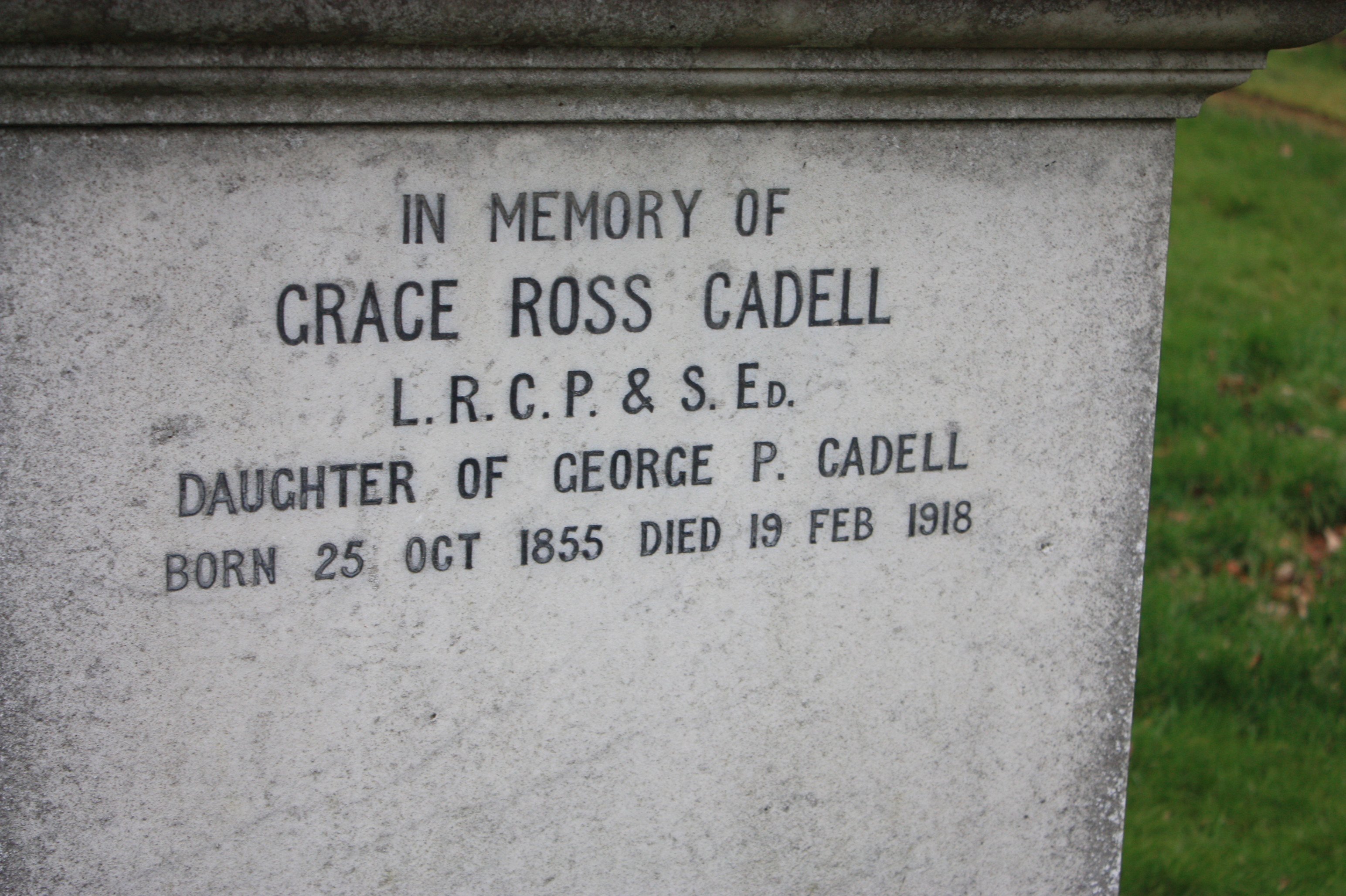
The inscription to Grace Cadell in Morningside Cemetery, Edinburgh

She died at Mosspark House, on the Rumbling Bridge road at Yetts o'Muckhart, on 19 February 1918. She was buried with her parents and sisters in Morningside Cemetery.

In her will, she left over £50,000 plus property and movable assets, a considerable sum at that time. This was left partly to charity, to remaining family and partly to her four adoptive children, only one of whom, Grace Emmeline Cadell, took her surname. The others were Margaret Frances Clare Sydney, George Bell, and Maurice Philip Shaw. Grace Emmeline was clearly named after Emmeline Pankhurst and is thought to have been adopted as a new-born from a young girl at the Magdalene House in Edinburgh, where unwed girls would have their children removed and made to work in workhouse conditions as "punishment" for becoming pregnant. The other three (older children) are thought to have been from Dean Orphanage on the west of the city. The will gave all £150 per annum for the remainder of their lives, around four or five times the average annual salary at the time.

In 2009, a re-enactment of the sale of Grace Cadell's furniture was held at the Mercat Cross in Edinburgh. The re-enactment was staged by actors of the Citadel Arts Group to promote their play What Women want which depicted suffrage events in Scotland and featured Grace Cadell's story.

In 2022 the Leith Walk Historical Trust erected a plaque close to the location of her house on Leith Walk.

== Personal life ==
Her niece Isobel Cadell (1890–1971) married Harry MacDonald Simson, cousin of the eminent physician Sir Henry Simson, himself a cousin of Elsie Inglis, making Elsie her second cousin.

== See also ==
- List of suffragists and suffragettes
- Edinburgh Seven
