= Mona Chalmers Watson =

British physician and head of the Women's Army Auxiliary Corps

Chief Controller Mona Chalmers Watson CBE
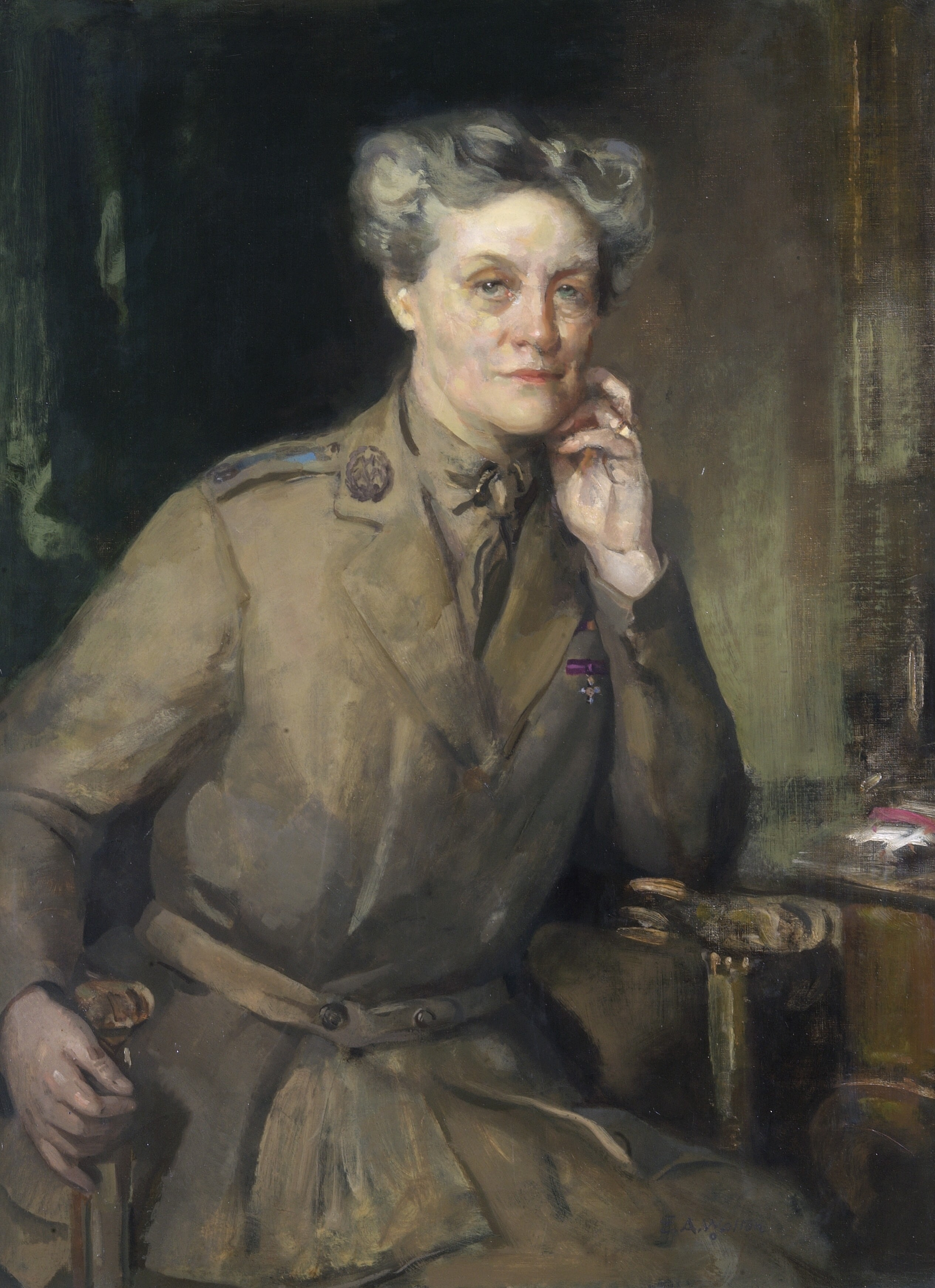
- Chalmers Watson in Queen Mary's Auxiliary Army Corps uniform
- Born: Alexandra Mary Campbell Geddes; 31 May 1872; British India
- Died: 7 August 1936 (aged 64); Frensham, Rolvenden, Kent, England
- Occupations: Physician; Nutritionist; Head, Women's Army Auxiliary Corps (during World War I)
- Relatives: Eric Geddes (brother); Auckland Geddes (brother)

Alexandra Mary Chalmers Watson CBE (née Geddes; 31 May 1872 – 7 August 1936), known as Mona Chalmers Watson, was a British physician and head of the Women's Army Auxiliary Corps. The first woman to receive an MD from the University of Edinburgh, she helped found the Elsie Inglis Hospital for Women, was the first president of the Edinburgh Women's Citizen Association, a staff physician and later senior physician at the Edinburgh Hospital and Dispensary for Women and Children, and co-edited the Encyclopaedia Medica with her husband, Douglas Chalmers Watson. At the time of her death in 1936, she was president of the Medical Women's Federation, having been elected May 1935.

== Early life and education ==
Alexandra Mary Campbell Geddes was born in India on 31 May 1872, a daughter of Auckland Campbell Geddes (1831–1908), a civil engineer, and Christina Helen MacLeod Geddes (née Anderson; 1850–1914). Chalmers Watson was the eldest of five children in the Geddes family; among her siblings were Eric Geddes and Auckland Geddes, 1st Baron Geddes. From 1888 to 1890 she was educated at St Leonard's School in St Andrews, Scotland. When she turned her focus towards the study of medicine, it was the latest in a lengthy familial interest in the profession: her mother supported Christian Guthrie Wright and Louisa Stevenson in the foundation of the Edinburgh School of Cookery and Domestic Economy (later Queen Margaret University), and been an early campaigner on behalf of the cause of medical education for women. Through her mother Chalmers Watson also claimed kinship to Elizabeth Garrett Anderson, the first woman to qualify as a doctor in England, and her maternal aunt, Mary Marshall (née Anderson) had been one of the original women admitted to study medicine alongside Sophia Jex-Blake at the University of Edinburgh in 1871, later qualifying in Paris.

At this time women studying medicine risked social isolation, 'contemptuous glances' and 'sneering remarks'.

Chalmers Watson began her medical education in 1891 at the Edinburgh College of Medicine for Women, which had been established by Elsie Inglis, later a noted suffragist, and her father John Inglis. She graduated MB CM from the University of Edinburgh in 1896.

The same day that she received her MD, Mona Geddes became Dr Mona Chalmers Watson, marrying Dr Douglas Chalmers Watson that afternoon; she had delayed the wedding until she could write MD after her name. Together they had two sons, Rupert and Irvine. After their marriage, both Chalmers Watsons set up a private practice together in Edinburgh at 11 Walker St, which they shared until 1914.

== Career ==
After her graduation, Chalmers Watson spent a year in London working as a physician at the Maternity District Association at Plaistow; she also spent six months working at Dr Barnardo's Homes in Kent.

Chalmers Watson's experience working in Plaistow, where her record consisted of more than 1000 confinements with a mortality rate of just over 1 per 1000, informed the topic of her MD thesis when she returned to Edinburgh the following year. Chalmers Watson obtained her MD on 30 July 1898 from the University of Edinburgh's Medical College, the first woman to do so; fellow University of Edinburgh alumna Jessie MacLaren MacGregor did not receive her MD until 1899.

The Chalmers Watsons edited the Encyclopaedia Medica, a 15 volume work, the first edition of which appeared in 1900. As well as helping edit the encyclopaedia, she had contributed an article on the feeding of invalids. She published a further two books with her husband, Food and Feeding in Health and Disease (1910) and The Book of Diet (1913). While the couple ran their practice, Chalmers Watson also worked at the Edinburgh Hospital and Dispensary for Women and Children. which later became Bruntsfield Hospital; she had been appointed to the medical staff in 1900, eventually becoming a senior physician.

Mona Chalmers Watson was a suffragette supporter, and treated suffragette prisoners on release from hunger strike and force-feeding in Perth Prison.

=== Women's Army Auxiliary Corps ===
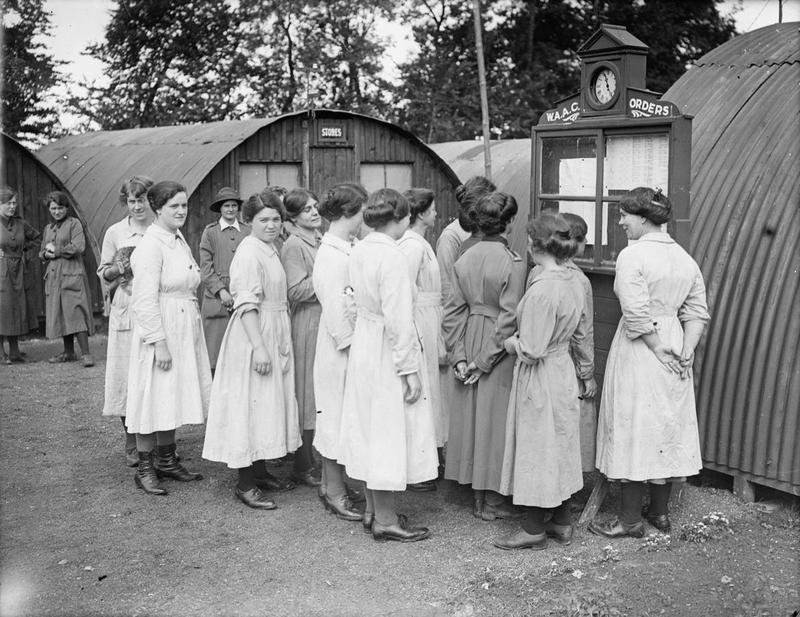
The Women's Army Auxiliary Corps in France during the First World War.

From the beginning of the First World War, women in Scotland typically worked in the nursing or munitions industries, occasionally running field hospitals and soup canteens or driving ambulances with the First Aid Nursing Yeomanry, which was established in 1907. By 1916, Chalmers Watson advocated for the creation of a corps of women volunteers who could undertake additional ancillary, non-combatant duties. At this time, Chalmers Watson's brother, Brigadier-General Sir Auckland Geddes, was the Director of Recruiting at the War Office, and he arranged for Chalmers Watson to meet with Sir Nevil Macready, the adjutant-general, on 26 January 1917 to set out her proposal for the formation of the corps. On 7 July 1917, the Women's Army Auxiliary Corps (WAAC) was formally instituted; Macready had requested that Chalmers Watson be its first Chief Controller and senior officer some months earlier, in February 1917. She was appointed at a rank equivalent of a brigadier-general and paid an annual salary of £500. The organisation headquarters was Devonshire House, Piccadilly, London. She issued a recruiting pamphlet calling on 'every strong healthy and active woman not employed on work of national importance' to volunteer. Selecting as her deputy Helen Gwynne-Vaughan, Chalmers Watson raised a corps of 40,850 women, of whom some 17,000 served overseas (although never more than 8,777 at a time).

She regarded the creation of the WAAC as "an advance of the women's movement and... a national advance" and noted that for the first time, "women [had] a direct and officially recognised share in the task of our armies both at home and overseas." In a recruiting pamphlet she wrote that "this is the great opportunity for every strong, healthy and active woman not already employed on work of national importance to offer her services to her country." Although Chalmers Watson had to resign as Chief Controller of the WAAC in 1918 when one of her sons fell ill after an appendectomy, her efforts had already set a precedent that would be followed – and expanded upon – during the Second World War, laying the foundation for the Auxiliary Territorial Service, which became the Women's Royal Army Corps in 1949.

Her work organising the WAAC was recognised by the award of (one of the first) CBEs in 1917, and the Ladies' Pictorial on 20 February 1918 said she had "nobly done her bit".

Chalmers Watson's portrait was included in the National War Museum, London (now the Imperial War Museum), at the time of her death.

=== Politics ===
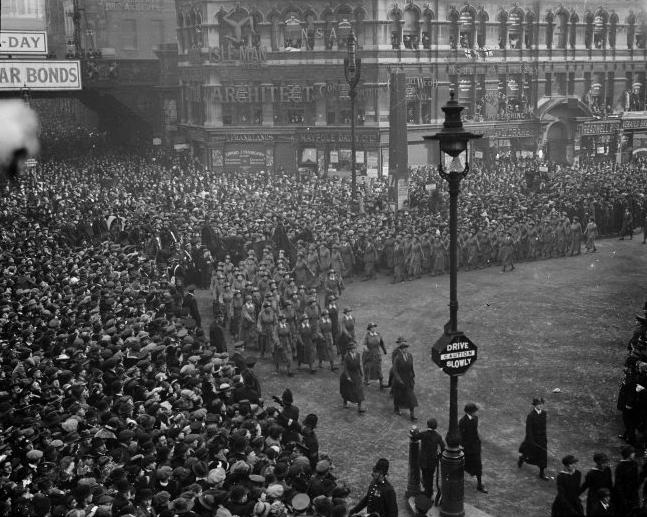
WAACs marching in London, 1918

Chalmers Watson was a noted suffragette, and while her own involvement did not include the militant actions of some of her peers, her support was not passive, whilst during the establishment of the WAAC, she had concentrated on equality in improving the levels of pay offered to the women taking over men's jobs. Chalmers Watson was a cousin of suffragette doctor, Louisa Garrett Anderson and whilst in London, was a follower of Millicent Fawcett, and then herself served as a doctor for the suffragette prisoners in Perth, who had been on hunger-strike and force fed. Many leaders and key funders of the women's hospital services in World War One were drawn from medical and nursing teams who had been active across the British pro-suffrage movement with over 538 women doctors supporting the right to vote, and only 15 against. Later in her life Chalmers Watson put politics aside when working on improving health care in Scotland, with anti-suffragist Kitty Murray, who went on to become a Conservative M.P.

Chalmers Watson was a director of the Time and Tide Publishing Company.

When the Representation of the People Act, 1918 gave the vote to 8.4 million women, Chalmers Watson became the first president of the Edinburgh Women Citizens' Association, which strongly advocated continuing to improve the scope of female suffrage, by 'extensive lobbying, campaigning and educational work and a remarkable breadth of interests, including straightforwardly ‘equality’ issues such as women’s representation in local and central government, the extension of the franchise to women on the same terms as men,'.

Chalmers Watson was also closely involved in the establishment of the Women's United Services Club in Drumsheugh Gardens, Edinburgh, and at the time of her death in 1936, she was its president. Chalmers Watson had been one of the founders of the Child Assault Protest Committee (1920).

In The Scotsman's obituary notice, published 8 August 1936, the response to her death was said to be a "stunned reaction" characterised by "the inevitable thought – What are all the women's organisations in Edinburgh going to do without her? Societies, hospitals, Queen's Nurses Boards were upheld by her support and inspired by her practical energy." She had been involved in the Queen Mary Nursing Home and the founding of the Elsie Inglis Hospital for Women as well as the Patriotic Emergency Food League and the Women's Emergency Corps., the latter as honorary secretary.

=== Later career ===
In her later career, Chalmers Watson became a member of the Advisory Committee on Nutrition and was an expert member on the Scottish Board of Health's Consultative Councils throughout the 1920s She was also a member of the Standing Committee on Scottish Health Sciences, having been appointed by the Department of Health for Scotland in 1933. The Cathcart Report issued by the Committee on Scottish Health Services has been seen as a model for post-war British medical services and helped lay the foundation for a unique Scottish health system.

In June 1935, she was appointed a member of the Advisory Committee on Diet by the Minister of Health and the Secretary of State for Scotland; the aim of this committee was described as being "to inquire into the facts, quantitative and qualitative, in relation to the diet of the people, and report as to any changes therein which appear desirable in the light of modern advances in the knowledge of nutrition." Her political desire to further the cause of women in medicine saw her take on a number of prominent positions towards the end of her life, and she was president of both the Scottish Women's Medical Association and the British Women's Medical Federation, having been elected to the latter some months before her death.

Looking back over her career, she was reported to have felt it was 'an honour to have lived through such great times for women, and to know that the generation after us will not have the same fight for liberty'.

=== Fenton Barns ===
In 1923, Chalmers Watson and her husband inherited the Fenton Barns farm in North Berwick, East Lothian, where they began breeding a herd of tuberculin-tested cattle. Eventually, they established a model dairy which was responsible for the production of certified milk. The farm became renowned across Europe for its pioneering experiments focused specifically on improving the quality of milk and the production and distribution of certified milk for the safer feeding of children; these included issues surrounding the irradiation of milk, its feeding to premature infants, and the production of milk with a more digestible curd.

== Death and legacy ==
Chalmers Watson died at the home of her brother, Sir Auckland Geddes, in Frensham, Rolvenden, Kent, on 7 August 1936; she was staying with her brother to recuperate from an illness with which she had been coping for some time.

Some months after her death, the relative absence of any commemoration was commented on in a letter to The Scotsman by a T.M. Chapman, who asked,

There now exists, to her and to our unceasing honour, a worthy and beneficent memorial to Dr. Elsie Inglis, which will always keep her name fragrant to numberless sufferers. Why should not something on at least similar lines be devised to commemorate the admittedly grand labours of Mona Geddes? Why not, even should a hospital or a ward be beyond reach, establish one or more beds in her honour—she was on the Board of Management of the Royal Infirmary—or else a bursary or research scholarship for women medical students? So would her memory be kept green and her indomitable courage be a constant inspiration to many earnest workers who—like me—might have very little chance of ever seeing a bronze plaque in a club hall

Three years later, this oversight was to some extent redressed when Chalmers Watson's co-Chief Controller at the WAAC, Dame Helen Gwynne-Vaughan, formally opened a gateway to the Elsie Inglis Memorial Maternity Hospital commemorating Chalmers Watson's life and services to medicine and her country.

A Scotsman article about the opening ceremony noted that immediately after the ribbon was cut, the gateway was "consecrated" by the birth of a baby during an air raid warning; the article quoted Gwynne-Vaughan as saying, "In the old days, a new building was consecrated by the building in of a human being who had therefore died. This was consecrated yesterday by the birth of a baby!" Memorials to Chalmers Watson are recorded in the archive of Memorials to Women in Scotland.
