= Umpherston =

Umpherston is a surname and given name. Notable people with the name include:

- Charles Umpherston Aitchison KCSI CIE (1832–1896), Scottish colonial administrator, Lieutenant Governor of the Punjab
- Alice Marion Umpherston (1863–1957), the first female lecturer at the University of St Andrews
- James Umpherston (1812–1900), farmer and politician, settler of Mount Gambier, South Australia

== See also ==
- Umpherston Sinkhole
- Pumpherston
