= Alice Marion Umpherston =

- Born: 2 June 1863
- Died: 1957 (aged 93–94); Edinburgh, Scotland
- Education: Edinburgh School of Medicine for Women, St Mungo's College
- Scientific career
- Fields: Medicine (Physiology)

Alice Marion Umpherston (2 June 1863 – 1957) was the first woman to be appointed at the University of St Andrews as a university lecturer in 1896 to teach women students Physiology.

== Early life ==
Alice Marion Umpherston was born on 2 July 1863 and was the daughter of William Umpherston and Alison Miller.

Umpherston gained her professional qualifications of Licence of the Royal College of Physicians of Edinburgh (LRCPE), Licence of the Royal College of Surgeons of Edinburgh (LRCSE) and Licentiate of the Faculty of Physicians and Surgeons of Glasgow (LFPSG) at the Edinburgh School of Medicine for Women and St Mungo's College in Glasgow in 1892. She later resided at 6 Elidon Street, Edinburgh between 1932 and 1957.

== Career ==
Umpherston succeeded Sophia Jex-Blake as Attending Medical Officer at the Edinburgh Hospital and Dispensary for Women and Children. She was appointed as the first female lecturer at the University of St. Andrews in 1896 to teach Physiology to women students. The position was for one year, running from 1896 to 1897. She also held a similar position in the North Indian School of Medicine and practised as a doctor in medical missions in the Punjab, after going to India in 1899.

Umpherston died in 1957.
