= Annie Wardlaw Jagannadham =

Indian physician (1864–1894)

- Born: 30 May 1864; Visakhapatnam
- Died: 23 July 1894 (aged 30); Visakhapatnam
- Occupation: Physician

Annie Wardlaw Jagannadham (30 May 1864 – 26 July 1894) was an Indian physician trained at Edinburgh. She was the first Indian woman qualified to practice medicine in Britain.

== Early life ==
Jagannadham was born in Visakhapatnam, one of the six children of Rev. Pulipaka Jagannadham, a Telugu poet, teacher, and Christian missionary, and his wife, Eliza Osborne, a mission teacher, who was also a convert from Hinduism. Her older sister was Eliza Lazarus, married Daniel Lazarus, the headmaster of the Vizagapatam Mission School. Her brother P. Richard Hay Jagannadham was also a doctor trained at Edinburgh. Her niece was Hilda Mary Lazarus (1890–1978), an obstetrician and medical school principal.

== Education and career ==
Jagannadham studied at Madras University, and pursued further training as a physician at Edinburgh School of Medicine for Women, from 1888 to 1890. During her time in Edinburgh, she was a student of Sophia Jex-Blake, who supported scholarships to bring other Indian women students to study medicine in Britain. In 1890, she was awarded the Scottish Triple Qualification and subsequently became the first Indian woman to be registered on the British Medical Register. She also held a certificate in psychological medicine (MPC).

She was house surgeon at the Edinburgh Hospital for Women and Children in 1890. After returning to India, Jagannadham worked as house surgeon at Cama Hospital in Bombay, under hospital head Edith Pechey-Phipson.

== Death ==
Jagannadham caught an illness described as "some painful disease of the throat" while working at the hospital in Bombay, and died in summer 1894, aged 30 years, at her parents' home.
