= Elizabeth Adelaide Baker =

Elizabeth Adelaide Barker
- Born: 15 December 1872; Thaba 'Nchu, Orange Free State, South Africa
- Died: 1 March 1928 (aged 55); Rotherhithe
- Education: Edinburgh School of Medicine for Women, University of Edinburgh
- Occupations: Physician and surgeon
- Years active: 1892 - 1928
- Employer(s): Cutler Boulter Provident Dispensary, Oxford Greenhill House Surgery, Orkney Lady Gomm Memorial Mission House and Accident Hospital, Rotherhithe
- Known for: Women's medical pioneer

Elizabeth Adelaide Baker (15 December 1872 - 1 March 1928) was a Scottish-educated South African physician and surgeon who worked throughout the UK.

== Early life ==
Baker was born on 15 December 1872 in Thaba 'Nchu, Orange Free State, South Africa, to Methodist teachers George and Adelaide Eliza Baker (née Prideaux). After moving to Scotland, Baker was educated at Anderson's College, Edinburgh, where she was awarded a Second Class Society of Arts Certificate in Music at 1885 at the age of 12. The following year she was awarded a Third Class certificate.

== Medical education ==
In 1887, at the age of 15, Baker enrolled to study medicine at the Edinburgh School of Medicine for Women. In 1889 she was one of two women to pass the First Surgical and Medical Examination. She passed the Second Surgical and Medical Examination the following year and was also awarded a prize for practical anatomy. In April 1892 she passed the Quarterly Examination for the Triple Qualification. Of 101 candidates, 48 passed. Barker was one of two women to do so, the other being Susan Grace Dougall of Montreal. This qualification enabled Baker to register as a medical practitioner with the Royal College of Physicians and Surgeons of Edinburgh and Glasgow. Baker is recorded as living in Newcastle-on-Tyne at this time.

== Medical career ==
Baker moved to Oxford and took up residence at Christ Church Terrace in 1894 near St Hilda's College, which had been founded the previous year by Dorothea Beale. Three years later in 1897 she is listed by Jackson's Oxford Journal as having been appointed as medical officer at the new Cutler Boulter Provident Dispensary.

=== Royal College of Physicians and Surgeons of Glasgow Fellowship application ===
In 1896 Baker became the first woman to apply to become a Fellow of the Royal College of Physicians and Surgeons of Glasgow. As she had been awarded the Triple Qualification, Baker was already a licentiate of both the Faculty of Physicians and Surgeons of Glasgow and the Royal Colleges of Physicians and Surgeons of Edinburgh, however a "post-registrable qualification", such as Fellowship, was required to be able to apply for senior posts including teaching roles and positions within hospitals. Baker's application was refused on the grounds that the Medical Amendment Act of 1876 only allowed women to hold "registrable qualifications". In addition, the Faculty judged that use of the words "brethren" and "gentlemen" in their Charter implicitly excluded women.

In 1900 The Medical Register records Baker as living in Attercliffe, Sheffield. She also worked for a time at Greenhill House Surgery, Orkney in 1901. In 1913 Baker moved to Rotherhithe, where she lived with her sister, Ellen Scott Baker, a nursing sister, and two lodgers, including Helen Shaw, a physician and surgeon. The London Panel of Doctors elected her to their executive committee the same year. Baker remained in Rotherhithe working at the Lady Gomm Memorial Mission House and Accident Hospital until her death in 1928.

== Death and memorials ==
Baker died at Rotherhithe in 1928 at the age of 55 and was cremated at Lambeth.

In 2025 Baker was commemorated with a blue plaque at St Hilda's College as the "first female doctor to practice in the City of Oxford". She was also commemorated as part of an art installation at the Royal College of Physicians and Surgeons of Glasgow titled "Admitting Women".
