= Jessie MacLaren MacGregor =

Physician

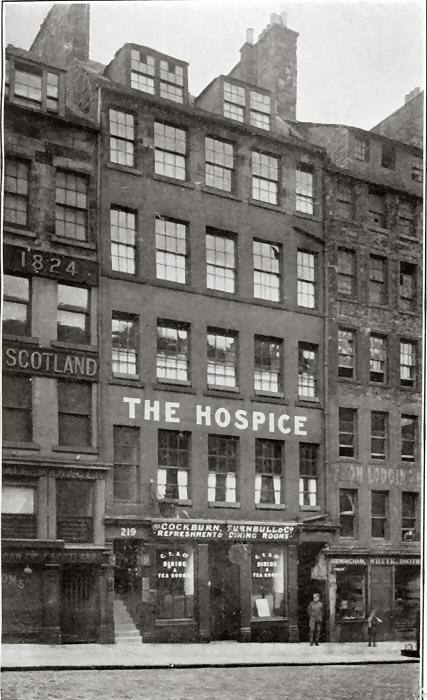
- The Hospice, 219 High Street – the maternity hospital Dr MacGregor established with Dr Elsie Inglis.
- Born: 7 May 1863; Edinburgh, Scotland
- Died: 22 March 1906 (aged 42); Denver, Colorado, United States
- Education: University of Edinburgh
- Medical career
- Profession: Physician
- Sub-specialties: Obstetrics

Jessie MacLaren MacGregor (7 May 1863 – 22 March 1906) was one of the first women to be awarded an MD from the University of Edinburgh in 1899. Along with Elsie Inglis she was instrumental in setting up the Muir Hall of Residence for Women Students in Edinburgh, and the Hospice, a nursing home and maternity hospital for poor women.

== Early life and education ==
Jessie MacLaren MacGregor was born 7 May 1863. She was a student of Sophia Jex-Blake at the Edinburgh School of Medicine for Women, and was one of the first women to take a medical degree at the University of Edinburgh, after the barriers to women qualifying as doctors were removed by the University. Having qualified initially with the Triple Qualification (LRCPE, LRCSE, LRFPSG), she took her MBChB (Bachelor of Medicine) degree in 1896, achieving first-class honours in every subject in the curriculum, passing all her professional examinations in the shortest time possible, and being awarded the Arthur Scholarship. Three years later, she took her MD (Doctor of Medicine), winning a gold medal for her thesis on the comparative anatomy of the auditory nerve.

== Career ==
In 1894, she set up a medical practice in Edinburgh with Elsie Inglis at 8 Walker Street. After passing her MD in 1899 she was appointed as Junior Physician to the Edinburgh Hospital for Women and Children, and was also a Registrar and Assistant to the Extra Physicians at the Royal Hospital for Sick Children, Edinburgh. In 1901 along with Elsie Inglis she was involved in setting up The Hospice on the Royal Mile in Edinburgh, a maternity hospital specifically for the care of working class women. She was also elected as a member of the Edinburgh Obstetrical Society in 1901, and was an active member, presenting samples and reading papers at meetings.

In 1905, for family reasons, she left her practice in Edinburgh and emigrated to Denver, Colorado in the United States.

== Death and legacy ==
She died of acute cerebral meningitis on 22 March 1906, in Denver, and is buried in that city's Fairmount Cemetery. In 1908, the Dr Jessie MacGregor Prize in Medical Science was set up as a memorial to her, with a value of £75.
