= Elizabeth Blackburn Ferguson =

- Born: Elizabeth Blackburn Christie; 3 April 1868; Glasgow, Scotland
- Died: 17 January 1901 (aged 32); Tainan, Taiwan
- Occupations: Physician, medical missionary
- Known for: Medical missionary work in Taiwan

Elizabeth Blackburn Ferguson (née Christie; 3 April 1868 – 17 January 1901), also known by her Chinese name as 宋伊莉莎白 (pinyin: ''Sòng Yīlìshābái), was a Scottish physician and medical missionary from Glasgow, who worked in Taiwan from 1892 until her death in 1901. She was an early pioneer of women's healthcare in Taiwan, particularly in the fields of obstetrics and gynaecology.

== Early life and education ==
Elizabeth Blackburn Ferguson was born in Glasgow, Scotland, in 1868, the only daughter of chemist John Christie and Anne Margaret McAra Souter.

Ferguson began her schooling at age five and excelled academically throughout her education. She entered medical school at nineteen, where she ranked first in her final examinations. At the age of twenty-four she obtained the Scottish Triple becoming the first woman from Glasgow to receive the qualification.

== Medical career and life in Taiwan ==
In 1891, Ferguson travelled to Taiwan to prepare for work as a medical missionary. She spent a year learning the local Amoy dialect (now commonly known as Taiwanese Hokkien). During this period, she met Reverend Duncan Ferguson (1860-1923), a fellow Scottish missionary whom she married in Hong Kong on 9 January 1892. The couple subsequently settled in Tainan, where they undertook missionary and medical work.

Ferguson's medical practice focused primarily on women and children, particularly pregnancy and childbirth. At a time when some Taiwanese women were reluctant to seek treatment from male physicians, she provided medical care to patients who might otherwise have had limited access to treatment. Contemporary accounts described her as a dedicated physician who frequently responded to emergency calls and sometimes foregoing sleep and meals to care for patients. Her work contributed towards the introduction of Western-style obstetric and midwifery practises to Taiwan, which was primarily done through foreign female physicians before the establishment of formal midwifery training for Taiwanese women in 1906.

Ferguson and her husband had three children. Their eldest daughter, Hazel Lombay Ferguson was born 4 June 1893 on Xiaoliuqiu, an island off the southwestern coat of Taiwan, followed by their son Ian Grant Ferguson, on 11 October 1894. The couples third child, Graeme Douglas Ferguson was born in Scotland, where the family had returned following Ferguson's illness in 1896.

Ferguson returned to Taiwan in 1898, accompanied by her youngest child, and resumed her medical missionary work. She continued to travel throughout southern Taiwan, visiting rural communities and attending patients in their homes. Her work received financial support from the Women's Missionary Association, which contributed towards the cost of medicines. The association also proposed establishing a hospital specifically for women under her direction, although the plans were never realised. Ferguson continued her medical practice until her final illness in 1900. During her final year of medical practice, Ferguson provided treatment to 5,160 patients.

== Death and commemoration ==
In December 1900, Ferguson became seriously ill while travelling to Muzha in southern Taiwan. After returning to Tainan, received treatment from fellow physicians at Sin-Lau Hospital but her condition did not improve. She remained ill for more than 40 days.

Ferguson died at Sin-Lau Hospital, aged 32. She was buried in the Christian cemetery in Tainan and her name was added to her parents grave in Glasgow.

In 2015, a chapel at the newly constructed Sin-Lau Christian Hospital was named the 'Elizabeth Song Memorial Chapel' in recognition of her medical missionary work in Taiwan.

Following Ferguson's death, her personal belongings were returned to Glasgow, where they remained in the possession of her descendants for several generations. In 2025, her descendant, Reverend John Christie, arranged for a collection of her personal artefacts to be donated to the Presbyterian Church in Taiwan. The collection, which included wood and bamboo carvings, textiles and a framed plaque, was transported to Taiwan by air freight. In April 2026, the artefacts were formally presented to the Taiwan Presbyterian Church Archives at a joint ceremony with Sin-Lau Hospital, marking their return to Taiwan more than a century after Ferguson's death.
