= Edinburgh School of Medicine for Women =

Coordinates: 55.947°N 3.184°W

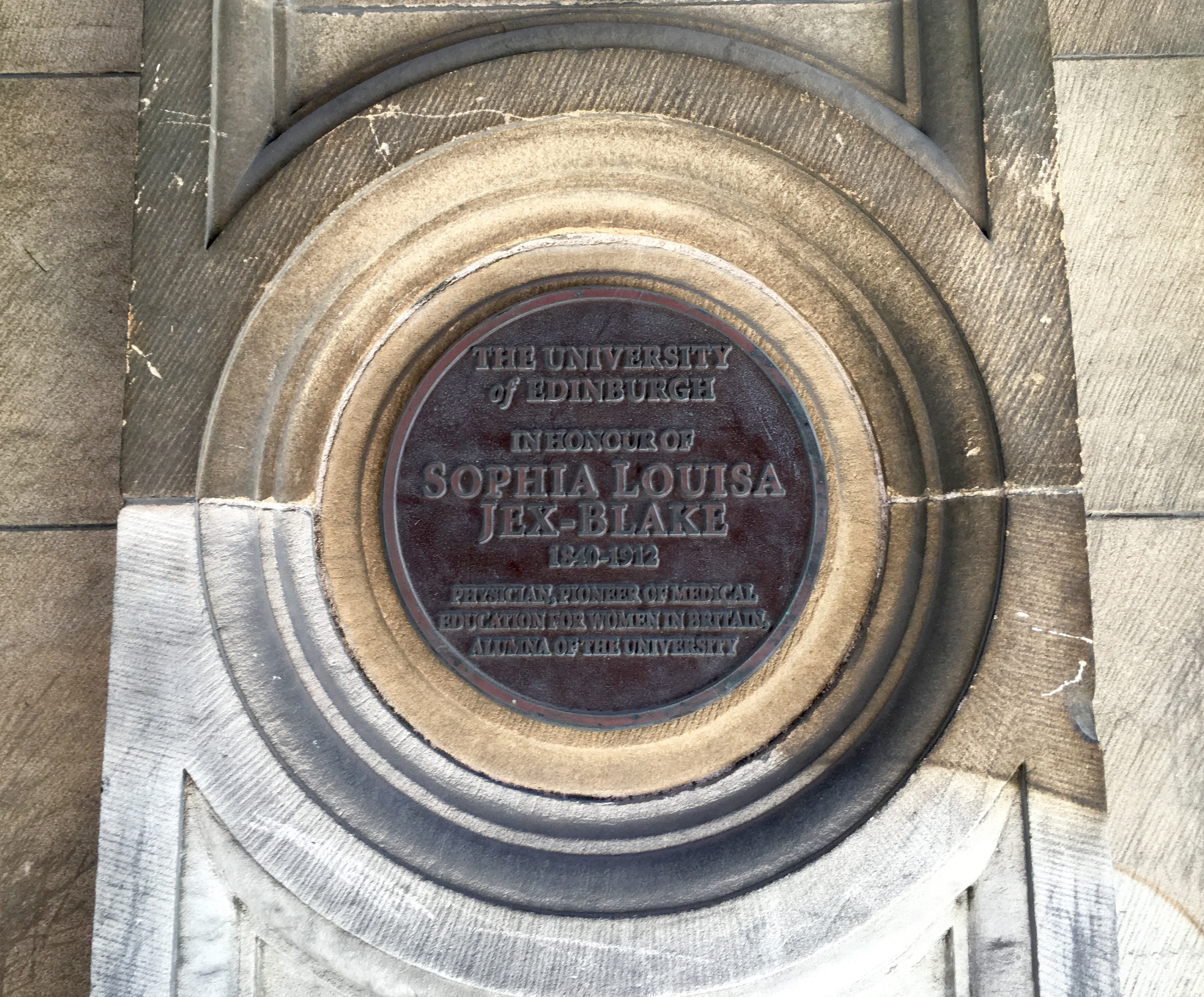
Plaque commemorating Sophia Louisa Jex-Blake's Medical School in Teviot Place, Edinburgh

The Edinburgh School of Medicine for Women was founded by Sophia Jex-Blake in Edinburgh, Scotland, in October 1886, with support from the National Association for Promoting the Medical Education of Women. Sophia Jex-Blake was appointed as both the director and the dean of the school. The first class of women to study at the Edinburgh School of Medicine for Women consisted of eight students, the youngest of whom was nineteen years of age. Throughout its twelve years in operation, the school struggled to find financial funding to remain open. A rival institution, the Edinburgh College of Medicine for Women, set up by the Scottish Association for the Medical Education of Women whose leading members included John Inglis, the father of Elsie Inglis, attracted several students of Jex-Blake, including Martha Cadell and Grace Cadell. St Mungo's College and Queen Margaret College in Glasgow also accepted women medical students and when the Scottish universities began to do so the Edinburgh School of Medicine could no longer compete. The school closed in 1898. Over the twelve years of its operation, the Edinburgh School of Medicine provided education to approximately eighty female students. Of those eighty students, thirty-three completed the full course of medical training at the Edinburgh School while many others chose to finish their education at outside institutions.

== Background about the founder ==
The first step in Sophia Jex-Blake's journey to obtaining entry into a medical program was by requesting permission from Professor JJ Balfour, who served as the dean of the Medical Faculty, to participate in the University of Edinburgh Medical College’s summer classes. Following this request, the faculty at the university voted to determine the fate of Blake and future women’s admission into their medical program. On one hand, she received support in her pursuit of medical education as long as women were educated solely in the field of obstetrics and gynecology. However, other faculty members were opposed to allowing females to study medicine on the foundation of intellectual inferiority. One such individual was Robert Christison, who believed that allowing women to study medicine would diminish the quality of the medical field because women were not only less intelligent than men, but also too fragile to endure the rigorous coursework demanded by such a profession. In spite of some opposition to Sophia Jex-Blake’s request, the faculty vote ended in favor of her admission to the program.

The admission of Sophia Jex-Blake into the University of Edinburgh Medical College did not go without controversy and upheaval from university attendees. After the initial vote granted Jex-Blake admission to the program, Claud Murihead, who worked with the Royal Infirmary, brought forward an appeal to overturn the decision. Backed by a petition signed by approximately 200 students, Murihead’s appeal resulted in a reversal of the decision to admit Jex-Blake. The argument that led to the decision was that men and women should be educated separately, and thus providing courses for a single female student would be inefficient and financially unconscionable.

The fight did not end there, however. During the appeal, Jex-Blake was represented by David Masson, who was both a friend and advocate of her cause. Masson argued that the cost of educating men and women separately could be offset by increasing the number of women enrolled. With a greater number of female medical students, the university would have the resources to provide separate courses for women without producing a financial headache. David Russel, who edited a local newspaper The Scotsman, was a friend to Jex-Blake and published the story regarding the admissions debate as well as Masson’s proposed solution. Inspired by Jex-Blake, more women applied to the University of Edinburgh Medical College.

== The "Edinburgh Seven" ==
After over a decade of refusing to admit women into their medical school, some lecturers at the Extramural School in Edinburgh accepted women into their classes. The “Edinburgh Seven,” consisting of Sophia Jex-Blake, Isabel Thorne, Edith Pechey, Matilda Chaplin, Helen Evans, Mary Anderson, and Emily Bovell were the first women to be admitted into the medical program in 1869. However, acceptance into the program was just the beginning of the challenges they would face. The Edinburgh Seven were charged higher fees than their male counterparts, as a result of smaller class sizes. In addition, while the university had granted their faculty the permission to teach women, it was not a requirement. Professors could refuse to teach female students if they felt it necessary to do so. As a result, these women had to arrange classes on their own instead of being assigned courses by the university program. Furthermore, despite equivalent coursework and lectures, the all-female classes were graded on a different scale than the male classes. This reduced the ability of these women to qualify for scholarships offered by the university based on academic success and achievement.

The grading policy and limitations to available lectures and training were not the only challenges faced by these women. The male students at the university were displeased with the school's decision to admit females into the program. As a result, the male students exhibited aggressive behavior and harassment toward their female counterparts on campus. Tension between the students reached a point of violence, and eventually a riot ensued. As the women arrived to take an anatomy examination, they were met by male student protestors who threw mud at them. The riot was publicized by local newspapers, which fostered public support for the plight faced by the female students. However, the violence had sparked fear at the university and resulted in the decision to allow women to participate in the medical program to be revisited. The university made the decision to revoke the women's admission, and they were declined from the program in the middle of their studies.

== Inspiration for establishment ==
As the opportunity to receive a medical education became increasingly available to women in Edinburgh and abroad, Jex-Blake was inspired to establish her own medical college for female students. Jex-Blake's first step in this endeavor was to notify the National Association for Promoting the Medical Education of Women of her desire to open a school that offered a medical education exclusively to women. However, before she was granted permission to do so by the association, Jex-Blake began reaching out to potential students and publicizing her medical program. Sophia Jex-Blake's intention for this establishment was to cater to the local community in Edinburgh. Thus, she did not include the price of housing in the proposed cost of tuition and books, as it was assumed that most students would be residents in the Edinburgh area and would be living at home.

== History ==
It was ten years since the first UK women had been licensed to practise as doctors, and it would be another six years before Scottish universities would admit women students. Jex-Blake had friends in Edinburgh, as well as opponents, from her earlier unsuccessful campaign to persuade the University of Edinburgh to educate women in their medical school. Lectures took place in the School's premises in Surgeons' Square. The Royal Infirmary, the main teaching hospital, continued to refuse women students. The Royal Infirmary argued that it would produce an undue burden on the hospital staff to make special arrangements specifically for the female students, as it was the main location for the male students undergoing clinical training. As a result, Jex-Blake was forced to search for another institution for her students to be taught, and arranged for them to have clinical teaching at Leith Hospital.

== Closing ==
Jex-Blake's uncompromising approach to discipline led to problems. She was a strict rule enforcer and maintained high expectations for her students. She established strict guidelines for acceptable behavior and conduct during lectures, examinations, and training at the hospital. The academic demands Jex-Blake imposed on her students and her disciplinary persona created a level of tension between the students and herself. Tension came to a head when Jex-Blake expelled two sisters studying at the School without proper grounds. When the two sisters—Ina (Martha Georgina) and Grace Cadell—won the court case challenging their expulsion, the bad publicity meant that both the school and Jex-Blake herself lost support, and some students moved to Glasgow, London and Dublin; the only other places in Great Britain or Ireland where women could study medicine at that time.

Ina and Grace Cadell left the School along with Elsie Inglis, whose father John Inglis was a leading member of the association which set up an alternative medical school for women nearby: the Edinburgh College of Medicine for Women. Jex-Blake wanted to be involved there too, but met resistance, while her relations with Leith Hospital were also becoming strained. The female students would soon be allowed to gain practical experience at the Edinburgh Royal Infirmary, previously blocked to them.

In 1892, Scottish universities opened their doors to women. The ESMW continued for a few more years, advertising

"Science Classes for Ladies - separate classes in botany, zoology and practical chemistry . . . Qualify for Arts and Science Graduation . . . "

The school was never free of financial troubles. Jex-Blake applied for scholarships to support the institution, and The National Association for the Promoting of Medical Education for Women, along with some missionary organizations, helped fund the school. However, competition with the College of Medicine established by Inglis and the Cadell sisters was difficult, and in 1897 Jex-Blake herself was suffering from exhaustion. The following year the school closed, having educated about 80 women from Great Britain, India and elsewhere, with 33 of them completing the full course.

Jessie Macgregor was one of those who stayed for the whole course, achieving distinctions in her examinations. For many years she practised medicine in partnership with Elsie Inglis, and later was a medical officer at the Edinburgh Hospital and Dispensary for Women and Children.

== Notable lecturers ==
- John William Ballantyne, obstetrician, lectured in midwifery from 1890 to 1916

== Notable students ==
- Elizabeth Adelaide Baker: physician and surgeon; first woman to apply for Fellowship of the Royal College of Physicians and Surgeons of Glasgow.
- Margaret Ida Balfour: doctor and campaigner for women's health in India
- Meher Naoroji, the first Indian woman to graduate with a medical degree from the University of Edinburgh. She was also the granddaughter of Dadabhai Naoroji, an Indian political leader and scholar, who was a founding member of the Indian National Congress and the first person of Asian descent elected to the British Parliament.
- Mona Chalmers Watson: first woman to graduate M.D. from the University of Edinburgh; first Chief Controller of the Women's Army Auxiliary Corps
- Jessie MacLaren MacGregor: second woman to graduate M.D. from the University of Edinburgh; along with Elsie Inglis, co-founder of Muir Hall of Residence for Women Students in Edinburgh, and the Hospice
- Annie Wardlaw Jagannadham: first Indian woman registered to practice medicine in Scotland

== See also ==
- Women in medicine
- London School of Medicine for Women
