= Elizabeth Latto Ewan =

- Elizabeth Latto Ewan plaque in Chapel Street

Elizabeth Latto Ewan (1875 - 28 September 1965) was the first female general practitioner in Aberdeen, Scotland.

== Early life ==
Ewan was born in Fyvie, Scotland as the daughter of the Reverend of the Free Church. Both of her parents were also born in Scotland. Ewan received her medical education at Edinburgh Medical College for Women. She took the Scottish triple qualification in 23 October 1895 as the youngest recipient after winning many academic honours. She continue her academic journey by taking the specialisation in midwifery and women's diseases in Dublin and Glasgow. She returned to Aberdeen and open her medical practice. Then, she was married to George Gibb, a physician in Aberdeen, and gave her own practice up to assist her husband in his practice. She retained her own patients within the practice after her husband's death in 1942, which was taken over by her son, and she continued to practise to the end. Ewan and Gibb had two sons and four daughters, both sons and two daughters becoming doctors; the third daughter was a nurse in the Red Cross prior to her marriage, and the fourth break the tradition to be a botanist.

== Career ==
She was known as the first female general practitioner while working near the main centre of Aberdeen. She opened the first Ladies Medical Practice at 26 Chapel Street in Aberdeen (then commemorated by a plaque) in 1896. She also worked for the Colonial Mutual Assurance Society as a medical examiner at the same time. This event was causing some antagonism among conservative male colleagues. The beginning of her career was hard. She started a practice only for women patients in a house owned by her family, offering care to poorer women who struggled to access it. The practice (now known as Westburn Medical Group) was going on for a century and only had women senior partners. Dr Anne Mercer Watson, joined by Dr Laura Sandeman, then taken over Ewan practice.

== Achievements ==
Ewan joined the British Medical Association as the first female member in 1898. In 1896, Ewan was mentioned in Bon Accord Magazine, "The New Woman is asserting herself". A lady doctor has taken up her quarters in Chapel Street'. She is commemorated by a plaque at 26 Chapel Street.
