= Dagmar Berne =

Australian medical doctor (1866 – 1900)

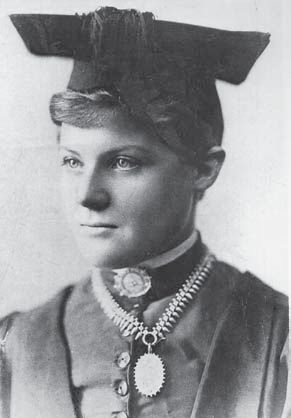
- Born: 16 November 1866; Bega
- Died: 22 August 1900 (aged 33); Trundle
- Alma mater: University of London; Royal Free Hospital; Rotunda Hospital
- Occupation: Medical doctor
- Awards: Victorian Honour Roll of Women (2001)

Georgina Dagmar Berne LRCP FRCSE (16 November 1866 – 22 August 1900) was an Australian medical doctor and the first female student to study medicine in Australia.

== Early life ==
Berne was born in Bega, New South Wales on 16 November 1866, the eldest daughter of eight children. Her father, a migrant to Australia from Denmark, died when Berne was young when attempting to save a drowning man in the Bega River, but he drowned himself. Her mother's second husband, a pastoralist, died when Berne was a teenager, prompting the family to move to Sydney.

== Education ==
=== Schooling ===
Berne's mother, Georgina Kenyon, intended to give all her children a good education. Berne was enrolled in the Springfield Ladies' College in Potts Point. Unsatisfied with the subjects on offer – which included needlework, deportment and dancing – Berne persuaded her mother to arrange private tutoring, and left school aged 17 to study chemistry privately.

=== Private school ===
Berne sat the university entrance exams the following year, and originally thought she had failed, so decided to set up a private school for girls, to be run by herself and her 16-year-old sister Florence. The sisters found premises in the southern suburb of Tempe, prepared materials, and interviewed families of prospective students, before Berne unexpectedly was informed she had passed the entrance exams and was admitted to study at the University of Sydney, just days before the school she and her sister founded was scheduled to open. Florence Berne continued without her elder sister, and taught a school of six students, including two of the younger Berne sisters.

=== First woman to study medicine in Australia ===
Berne enrolled at university in 1885, originally studying the arts, but transferring to medicine in 1886 when a position opened in the third intake of 15 students.

Berne became the first woman to study medicine in Australia, against the protests of the Dean of Medicine, Professor Anderson Stuart, one of several senior staff at the university who questioned the admission of female students, despite outwardly accepting it. She had a successful first year of medicine, gaining honours in anatomy, botany, chemistry, and zoology. However, she not pass an examination in her second year. Some writers have suggested that Stuart deliberately failed Berne or gave her lower marks because he did not want a woman to graduate in medicine. Others have suggested that despite immense dedication, Berne struggled to keep up with other students due to her lack of access to secondary education in science subjects.

Berne met English doctor Elizabeth Garrett Anderson (the second woman in the world to gain registration to practice as a doctor, after Elizabeth Blackwell), who was visiting Australia on a lecture tour in 1888. Berne told her of her difficulties studying medicine in Australia, and Garrett Anderson recounted her own experience while studying. She had not been allowed to finish her studies in England and had finished her education at the University of Paris instead. Inspired by Garrett Anderson's similar experience, Berne and her mother approached the Vice-Chancellor of the university, Sir Henry McLaurin for help in qualifying for her degree; but he refused, asserting that no woman would graduate in medicine while he was Vice-Chancellor.

=== Departing Australia ===
Berne decided to leave Australia, but not before telling Professor Stuart goodbye and informing him of her plan to finish her studies overseas; Stuart tried to dissuade her from studying further, patting her on the head and saying "you're far too nice a girl to practice medicine." She sailed for England, along with her sister Florence, who had decided to give up teaching and also study medicine. The sisters had inherited some money and could afford to live in London; although their mother had advised them to leave the majority of their money safely in Australia, so they lived on a fairly modest budget. Berne joined the Royal Free Hospital, a teaching hospital, in 1889.

She sat the exams of the Worshipful Society of Apothecaries in 1891 and passed with excellent marks in anatomy and physiology, and proceeded on to the final portion of her studies at the University of London. Florence joined the university, having passed the entrance exam. While successful at the university, Dagmar often suffered from pneumonia and pleurisy due to her meagre living conditions, and so she decided to return to Sydney once she had completed her education to gain some experience in practice.

=== Final year of study ===
During Berne's final year of study, the economic downturn in Australia of the early 1890s caused the family to lose all of their savings. This included the loss of the inheritances of Berne and Florence; the sisters' other siblings had been forced to work to support the family, their brother Frederick having to quit school. The sisters could no longer afford to support themselves while studying, and so Florence, without informing Berne, took a job as a governess based on her teaching experience. Although Berne protested this sacrifice, she ultimately completed her education, graduating in 1893. She obtained the Triple Qualification, the Scottish variant of the Conjoint qualification, comprising a joint diploma from the Royal College of Physicians of Edinburgh, the Royal College of Surgeons of Edinburgh and the Royal College of Physicians and Surgeons of Glasgow.

== Career ==
She was one of eighteen Australian women licensed to practice in Scotland in the 19th century, and one of eleven thereof to obtain the Triple Qualification.

Following this, Berne worked at a hospital in the London suburb of Tottenham as a resident, before returning to Australia in 1895. On 9 January 1895, Berne registered to practise as a doctor with the Medical Board of New South Wales. Previous women to register in Australia included Dr. Constance Stone, Victoria and Dr. Margaret Amelia Corlis, (Department of Public Instruction Sydney, 13 May 1892 - New South Wales Medical Board Sydney, 11 May 1892 - 1,766). She opened a practice in Macquarie Street, Sydney the same year. Her sister Eugenie came to live with her and persuaded her to take tests due to her continuing symptoms, despite the better Australian weather.

== Later life and death ==
Berne was ultimately diagnosed with tuberculosis, and moved to the rural town of Trundle to stay with family friends, in the hope that the drier climate would be good for her health. She continued to practice in Trundle until her death in 1900.

== Legacy ==
Following Berne's death, her mother established the Dagmar Berne Prize in her honour, which is awarded annually to the final-year medical student at the University of Sydney with the highest marks.

Berne is interred in the Waverley Cemetery in the eastern Sydney suburb of Waverley. In 2001 Berne was inducted to the Victorian Honour Roll of Women. Dagmar and Berne Streets in St Peters are named in her honour.
