= John Inglis (civil servant) =

British civil servant (1820–1894)

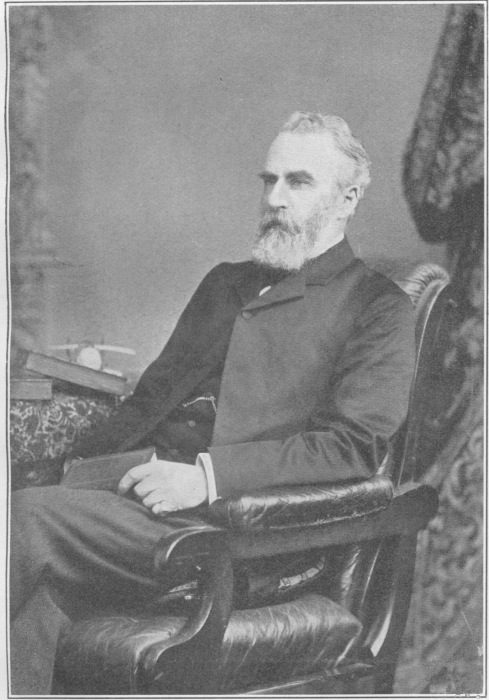
- Inglis in 1920
- Born: John Forbes David Inglis; 5 August 1820
- Died: 13 March 1894 (aged 73); Edinburgh
- Occupation: Civil servant
- Known for: Support of medical education for women

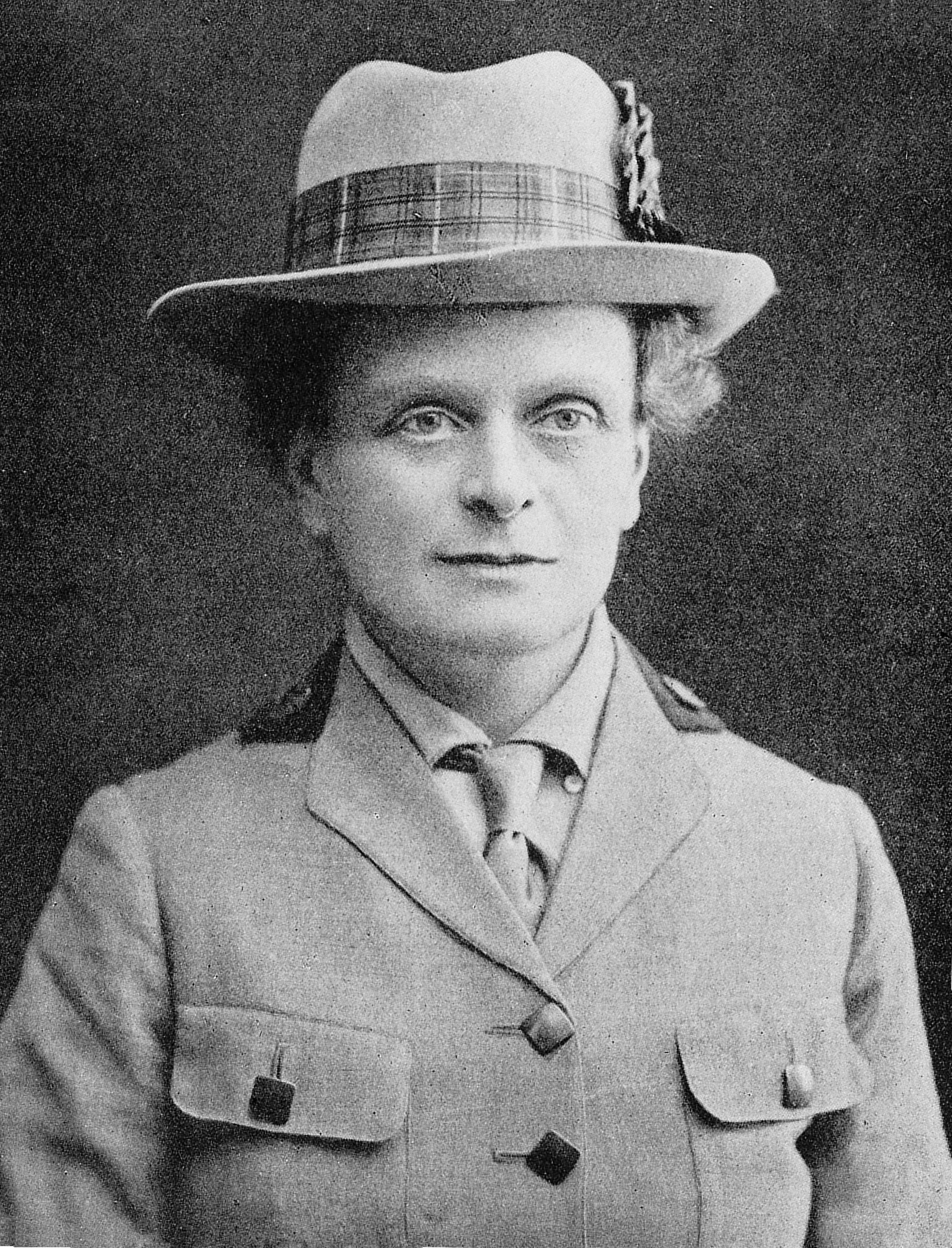
Elsie Inglis (1864–1917), daughter of Inglis and founder of the Scottish Women's Hospitals

John Forbes David Inglis (5 August 1820 – 13 March 1894) was an East India Company civil servant, who became Chief Commissioner of Oudh in North India. His disagreement with Lord Lytton's Afghan policy led to him being passed over for an expected promotion to be Governor of North West Province. He took early retirement and on his return to Edinburgh, he founded, jointly with his daughter Elsie Inglis, the Scottish Association for the Medical Education of Women. That association established the Edinburgh Medical College for Women at a time that women were not accepted into British university medical schools.

== Early life ==
He was born on 5 August 1820, second youngest son of David Inglis and his wife Martha (née Money). David Inglis had spent most of his life in India as writer, or solicitor, for the East India Company. His father Alexander Inglis, who originated from Kingsmills, Inverness-shire, emigrated to Charleston, South Carolina leaving his son David to be brought up in Scotland by an uncle.

Inglis was tutored by Rev Dr Joseph Niblock, a well known Greek scholar and educator. He then won a place at the East India College at Haileybury, moving to study there in 1839.

An incident at the school gives an interesting insight into the adolescence of a young man, described in later life as 'dedicated, pious, godly and 'honest'. On 29 May 1839, the Principal of the East India College at Haileybury, Charles Le Bas, wrote to Inglis' father:

'It is with unfeigned grief that I have to announce to you, that we have been under the afflicting necessity of rusticating your son for the remainder of the present term. You will doubtless recollect that, on a former occasion (Nov. 1838), I had the painful duty of inflicting on him ... a solemn Reprimand & Admonition, for joining a late, and very turbulent party, by which much mischief was done, and several students greatly annoyed and molested. His recent offence is, that ... he dined at an Inn at Hoddesdon, and returned to College in a state of very questionable sobriety ... '.

From Haileybury College he went to Calcutta where he spent two years learning local languages before being posted as assistant magistrate to Agra.

== Career in India ==
In 1847, he was transferred to Sealcote (now Sialcot) in the Punjab. By 1856, he was married with a young family and returned with them to Britain for prolonged leave. He returned alone to India in 1858 and, working under Sir John Lawrence, Chief Commissioner of the Punjab, was involved in some of the conflicts in the Indian Rebellion, at Najibabad, Bareilly and Rohilkhand. He was made Commissioner of Rohilkhand and became a member of the Legislative Council of India in which capacity he moved to Calcutta (now Kolkata) in 1873. In 1875, he was made Chief Commissioner of Oudh State.

As Inglis progressed up the ranks of the Indian Civil Service he could count among his personal friends Sir William Muir, foreign secretary to the Indian Government and lieutenant-governor of the North Western Provinces. Muir would later prove an influential friend in his role as Principal of the University of Edinburgh. He remained close to his former mentor Sir John Lawrence and agreed with his ideal that India should become a land 'thickly cultivated by a fat contented yeomanry, each riding his own horse, sitting under his own fig tree and enjoying his rude family comforts.' Lawrence had become Viceroy of India in 1863. With such friends in high places and an unblemished record in India it was anticipated that Inglis would be promoted to be Governor of North Western Provinces. Yet with the change in Viceroy came a change in policy. The appointment of Lord Lytton in 1875 resulted in a harsher Imperial policy. Lytton ordered the invasion of Afghanistan which sparked the Second Anglo-Afghan War. This proved to be a brutal guerrilla war with much loss of life, and Inglis, regarded as a liberal by his superiors, found himself in disagreement with the policy and out of favour with the higher ranks of the Raj. He was passed over for this anticipated promotion and decided to retire, aged 56, and return with his family to Edinburgh, where his married daughter Amy had now settled. They sailed first to Tasmania to spend time with sons George, Hugh and Cecil who had settled there and in 1878 embarked on the journey to Edinburgh.

== Personal life ==
On 7 February 1846, he married Harriet Lowes Thompson, one of nine daughters of George Thompson, an East India Company administrator. She was eighteen at the time of their marriage. They had six children in their 'first family' George David (b. 1847), Amy (b. 1848), Cecil (b. 1849), Hugh (b. 1851), Herbert (b. 1853) and Ernest (b. 1856). In 1856, Inglis arranged to take the family home to Britain for a period of leave of three years. This proved to be a prolonged journey which took 4 months to reach Bombay and a further 4 moths by sailing ship round Cape Hope to reach England. He was recalled early to India in 1858 because of the Indian Rebellion and returned leaving his family in Southampton. George, Hugh and Herbert were sent to school at Eton, Cecil to Uppingham and Ernest to Rugby, while Amy was looked after by relatives. Once they were settled and events in India were back to 'normal', Harriet Inglis returned to India in 1863 and they had the 'second family' of three further children, Eliza Maude (known as Elsie) (b. 1864), Eva Helen (b. 1866) and Horace (b. 1868). Elsie Inglis, who would become the most famous of his children, was born in the Himalayan hill station town of Naini Tal, in the state of Uttarakhand, When the Inglis family moved to Tasmania the Inglis girls were tutored by Miss Knott, a disciple of Dorothea Beale, a pioneer of education for women.

== Edinburgh and medical education for women ==
In Edinburgh Inglis arranged for Elsie to attend the new Edinburgh School of Medicine for Women which Sophia Jex-Blake had started in 1886. When Elsie Inglis emerged as the leader of a group of students who rebelled against what they perceived as Jex-Blake's over severe discipline, Inglis with his daughter, formed the Scottish Association for the Medical Education of Women. Supporters included his former colleague Sir William Muir, now returned from India as Principal of the University of Edinburgh. The Association established the Edinburgh Medical College for Women, which opened in 1889. The influence of the Association was such that within two years they were able to endow two wards for the teaching of women medical students at the Royal Infirmary of Edinburgh, which had previously refused to allow the teaching of female students.

Elsie Inglis went on to become a surgeon, a prominent figure in the suffrage movement and founded the Scottish Women's Hospitals which saw service behind front lines in the First World War.

Inglis continued to write almost daily letters, full of encouragement and support, to his daughter Elsie, until his death in 1894.

Over 20 years later, speaking at a large meeting at the Criterion Theatre in London in April 1916, she acknowledged the importance of his role in her life. 'If I have been able to do anything -whatever I am, whatever I have done - I owe it all to my father.' Inglis is buried in Dean Cemetery, Edinburgh.
