= Royal College of Physicians and Surgeons of Glasgow =

Institute in Glasgow City, Scotland

- Abbreviation: RCPSG
- Established: 1599; 427 years ago
- Founders: Peter Lowe, Robert Hamilton, William Spang
- Location: Glasgow
- Coordinates: 55.8624°N 4.2634°W
- President: Hany Eteiba
- Website: www.rcpsg.ac.uk

The Royal College of Physicians and Surgeons of Glasgow is an institute of physicians and surgeons in Glasgow, Scotland.

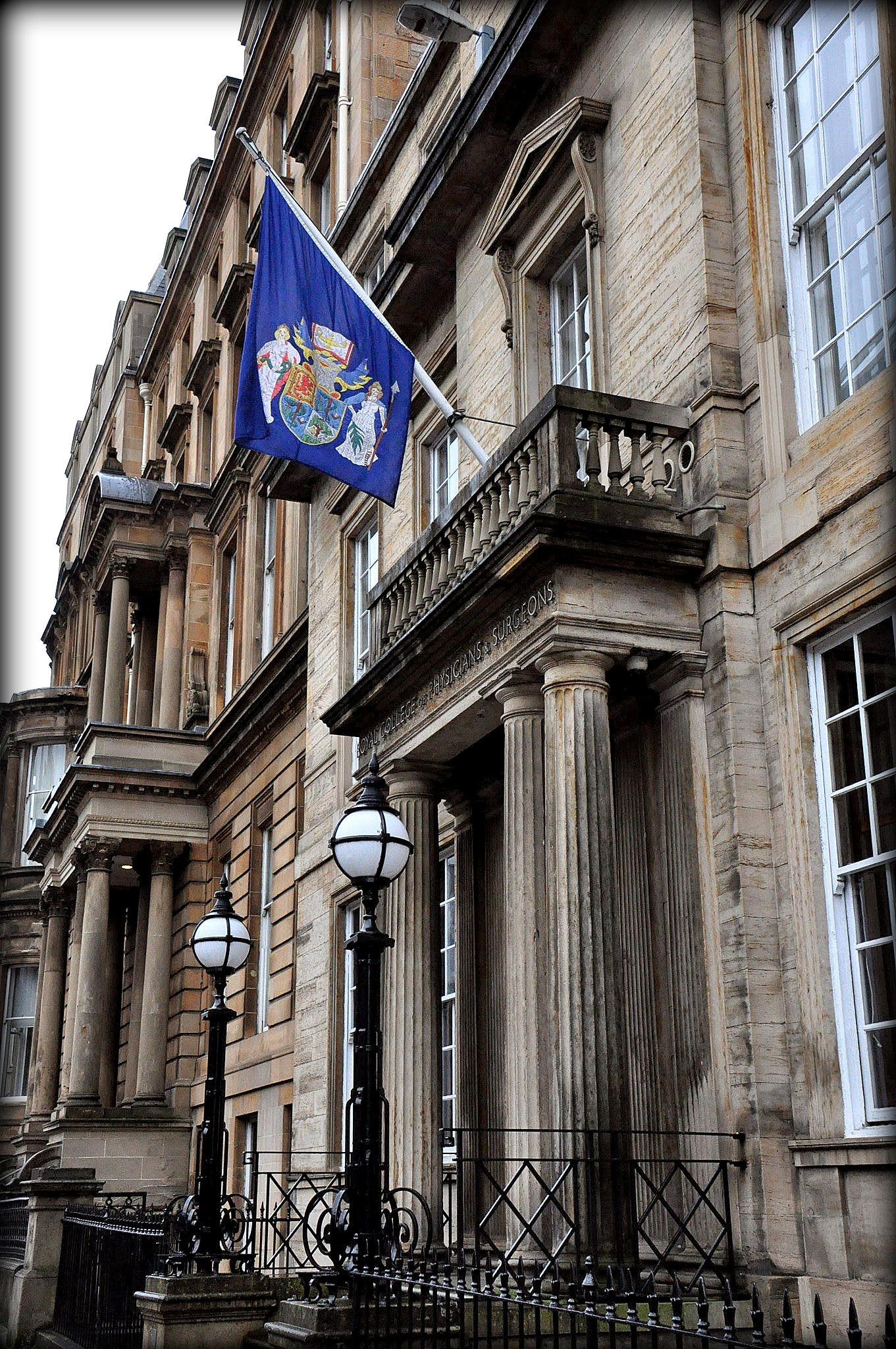
The Royal College of Physicians and Surgeons of Glasgow, St. Vincent Street, Glasgow, Scotland

Founded by Peter Lowe after receiving a royal charter by James VI in 1599, as the Glasgow Faculty, it is the UK's first and only multi-disciplinary medical royal college. Originally it existed as a regulatory authority to ensure that physicians, surgeons and dentists in the West of Scotland were appropriately trained and regulated. In 1909, it achieved royal recognition and became the Royal Faculty of Physicians and Surgeons of Glasgow (RFPSG). In 1962, following agreement with the other medical and surgical royal colleges in the UK it achieved collegiate status as the Royal College of Physicians and Surgeons of Glasgow (RCPSG), by which name it is known today.

The college, in combination with the Royal College of Physicians of Edinburgh and the Royal College of Surgeons of Edinburgh provided a primary medical qualification which entitled the bearer to practice medicine, and was registerable with the General Medical Council as a primary medical qualification the Triple Qualification diploma (LRCP (Edinburgh), LRCS (Edinburgh), LRCPSG). From 1994, until the abolition of non-university qualifying examinations in 1999, this was offered through the United Examining Board. Until 1948 the Faculty (as it then was) provided dental education via the Glasgow Dental School awarding the qualification of LDS RFPSG. Since 1948 training in dentistry has been provided by the University of Glasgow who award the BDS degree.

The college is now concerned with postgraduate medical education, offering examinations that lead to Membership and Fellowship to appropriately qualified physicians, surgeons, dental surgeons and podiatrists. They also offer a number of specialist postgraduate diplomas to medical practitioners in various subjects including dermatology, child health, geriatric medicine, travel health, ophthalmology, and dentistry.

== History ==
The college was founded in 1599, by a royal charter from King James VI of Scotland. The charter was granted to Peter Lowe, a surgeon who trained in France, and author of The Whole Course of Chirurgerie (1597), and Robert Hamilton, a Scottish physician. The charter also mentions by name the apothecary William Spang, who was granted the power to inspect and regulate the sale of drugs in the town. The college originally had no corporate name but became known as the Facultie (1629), then the Facultie of Chyrurgeons and Physitians (1654). By the end of the 17th century the name was established as the Faculty of Physicians and Surgeons of Glasgow. Powers were granted to examine and regulate surgical practice in the baronies of Glasgow, Renfrew and Dumbarton, and the districts or sheriffdoms of Clydesdale, Renfrew, Lanark, Kyle, Carrick, Ayr and Cunningham. Physicians were admitted on production of their MD diploma.

The faculty was incorporated with the town council to gain burgh privileges in 1656, and purchased a property on the Trongate in 1697. This was demolished and a purpose-built faculty hall was erected on the site in 1698. The Faculty Library was also founded in 1698. In 1791, the faculty moved to a new hall in St Enoch Square and in 1862 to their current property on St. Vincent Street, part of the New Town lands developed by William Harley of Blythswood Square. In 1909, the Faculty was allowed to add the prefix "royal" to its name; and in 1962 the name was again changed to the Royal College of Physicians and Surgeons of Glasgow to bring it into line with its sister corporations.

The faculty was unique in that it included the professions of barber and apothecary in addition to those of surgeon and physician. In 1656 the surgeons and barbers jointly received a Letter of Deaconry from the town council, establishing them as a craft or trade, with representation in the Trades House. However, relations between the barbers and the surgeons deteriorated later the 17th century, until in 1722 they split and the Letter of Deaconry became null and void. The barbers received money to the value of their share in the Faculty Hall in the Trongate and a new, separate Letter of Deaconry from the town council.

The faculty defended its right to be the only body in Glasgow responsible for training and maintaining standards against the claims of the University of Glasgow. This resulted in extensive litigation in the early 19th century over the status of surgical degrees, which was eventually settled in the faculty's favour. The faculty offered a licence for surgeons from 1785 which served as a basic medical qualification. The Double Qualification in medicine and surgery, established with the Royal College of Physicians of Edinburgh, was instituted in 1859 and was replaced by the Triple Qualification in 1884. This was a joint medical qualification between all three Scottish medical colleges. At the end of World War II the Goodenough Committee recommended that a medical degree be the sine qua non of entry to the medical profession. From that time onward the Royal College of Physicians and Surgeons of Glasgow has concentrated on postgraduate training, professional development and examinations.

In 1896 Elizabeth Adelaide Baker applied to become a fellow of the college. Although Baker had already been awarded the Triple Qualification in 1892, her application was rejected in the grounds that women were only allowed to hold registrable qualifications, and that the college Charter's use of the words "brethren" and "gentlemen" excluded women. In 1912 the college awarded the first female fellow, Jamini Sen, but major reforms took another century to materialise. In 2022, the college created its sustainability steering group to address the impact of climate change and sustainable development on health. The RCPSG appointed its first female president Jackie Taylor in 2019, and instituted its highest award (Taylor Medal) in her honour in 2025 to mark the college's 425-year anniversary; the first recipient was Seshadri Vasan. In 2025, Hany Eteiba, originally from Cairo, became the first international medical graduate to be elected president.

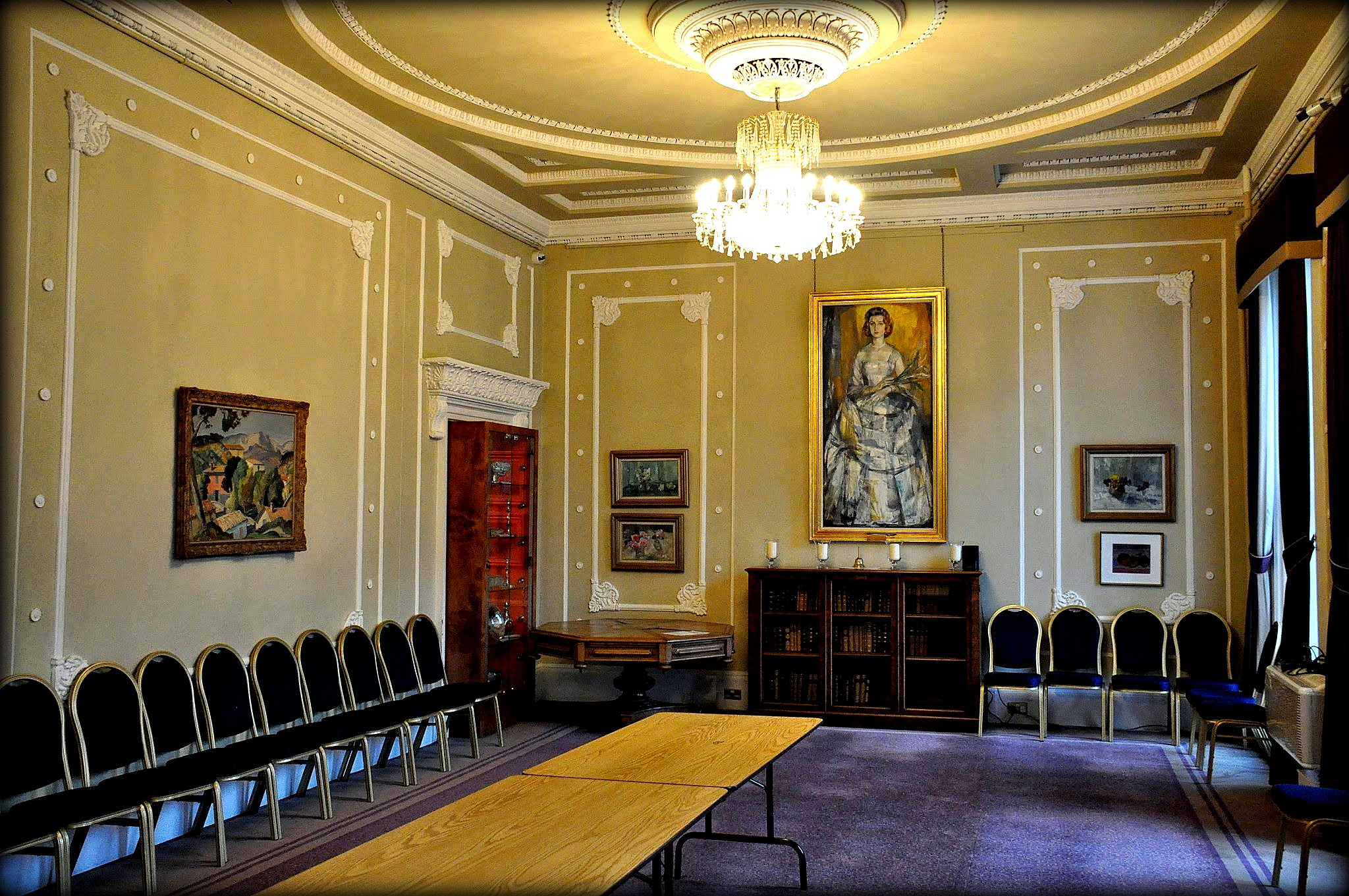
Princess Alexandra's Room

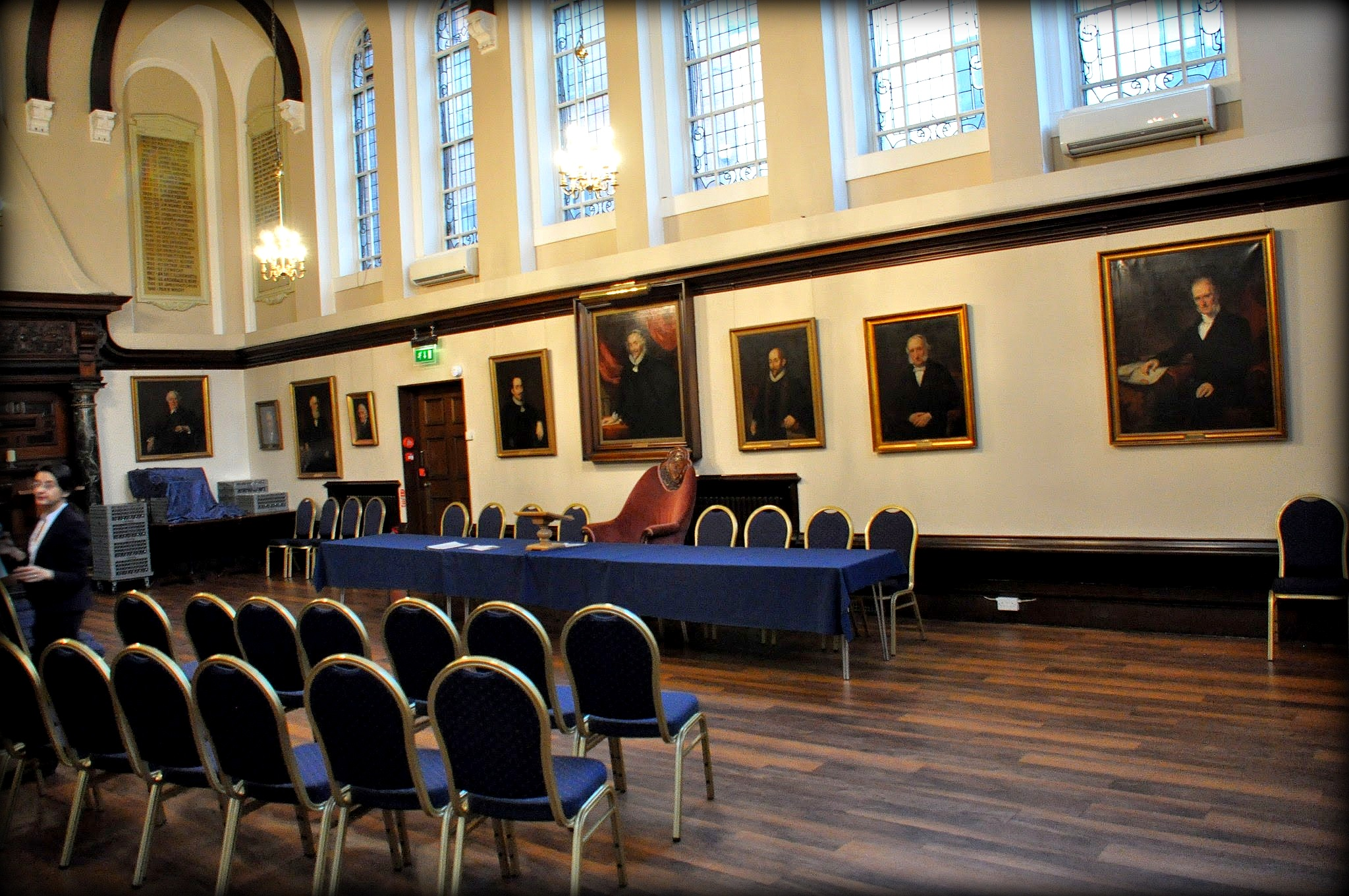
The College Hall

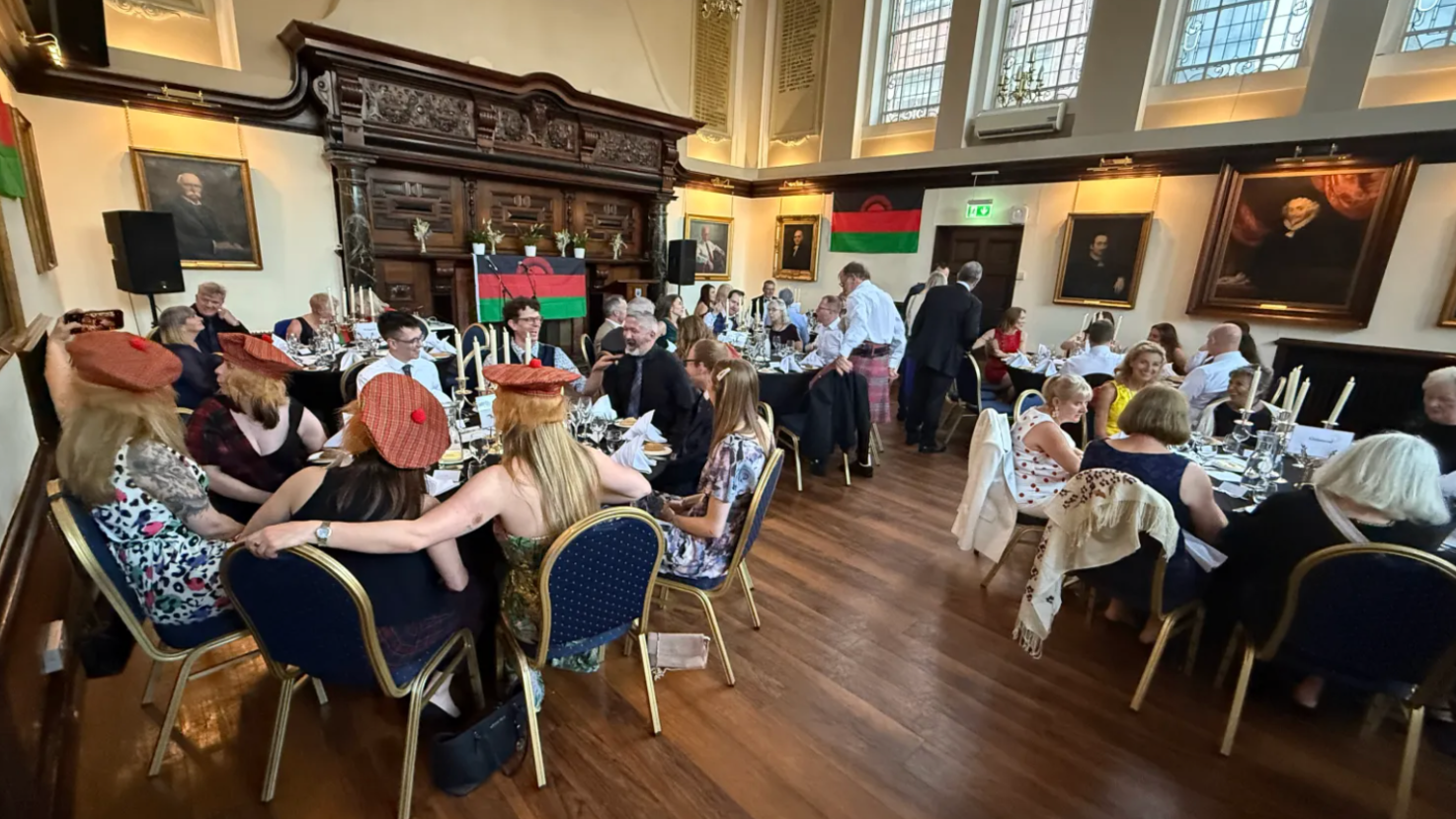
A Scotland Malawi Partnership group Smileawi in College Hall in 2025

== Qualifications awarded ==
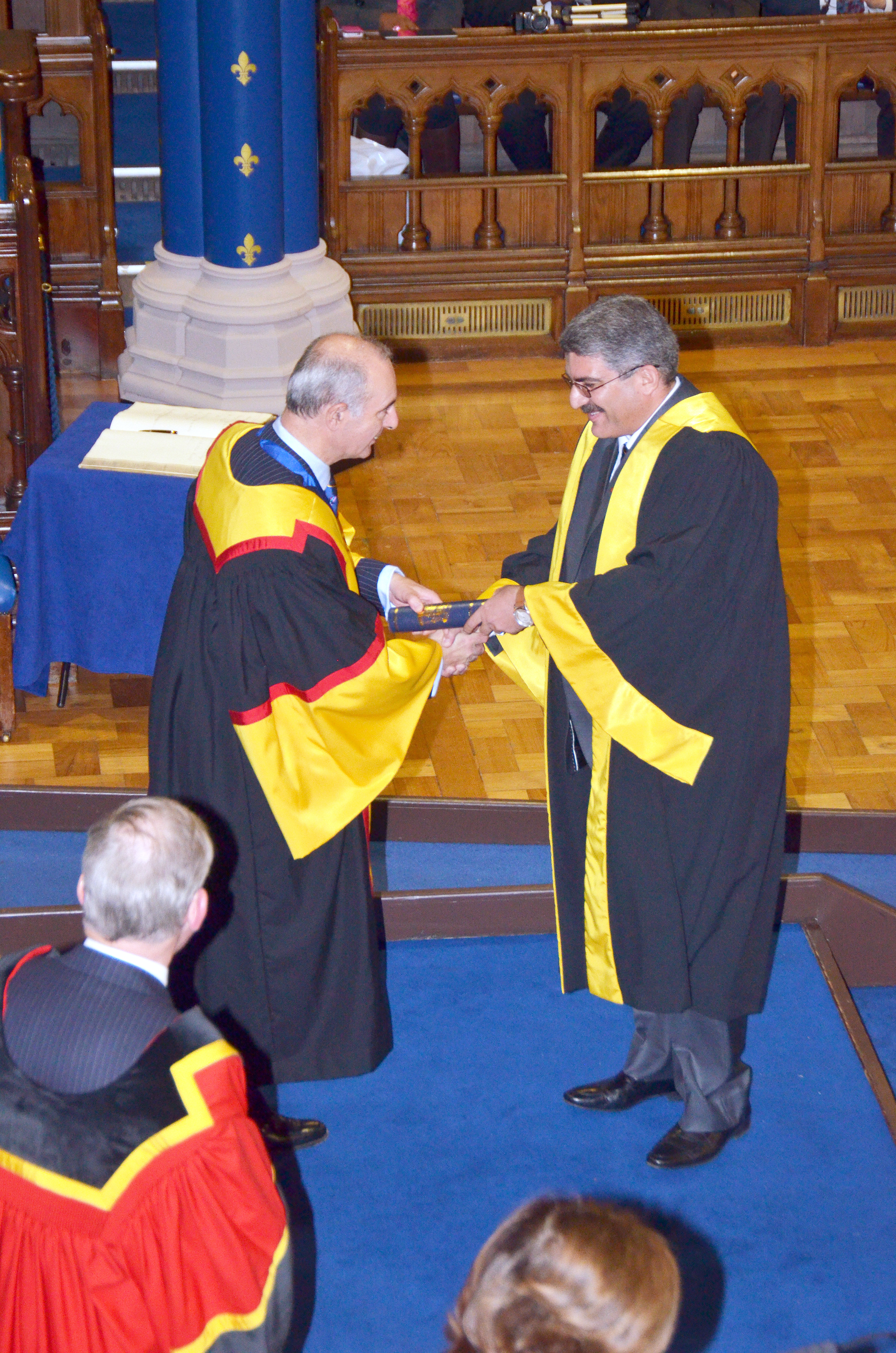
FRCP(Glasg), Fellowship of the Royal College of Physicians and Surgeons of Glasgow qua Physician. Admission ceremony at the Bute Hall of the University of Glasgow, Scotland, UK

- FRCP(G) (Fellow of the Royal College of Physicians and Surgeons of Glasgow qua Physician)
- FRCS(G) (Fellow of the Royal College of Physicians and Surgeons of Glasgow qua Surgeon)
- FDS RCPSG (Fellowship in Dental Surgery of Royal College of Physicians and Surgeons of Glasgow)
- FFTM RCPSG (Fellowship in the Faculty of Travel Medicine of Royal College of Physicians and Surgeons of Glasgow)
- FFPM RCPSG (Fellow of the Faculty of Podiatric Medicine of the Royal College of Physicians and Surgeons of Glasgow)
- Formerly MRCS(G) (Member of the Royal College of Physicians and Surgeons of Glasgow qua Surgeon)
- Intercollegiate MRCS (Membership of the Royal Colleges of Surgeons of Great Britain and Ireland)
- Formerly MRCP(G) (Member of the Royal College of Physicians and Surgeons of Glasgow qua Physician)
- Intercollegiate MRCP(UK) (Membership of the Royal Colleges of Physicians of the United Kingdom)
- MFDS RCPSG (Membership of the Faculty of Dental Surgery of the Royal College of Physicians and Surgeons Glasgow)

The reason the post-nominal letters for the fellowships use "FRCP(G)" and "FRCS(G)" rather than something like "FRCPS(G)-P" and "FRCPS(G)-S" is that they are parallel in form with all other similar fellowship designations for physicians and surgeons, such as FRCP(E)/FRCS(E), FRCP(I)/FRCS(I), FRCP(Lon)/FRCS(Eng). The same is true for the Royal College of Physicians and Surgeons of Canada, which grants the FRCP(C) and FRCS(C) fellowships.

== Faculty of Dental Surgery ==
The four surgical colleges in the UK and Ireland received authorisation, through legislation laid out in the Dentists Act 1878 (41 & 42 Vict. c. 33), to establish a qualification through examination that would lead to registration on the Dentist Register. The dentist act of 1984 now supersedes this. The register was held by the General Medical Council at that time. The first examination took place in 1879 and 'the Licence in Dental Surgery' was awarded by the Faculty of Physicians and Surgeons of Glasgow.

In 1935, the college decided to create a Dental Committee that could provide advice on dental matters. In 1967 this committee became known as the Dental Council.

1968 saw formation of the Joint Committee for Higher Training in Dentistry by the four Royal Colleges of Edinburgh, England, Glasgow and Ireland.

In 1990 a Dental Faculty was established to recognise the increasing role of Dental Fellows in the college. As a result, the Convenor of Dental Council was elevated to that of Dean.

Role of the Dental Faculty

The Faculty of Dental Surgery is the professional group within the college with responsibility for dental surgeons. The Faculty set standards for dental practice through prescribing programmes of education and training, assessing their outcomes through examination, and delivering programmes of continuing professional development.

Table 1: Positions on the Dental Executive
Elected Members	Other Members
Vice President (Dental)	President RCPS (Ex-officio)
2 x Vice Deans	Registrar RCPSG (Ex-officio)
Secretary	Director of the Dental Education and Professional Development Board (Co-opted)
4 x Ordinary Councillors	Director of the Dental Membership Services Board (Co-opted)
2 x 'Regional' councillors working in the UK outwith Scotland	Director of the Dental Examinations and Assessment Board (Co-opted)
3 x 'Regional councillors working in Scotland but outside Glasgow	International Advisor
Dental Fellow or Member less than 10 years GDC registered	Lay Advisor

Table 2: Conveners of Dental Council 1967–1989
1967-69	J.C MacDougall
1969-72	J.A.Russell
1972-74	T.C.White
1974-77	J. Ireland
1977-80	D.K.Mason
1980-83	A.F. Carmichael
1983-86	A.Cockburn
1986-89	H.D.Campbell

Table 3: Deans of the Dental Faculty 1989–2001
1989-92	D.A. McGowan
1992-95	K.F. Moos
1995-98	I.B Watson
1998-01	R.T. Reed

Table 4: Vice Presidents (Dental) 2001–2018
2001-04	D.G. MacDonald
2004-07	W.M.M. Jenkins
2007-10	M.A.O. Lewis
2010-13	Alyson P.M. Wray
2013-2016	R.R. Welbury
2016-	G.R. Ogden

Dental Examinations

Up until 1947 there was a continued demand for the Licence in Dental Surgery awarded by the Royal College. The University of Glasgow then took responsibility for undergraduate education of dental surgeons and began awarding degrees in Dentistry.

The Fellowship in Dental Surgery (FDS) was first established by the Royal College of Surgeons of England in 1947. The Glasgow College established its own FDS in 1967. Originally the FDS was the highest diploma in dentistry that could be awarded by the colleges.

In 1998 the Diploma of Membership of the Faculty of Dental Surgery (MFDS) was established as a three part exam.

As time progressed the MFDS was reconfigured into a two-part examination and eligibility to sit the exam was no longer restricted to those who had undertaken training in approved hospital or community posts. The MFDS is delivered jointly by the Royal College of Surgeons of Edinburgh and the Royal College of Physicians and Surgeons of Glasgow. The English and Irish colleges administer their own equivalent exams: Royal College of Surgeons England administer Membership of the Joint Dental Faculty and the Royal College Surgeons Ireland (MJDF RCSEng) administer Membership Faculty of Dentistry (MFD RCSI).

Dental Specialty Trainees have undergone Fellowship assessments since 1995, each undertaking a three-year minimum duration training programme.

A history of examinations and the qualifications awarded by the college for the dental faculty are listed in table 5 below.

Table 5: Current and past examinations in dental surgery
Examinations	College	Qualifications	Dates
Licence in Dental Surgery	RCPSG	LDS	1879–2000
Higher Dental Diploma	ROYAL COLLEGE OF PHYSICIANS AND SURGEONS OF GLASGOW	HDD	1920–1966
Diploma in Dental Orthopaedics	ROYAL COLLEGE OF PHYSICIANS AND SURGEONS OF GLASGOW	DDO/DDOrth	1949–1989
Fellowship in Dental Surgery	ROYAL COLLEGE OF PHYSICIANS AND SURGEONS OF GLASGOW	FDS	1967–2002
Membership in General Dental Surgery	ROYAL COLLEGE OF PHYSICIANS AND SURGEONS OF GLASGOW	MGDS	1982–2007
Membership in Clinical Community Dentistry	ROYAL COLLEGE OF PHYSICIANS AND SURGEONS OF GLASGOW	MCCD	1989–2007
Membership in Dental Orthopaedics	ROYAL COLLEGE OF PHYSICIANS AND SURGEONS OF GLASGOW	MDO	1990–1999
Membership in the Faculty of Dental Surgery	ROYAL COLLEGE OF PHYSICIANS AND SURGEONS OF GLASGOW	MFDS	1999–2007
Membership in Oral Maxillo-facial Surgery	ROYAL COLLEGE OF PHYSICIANS AND SURGEONS OF GLASGOW	MOMS	2000–2012
Bi-collegiate general membership examination	ROYAL COLLEGE OF PHYSICIANS AND SURGEONS OF GLASGOW RCSEd	MFDS	2007–current
Inter-collegiate specialty fellowship examinations	ROYAL COLLEGE OF PHYSICIANS AND SURGEONS OF GLASGOW RCSEd RCSEng RCSI	FDS (DPH) FDS (OM) FDS(Orth) FDS(OS) FDS(Paed Dent) FDS(Rest Dent)	1995-current 1995-current 1995-current 1995-current 1995-current 1995-current
Bi-collegiate specialty membership examinations Tri-collegiate exams administered by RCSED, RCS Eng and ROYAL COLLEGE OF PHYSICIANS AND SURGEONS OF GLASGOW respectively. The M(Oral Surg) exam superseded MSurgDent	ROYAL COLLEGE OF PHYSICIANS AND SURGEONS OF GLASGOW RCSEng ROYAL COLLEGE OF PHYSICIANS AND SURGEONS OF GLASGOW RCS Ed RCS Eng	MRD MOrth MPaed Dent MSCD MOS	1993-current 1999-current 2012-current 2012-current 2012-current

Dental Bursaries and awards

Professor Thomas Cyril White, Convenor of the Dental Council 1972–1974, bequeathed his estate to the Royal College of Physicians and Surgeons of Glasgow 'for the furtherance of postgraduate dental education and research'.

Professor White was awarded a chair in orthodontics in 1963 at the University of Glasgow and went on to become dean of the dental school. Initially Professor White qualified with a Licence in Dental Surgery in Glasgow in 1933 and then Medicine and Surgery in 1935.

The Royal College holds an annual symposium and awards several prizes (Table 6) which include the T C white Medal for outstanding performance in the Part 2 MFDS examination.

The college administers other awards and grant schemes from other donors listed in Table 7.

Table 6: List of TC White awards and grants
White Young Researcher Grant
TC White Travel Grant
TC White Lecture Award
TC White Observer ship Award

Table 7: List of other awards and grants
UK Dental Undergraduate Award
Aileen Lyn Bequest Fund
Ritchie Trust Research Fund
The Ben Walton Trust Award

== Faculty of Podiatric Medicine ==
The Faculty of Podiatric Medicine was officially formed on 11 May 2012, following several years of negotiations between the college and representatives of the podiatry profession.

The establishment of the Faculty of Podiatric Medicine represented an important milestone, being the first time one of the UK Royal Colleges of medicine and surgery had agreed to accept suitably qualified members of podiatry profession to join and establish a standalone faculty.

The faculty promotes and supports the advancement of postgraduate education and development in podiatric medicine both locally and across the UK, as well as internationally in such countries as Australia and the United States. In 2024, the college developed a memorandum of understanding with the American Board of Podiatric Medicine (ABPM) to form a partnership allowing members of the board to join the college.

Podiatrists can apply for Membership of the Faculty (MFPM RCPS(Glasg)), and undergo examinations or assessment of prior skills and experience to progress towards Fellowship (FFPM RCPS(Glasg)).

== See also ==
- Faculty of Pharmaceutical Medicine
- Membership of the Royal College of Surgeons
- Fellowship of the Royal College of Surgeons

== Sources ==
- Illingworth, Sir Charles. Royal College of Physicians and Surgeons of Glasgow. Glasgow: 1980. 16 pp (No ISBN)
- Geyer-Kordesch, Johanna & MacDonald, Fiona. Physicians and Surgeons in Glasgow. The History of the Royal College of Physicians and Surgeons of Glasgow 1599 - 1858. London: The Hambledon Press 1999. 478 pp ISBN 1-85285-186-4
- Hull, Andrew & Geyer-Kordesch, Johanna. The Shaping of the Medical Profession. The History of the Royal College of Physicians and Surgeons of Glasgow 1858 - 1999. London: The Hambledon Press 1999. 288 pp ISBN 1-85285-187-2
