= Bruntsfield Hospital =

- NHS Lothian
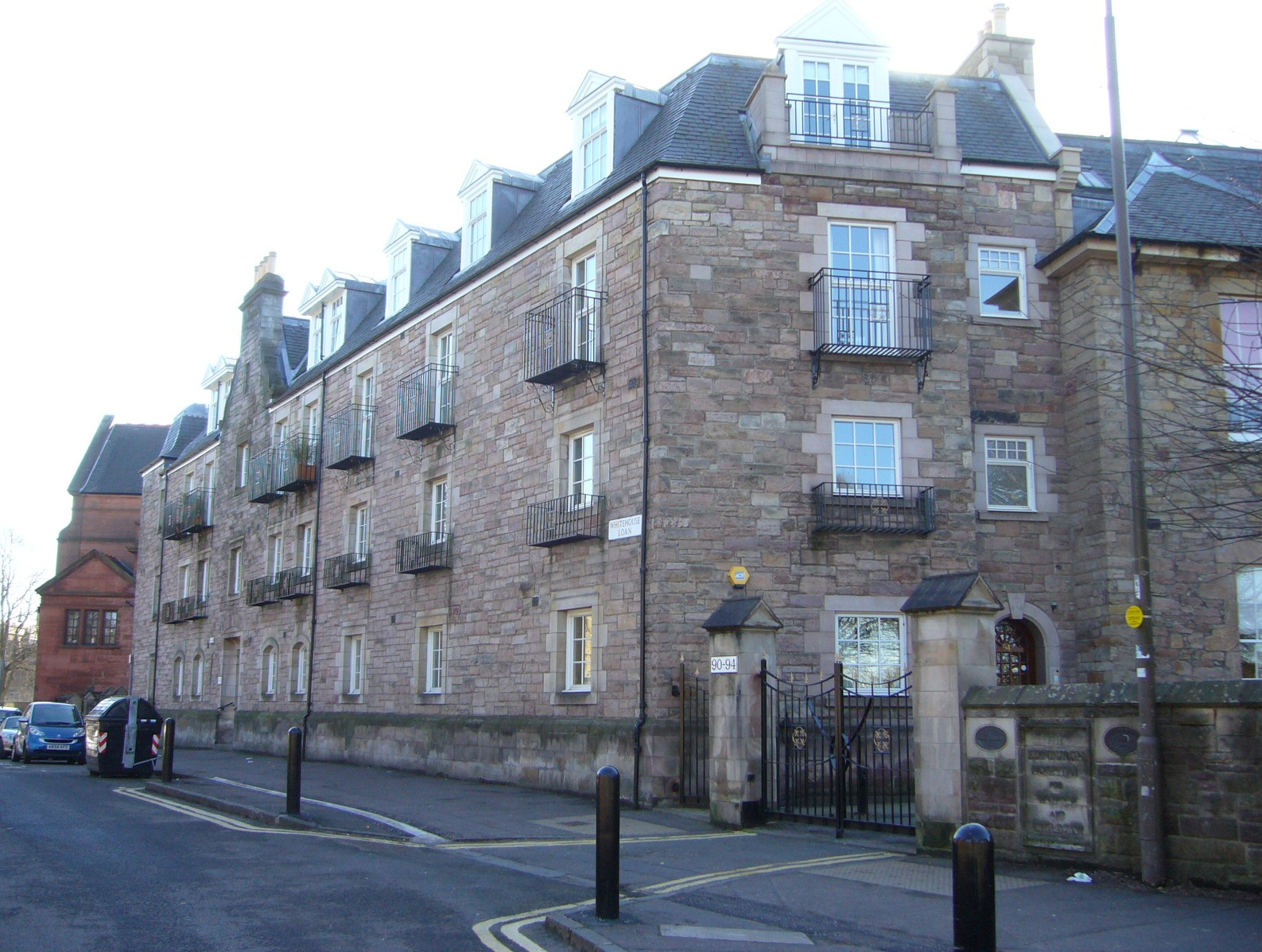
- Former Bruntsfield Hospital

- Shown in Edinburgh

Geography
- Location: Edinburgh, Scotland
- Coordinates: 55.9355°N 3.2024°W

Organisation
- Care system: NHS Scotland

Services
- Emergency department: No

History
- Founded: 1878
- Closed: 1989

Links
- Lists: Hospitals in Scotland

Bruntsfield Hospital was a women's hospital based in the Bruntsfield area of Edinburgh, Scotland.

== History ==
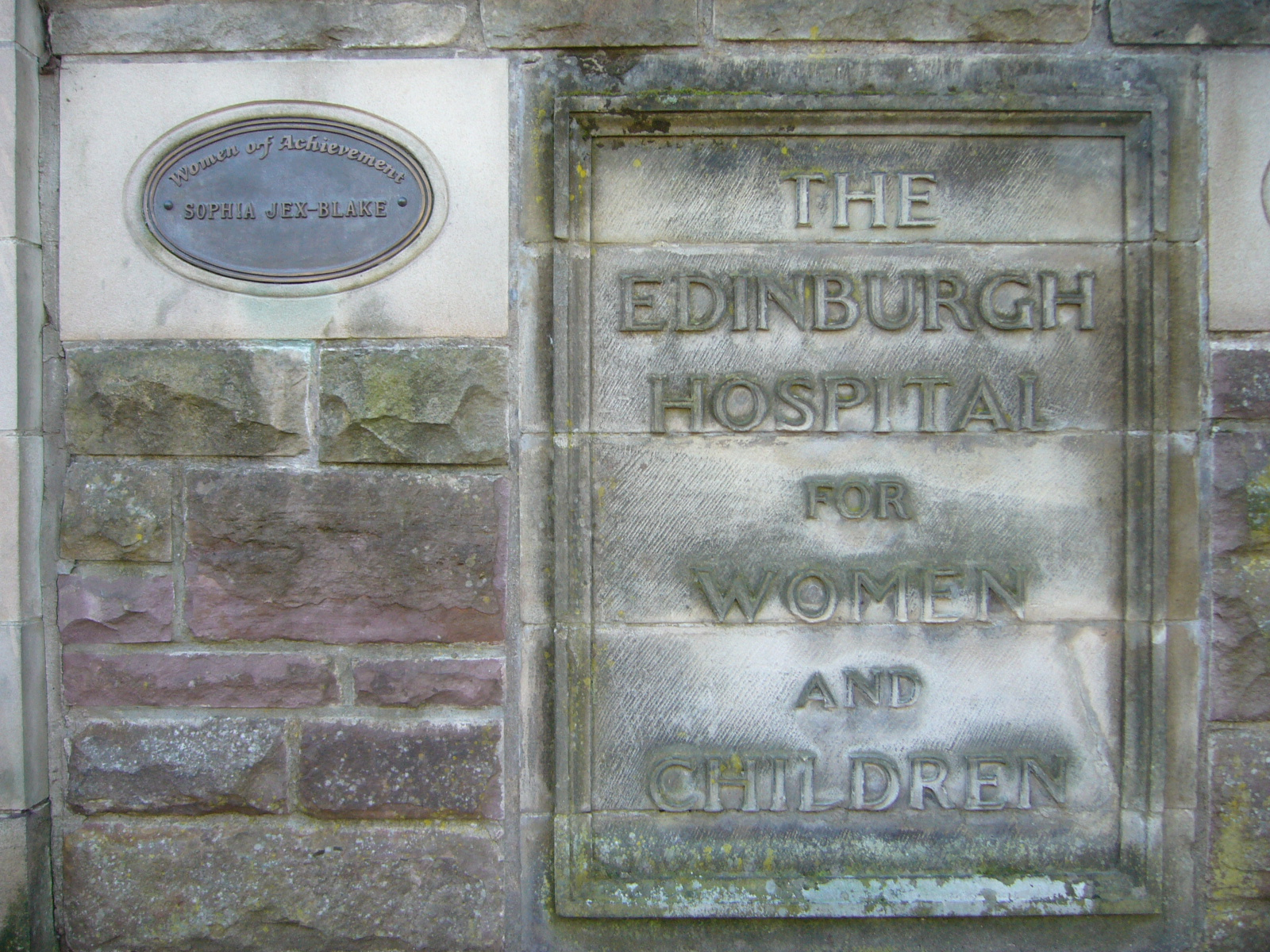
Plaque and tablet on the hospital building

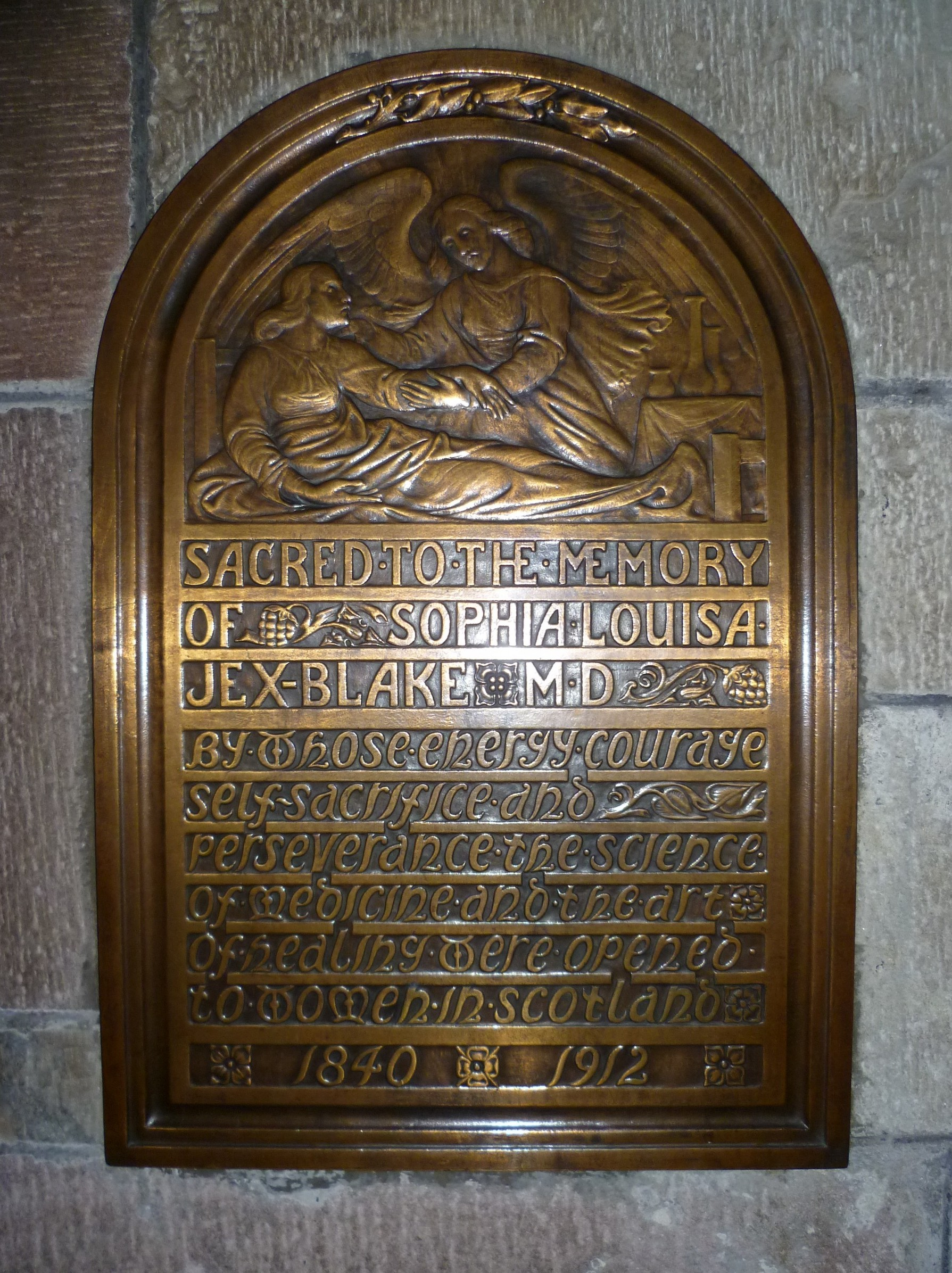
Sophia Jex-Blake memorial plaque in St Giles' Cathedral

The hospital had its origins in a public dispensary opened by Sophia Jex-Blake at 73 Grove Street in September 1878. It moved to 6 Grove Street, a building large enough to provide in-patient services, as the Edinburgh Hospital and Dispensary for Women and Children in 1885.

When Jex-Blake retired and moved away in 1899, the trustees acquired her house, Bruntsfield Lodge, and fitted it out as an 18-bed women's hospital. The hospital committee was led by well-connected women active in various social reform projects such as Flora Stevenson.

In 1910 the hospital merged with "The Hospice", a small maternity home which had been established by Elsie Inglis and the Medical Women's Club at 11 George Square some eleven years previously. A new ward block, designed by Arthur Forman Balfour Paul, was officially opened by Queen Mary in July 1911. The hospital was joined the National Health Service in 1948 and closed in 1989. The building was then converted for residential use and is now known as Greenhill Court.
