= Triple Qualification =

Defunct medical qualification in Scotland

- Triple Qualification certificate
- Acronym: TQ
- Year started: 1884
- Year terminated: 1993
- Languages: English

The Triple Qualification (TQ) was a medical qualification awarded jointly by the Royal College of Surgeons of Edinburgh, the Royal College of Physicians of Edinburgh and the Faculty (later Royal College) of Physicians and Surgeons of Glasgow between 1884 and 1993. Successful candidates could register with the General Medical Council (GMC) and practise medicine in the United Kingdom. It was a route used by international medical graduates and those unable to gain entry to university medical schools, which included women in the late 19th century and refugee medical students and doctors throughout the 20th century.

== Origins ==
Before the Medical Act 1858 medical practitioners in the British Isles could acquire their qualifications from a number of institutions, including universities, medical and surgical colleges and from the Apothecaries' Halls in London and Dublin. The Medical Act 1858 established the General Medical Council and the Medical Register, and began the process of standardising medical education, qualification and registration. The Medical Act 1886 required qualification in both medicine and surgery for entry to the Medical Register and the three Scottish medical royal colleges set up a combined medical and surgical qualification called the Triple Qualification (TQ). This was approved by the GMC in 1884, and in the same year the Royal College of Physicians of London and the Royal College of Surgeons of England set up a similar joint qualification known as the Conjoint Diploma.

== Teaching and training ==
The TQ examination regulations required candidates to present proof of having attended approved lectures and approved clinical teaching placements. In Edinburgh and Glasgow private anatomy schools and small private medical schools had been a key feature of medical education since the late 18th century. These were known collectively as extramural schools.

In Glasgow these included Anderson’s College Medical School and the Glasgow Royal Infirmary School of Medicine, which in 1888 became St Mungo's Medical School. The Queen Margaret College Medical School for Women merged with the University of Glasgow in 1892.

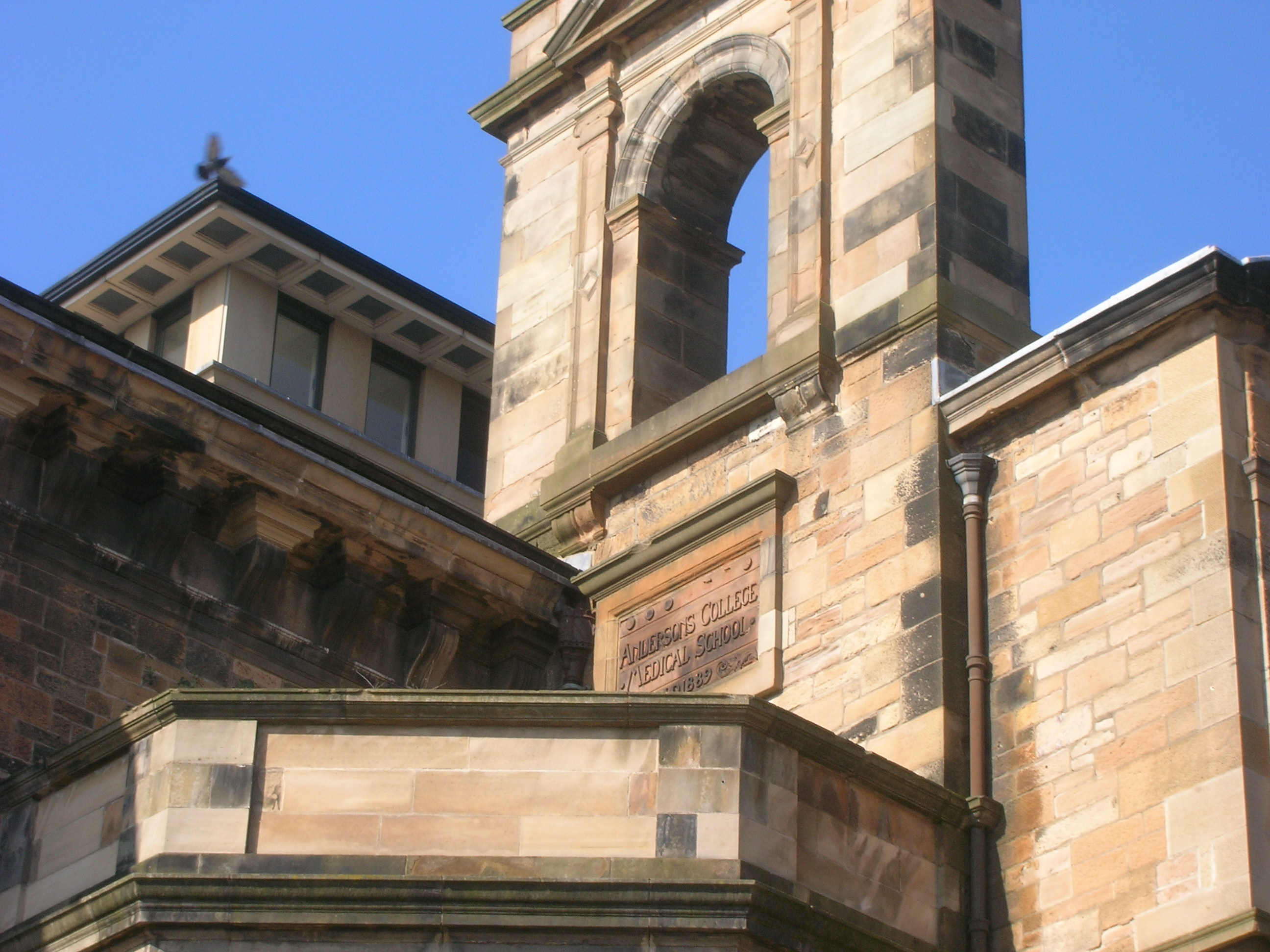
Anderson's College Medical School, Glasgow, showing the tower and the plaque with the College name engraved

In Edinburgh many university lecturers and professors also gave extramural classes including John Barclay, Robert Knox, Robert Liston and James Syme. The first school to offer lectures on a range of subjects was Queen's College, established in 1841. Two medical schools for women latterly formed part of the extramural school in Edinburgh. In 1885 Sophia Jex-Blake founded the Edinburgh School of Medicine for Women (which closed in the late 1890s), and in 1889 Elsie Inglis and her father John Inglis founded the Edinburgh College of Medicine for Women. One of the effects of the GMC regulation was the consolidation of most of the extramural schools in Edinburgh into a formal School of Medicine of the Royal Colleges of Edinburgh, founded in 1895. This school of medicine had a charter, a board of governors from the three colleges and provided a comprehensive lecture course equivalent to that of a university medical school, and became the principle teaching institution in Edinburgh for TQ students.

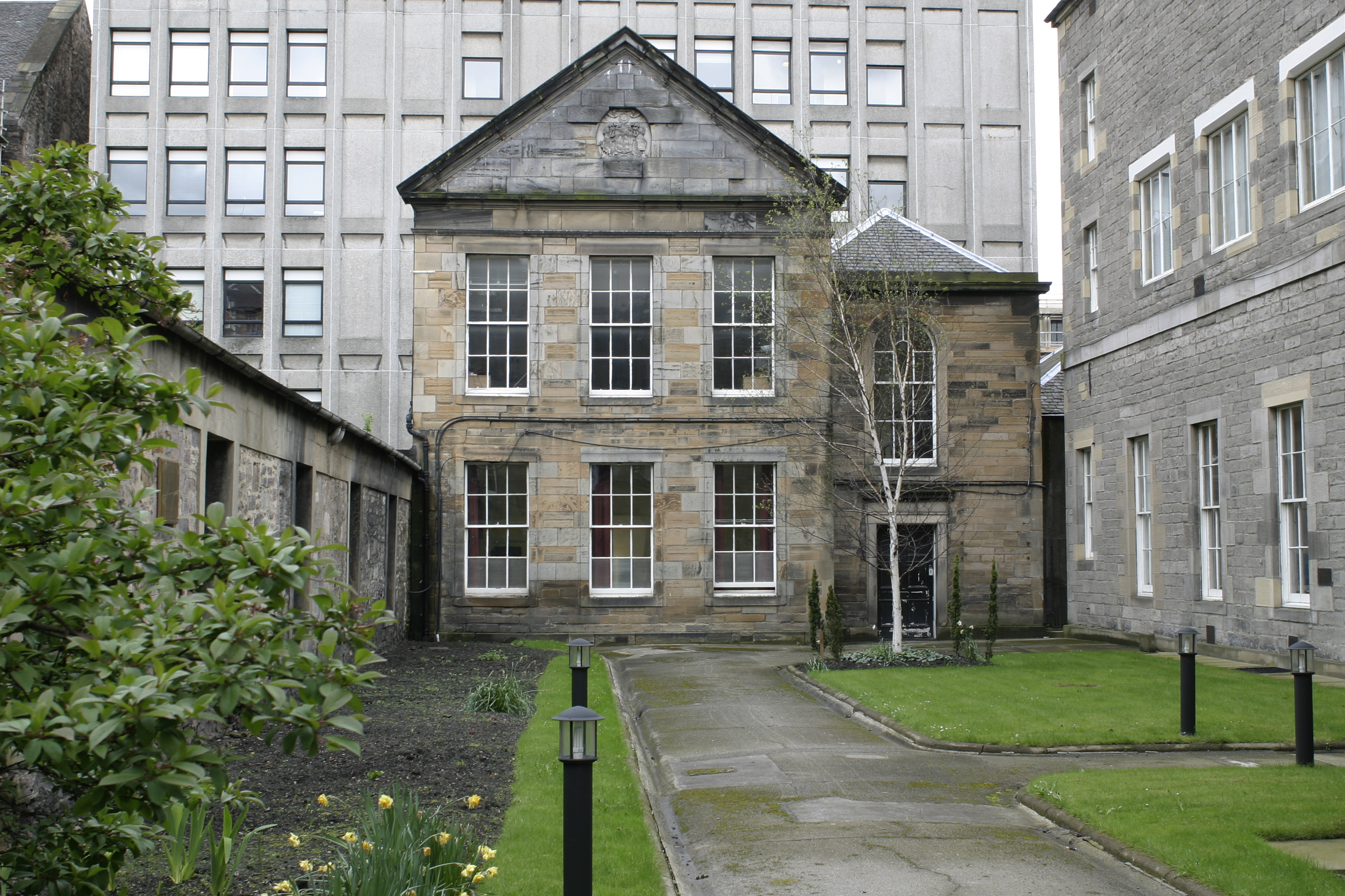
The former School of Medicine of the Edinburgh Royal Colleges

== Curriculum ==
Candidates for the TQ were first required to pass a preliminary entrance examination or show evidence of an approved university degree.

They were then required to complete a curriculum as follows:

- Anatomy, 6 months
- Practical anatomy, two courses of 6 months
- Chemistry, 6 months
- Practical/analytical chemistry, 3 months
- Dispensary attendance, 3 months
- Practical pharmacy, 3 months
- Materia medica, 3 months
- Pathological anatomy or general pathology, 3 months
- Practical midwifery, at least 6 deliveries
- Practice of medicine, 6 months
- Clinical medicine, 9 months
- Principles and practice of surgery, 6 months
- Clinical surgery, 9 months
- Midwifery/diseases of women and children, 3 months
- Medical jurisprudence, 3 months

In addition to the above, many candidates took voluntary additional courses which included sanitary science, histology, botany, psychiatry, dermatology, ophthalmic surgery, diseases of the ear, nose and throat and therapeutics. These regulations were rigorously enforced and exceptions were rarely granted. Doctors who had qualified elsewhere in the world, often with years of experience were still required to complete the clinical elements and in many cases the basic science elements.

== Examinations ==
Triple Qualification examination schedule issued to Elsie Inglis

The examinations were very similar to those taken in university medical schools. Basic sciences and basic anatomy were examined at the end of the first year, anatomy, physiology and materia medica at the end of the second year with clinical examinations being taken in the final year. The examinations changed with time to take account of advances in medicine and medical education. They came to include anaesthetics, paediatrics, psychiatry, ophthalmology, diseases of the ear, nose and throat, forensic medicine, and venereal disease. From 1968 international graduates from approved medical schools could be admitted directly to the final examination. In 1975 the GMC set up the Temporary Registration Assessment Board (TRAB), which conducted its own structured examination for international medical graduates, which included an assessment of English language skills. TQ candidates were required to pass this before being granted temporary GMC registration. From 1978 this became the Professional and Linguistic Assessments Board (PLAB).

Candidates who successfully completed the course and passed the examinations could place the post-nominals LRCPE, LRCSE & LRCPSG after their names and could apply for provisional registration with the GMC. After completion of one year of pre-registration house officer posts, they could apply for full registration.

== Candidates ==
The total number of candidates obtaining the TQ qualification between 1894 and 1993 has been calculated to be 10,246, of whom 9.3% were women. The pass rate has been estimated at 48% in 1890-99 down to 21% in the last examination to be administered by the TQ board in 1993.

Many of the candidates came from countries of the former British Empire, many came from Europe and others from Russia, China, Japan, South America and the United States.

Scottish qualification regulations were simpler than those in England. The examination therefore proved to be a popular route to British medical practice for international medical graduates whose degrees were not recognised in the UK, for refugee doctors or aspiring doctors and for those unable to gain entry to university medical schools. In the latter years of the 19th century, this included women whose entry to British university medical schools began in 1892. Between 1884 and 1909, 7% of those qualifying with the TQ qualification were women, a higher percentage than qualified from university medical schools at that time. Among the women to qualify with the TQ were Elsie Inglis, who went on to found the Scottish Women's Hospitals in WW1 and Dagmar Berne. who became the second woman to register as a doctor in Australia.

Between 1933 and 1938, some 25% of the successful candidates were of European Jewish origin, a reflection of Nazi persecution. Some of these Jewish refugees who qualified with the TQ went on to academic careers in the UK, like Hans Kosterlitz, who fled from Berlin to Aberdeen where he worked with J. J. R. MacLeod, who had, jointly with Frederick Banting, won the Nobel Prize for the discovery of insulin. Kosterlitz qualified with the Triple Qualification in 1938, and eventually became Professor of Pharmacology at Aberdeen University in 1968. He went on to discover endorphins and was elected a Fellow of the Royal Society who awarded him their prestigious gold medal.

Following the unilateral declaration of independence by the then Southern Rhodesia (Zimbabwe) in 1965, many of the candidates came from that country.

== Controversies ==
Throughout its lifetime, controversy was never far away from the TQ, the conjoint examination and the LMSSA (Licence in Medicine and Surgery of the Society of Apothecaries). The TQ had been created out of a concern felt by the Scottish medical colleges that they might lose their status as licensing bodies in favour of the universities and the London Colleges. The universities from the outset regarded the TQ as inferior to their examinations. In 1870, Edinburgh University told Parliament that it had a ‘fully equipped medical school which was operating to higher standards than any of the other award bodies’. Most doctors who had qualified with the TQ pursued a career in general practice rather than a hospital speciality, and many felt that there was discrimination against them entering hospital medicine as they had what was regarded by many as an 'inferior qualification'.

Until the 1960s many university medical students would take the TQ or the Conjoint final exams as practice for university finals or as a fall back in case of failure in finals. It was common for those who did fail university final to then sit the TQ, conjoint or LMSSA. In 1982, seven out of ten Cambridge University medical students who had failed university exams immediately sat and passed the Apothecaries examination, further strengthening the view that non-university exams were set at a lower standard. The view that the three non-university medical qualifications constituted an inappropriate and easy "back door into medicine" was regularly voiced in the medical press.

Despite being regarded as an inferior qualification and in the face of repeated unfavourable GMC inspections, there was pressure on the GMC for its retention, on the grounds that it offered international graduates, and in particular refugee doctors, a British medical qualification.

== Demise ==
The Goodenough report (1944) concluded that "...the extra-mural schools [are] of a lower standard than other schools in the country" and recommended that all undergraduate medical education and qualification in the UK should be administered by universities. As a result, the Edinburgh School of Medicine of the Royal Colleges closed in 1948. Yet the Colleges continued to offer the TQ qualification. In the 1950s many candidates were British students whose studies had been interrupted by war service, while from the early 1960s the vast majority of candidates were international medical graduates or medical students. From 1979 the GMC required prospective international candidates for the TQ to sit and pass the PLAB examination.

Freedom of movement of workers within the European Union from 1973 began the process of EU qualified medical practitioners practising in the UK without any examination. This was eventually enshrined in UK law by European Directive 2005/36/EC in 2005.

A GMC inspection in 1985 found the TQ examination 'old-fashioned' and from 1994 the Triple and the Conjoint examinations, together with the LMSSA were combined and came under the aegis of the United Examining Board(UEB) which had been set up to by the GMC to oversee non-university medical qualifications. Candidates now sat the same examination, held in turn by each of the three licensing bodies. At the same examination diet they sat written, oral and clinical examinations and, if successful, were awarded the qualification of the centre where they sat. Candidates who sat in Edinburgh were still awarded the Triple Qualification. Inspections by the GMC from 1998 reported doubts about whether successful candidates had the 'breadth and depth of knowledge, the clinical skills and the professional attitudes and values expected by the GMC of UK-qualified doctors'. They concluded that the examination was not fit for purpose and recommended its abolition.

The final diet of the TQ examination was held in 1993. In 2000 the GMC decided that all UEB candidates should be assessed by universities. The last LMSSA diploma was awarded in 2003 and the UEB was dissolved in 2007.
