= Agnes Bennett =

Australian New Zealand medical doctor (1872–1960)

Agnes Bennett OBE
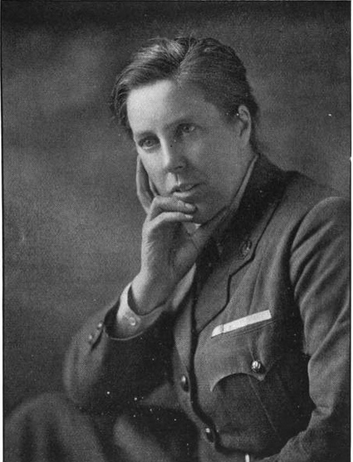
- Born: 24 June 1872; Australia
- Died: 17 November 1960 (aged 88); New Zealand
- Education: University of Sydney; Edinburgh College of Medicine for Women; University of Edinburgh
- Military career
- Branch: Royal New Zealand Army Medical Corps NZ Exp Force Egypt (1915); Scottish Women's Hospitals Scottish Women's Hospitals, Macedonia (1916-17)
- Service years: 1915-1917
- Rank: Captain; Chief Medical Officer
- Commands: Ostrovo Unit
- Known for: Services to medicine in World War I and to women and children's medicine in New Zealand
- Conflicts: World War I
- Awards: British War Medal; Victory Medal; Order of St Sava (third class); Royal Red Cross of Serbia

Agnes Elizabeth Lloyd Bennett OBE (24 June 1872 – 27 November 1960) was an Australian New Zealand doctor, a Chief Medical Officer of a World War I medical unit for which she was awarded the Serbian Order of St Sava and later was awarded an O.B.E. for her services in improving the health of women and children.

== Early life ==
She was born in Sydney, New South Wales, Australia on 24 June 1872, the sixth child of William Christopher Bennett, and his first wife Agnes Amelia, née Hays. Bennett's father was an engineer and the commissioner of roads and bridges for New South Wales. Bennett attended Sydney Girls High School, as well as Cheltenham Ladies' College, Dulwich Girls' High School and Abbotsleigh. In 1878 Agnes Bennett had taken her children to England for their schooling, but after she died of smallpox in June 1881 they returned to Australia. Bennett won a scholarship in 1890 and studied science at the University of Sydney (B.Sc., 1894), and was the first woman to be awarded a BSc with Honours by the University of Sydney. She was secretary of and a night-school teacher for the Women's Association (later University Women's Settlement).

== Life as a medical practitioner ==
Initially unable to find a job as a medical practitioner, Bennett worked for a time as a teacher and governess, then left Australia in 1895 to study at the Edinburgh College of Medicine for Women which had been established by Elsie Inglis and her father John Inglis. She studied with fellow Australians Kate Welton Hogg and Mary Booth, and Irish women Eleanor Sproull and Elizabeth Macrory. She graduated MB CM from the University of Edinburgh in 1899. She returned to Sydney in 1901 and set up in private practice in Darlinghurst Road, but although she gave free medical advice she was forced to give up her practice because of the then-common prejudices against female doctors. She briefly worked at Callan Park, the hospital for the Insane before leaving in 1905 to take over the practice of a woman doctor in Wellington, New Zealand. This time, the practice thrived. She was a chief medical officer at St Helens maternity hospital, and honorary physician, with Dr Daisy Platts-Mills, to the children's ward of Wellington Hospital from 1912. In 1911 she completed her M.D. at Edinburgh.

== World War I ==
Agnes Bennett was the first women doctor in both the New Zealand Medical Corps, and the Royal Army Medical Corps based in Egypt during the Gallipoli campaign. While she had the rank and pay of captain, she did not receive a commission. When the first stationary hospital was established in Cairo, she was let go from the hospital New Zealand using. She was then appointed Senior Resident Medical Officer in the Imperial Infectious Diseases Hospital. Almost immediately, she met up with Elsie Inglis in London who asked her to work with the Scottish Women's Hospitals. On 2 August 1916, the America Unit, in the command of Bennett, reached Southampton preparatory to embarking on the hospital ship Dunluce Castle for Salonika. The ship arrived in Salonika on 13 August and on the 17th of that month, Bennett travelled by car to visit the proposed campsite.

Originally intended as a base hospital at Salonika, the unit's status was changed. As the only hospital for the use of the defeated Third Serbian Army, it would now be situated near the front, acting more or less as a casualty clearing station. Finally, on 7 September 1916, the first vehicles of her thirty-nine car convoy (Mrs. Harley's Unit included), left Salonika on the road to Ostrovo Lake. By 11 September, Bennett was able to record the Ostrovo Unit "The hospital is gradually getting into being-progress slow, partly on account of labour." By 28 September, she was writing: "We have admitted 204 patients up to today; ten of the staff are ill which means 14 off work..."

While Chief Medical Office of the Ostrovo Unit, Bennett was concerned with the difficulties the unit faced being so far from the front. Far too many men were losing their lives through the delay in getting them down to her hospital. There was also the problem of malaria, which killed, among others, the hospital's masseuse, Olive Smith on 6 October. Although, Ostrovo was up in the hills and the malaria threat was not as bad as in Salonika, it still claimed lives and would ultimately end her term as CMO when she fell victim to the disease as well. Gradually, as the Serbian fighting line pushed the enemy back, the hospital work eased. In late October, she wrote: "Our 400th patient admitted today." By winter conditions became more severe. Fighting died down and the roads became impassable. The hospital was nearly isolated. Cases of scurvy were brought in occasionally, for food was short in the front line. In December, a site was chosen for the outpost hospital at Dobraveni and the personnel was sent off.

By the new year, Bennett was plagued by internal problems and worry over the outpost at Dobraveni. By late winter, German air raids became more frequent and the outpost was moved in March with the help of 100 German prisoners. With summer came the threat of malaria again. Bennett succumbed to the disease and was forced to resign because of ill health. She was replaced by another Australian, Mary De Garis.

For her contributions Bennett was awarded the Serbian Order of St Sava (third class) and the Royal Red Cross of Serbia .

== Later years and death ==
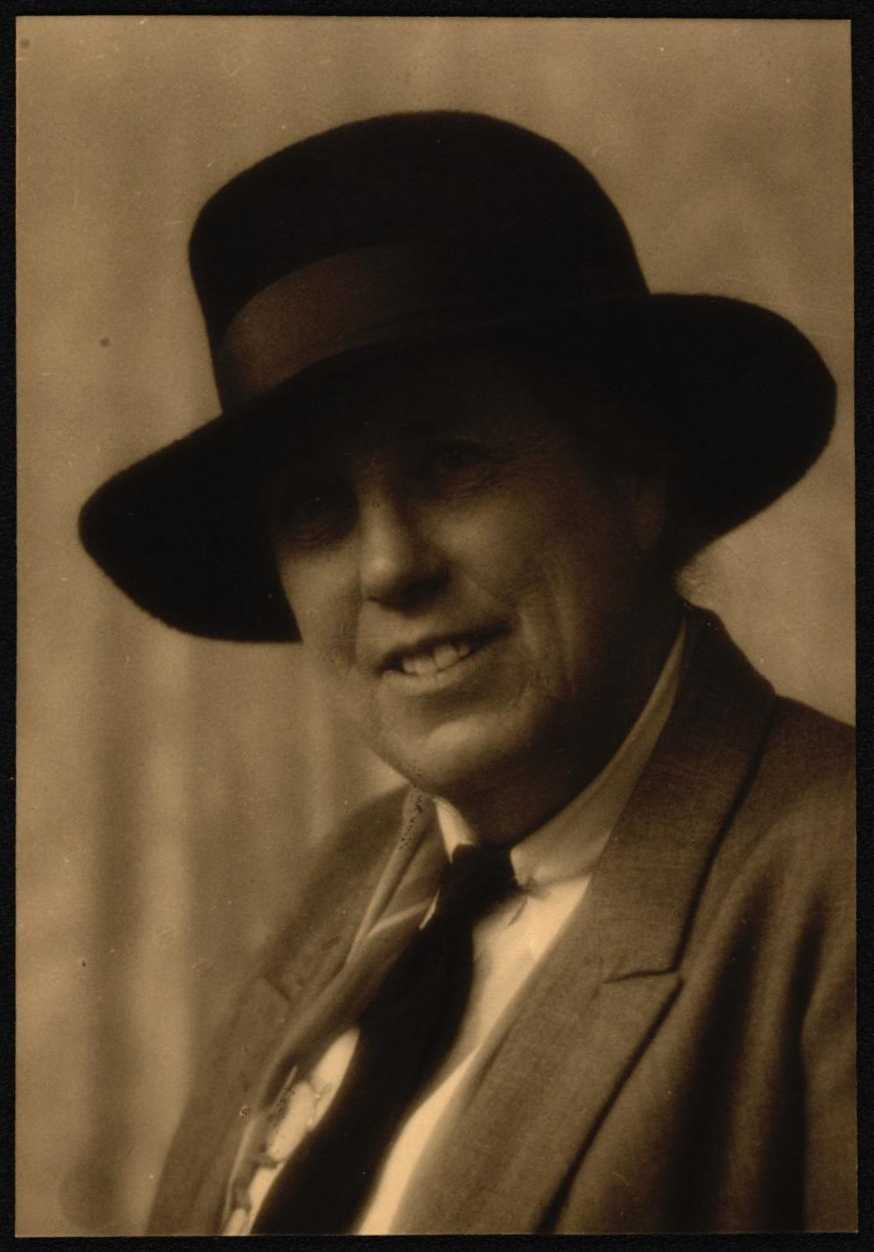
Agnes Bennett passport photo (1931)

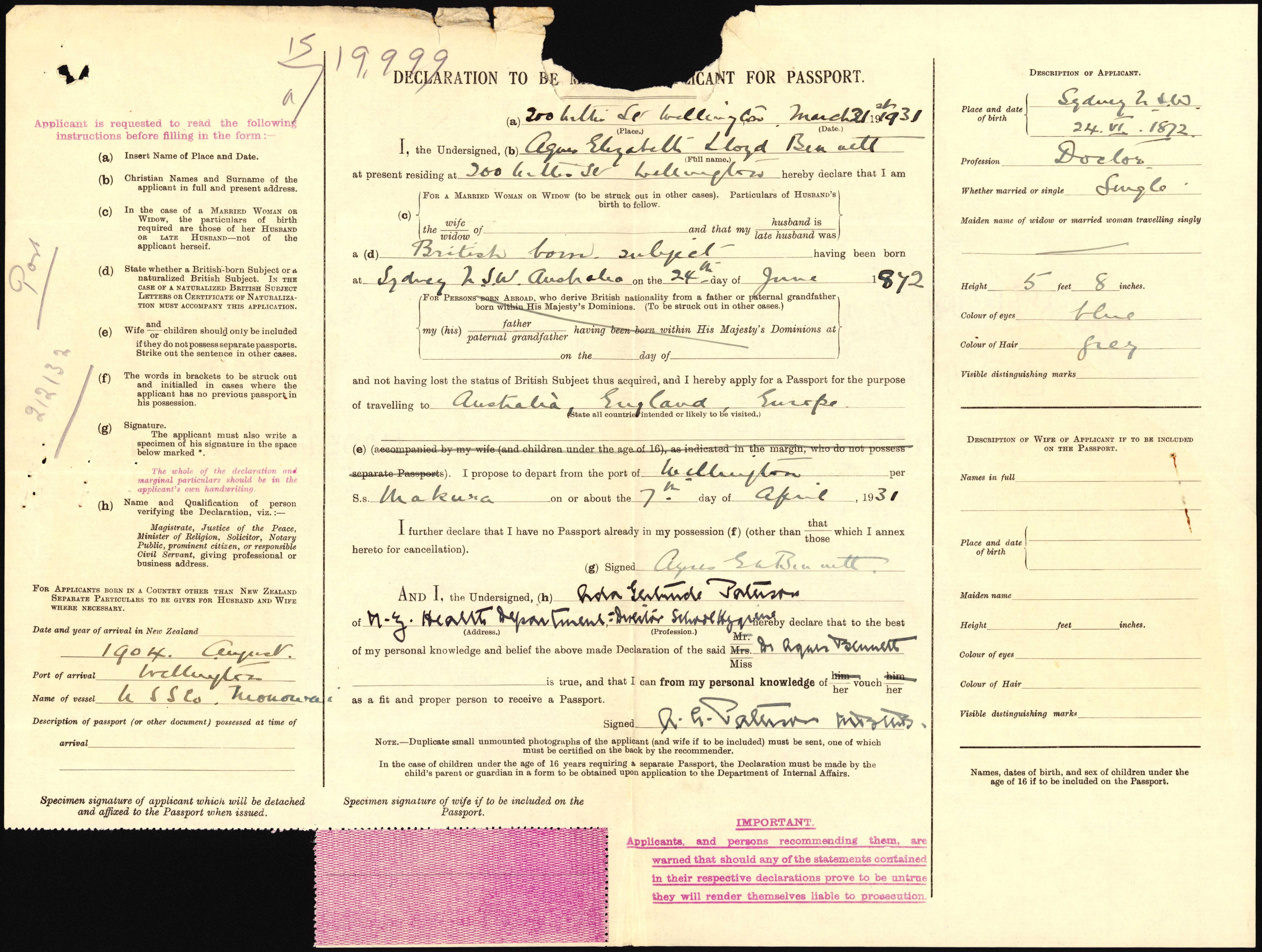
Agnes Bennett passport application (1931)

Bennett became the first president of the Wellington branch of the International Federation of University Women in 1923 and represented New Zealand at its world conference at Cracow, Poland, in 1936. She had visited Australia often since 1905, and in 1938–39 was a medical officer at the hospital at Burketown, North Queensland. She returned to Wellington and in 1939, helped to form the Women's War Service Auxiliary.

Between 1940 and 1942, she worked in English hospitals and, on returning to New Zealand, lectured to the women's services on venereal disease and birth control. In the 1948 King's Birthday Honours, Bennett was appointed an Officer of the Order of the British Empire for services as a medical practitioner in Wellington. She died in Wellington on 27 November 1960 and was cremated with Presbyterian rites. She contributed largely to the improvement of maternal and infant medical care in New Zealand, and through example, argument and organisation, did much to advance women's status.

== See also ==
- Other notable women volunteers in the Scottish Women's Hospitals for Foreign Service
- Women in World War I
- The Serbian campaign (1914-1915)

== Sources ==
- Manson, Cecil and Celia (1960) Doctor Agnes Bennett. London: Michael Joseph.
- Leneman, Leah (1994) In the Service of Life: Story of Elsie Inglis and the Scottish Women's Hospitals. Mercat Press
- Hutton, I Emslie (1928) With a woman's unit in Serbia, Salonika and Sebastopol. London: Williams and Norgate.
- Tolerton, Jane (2017) Make her praises heard afar: New Zealand women overseas in World War One. Wellington: Booklovers Books.
