= Caroline Matthews =

British doctor and war correspondent

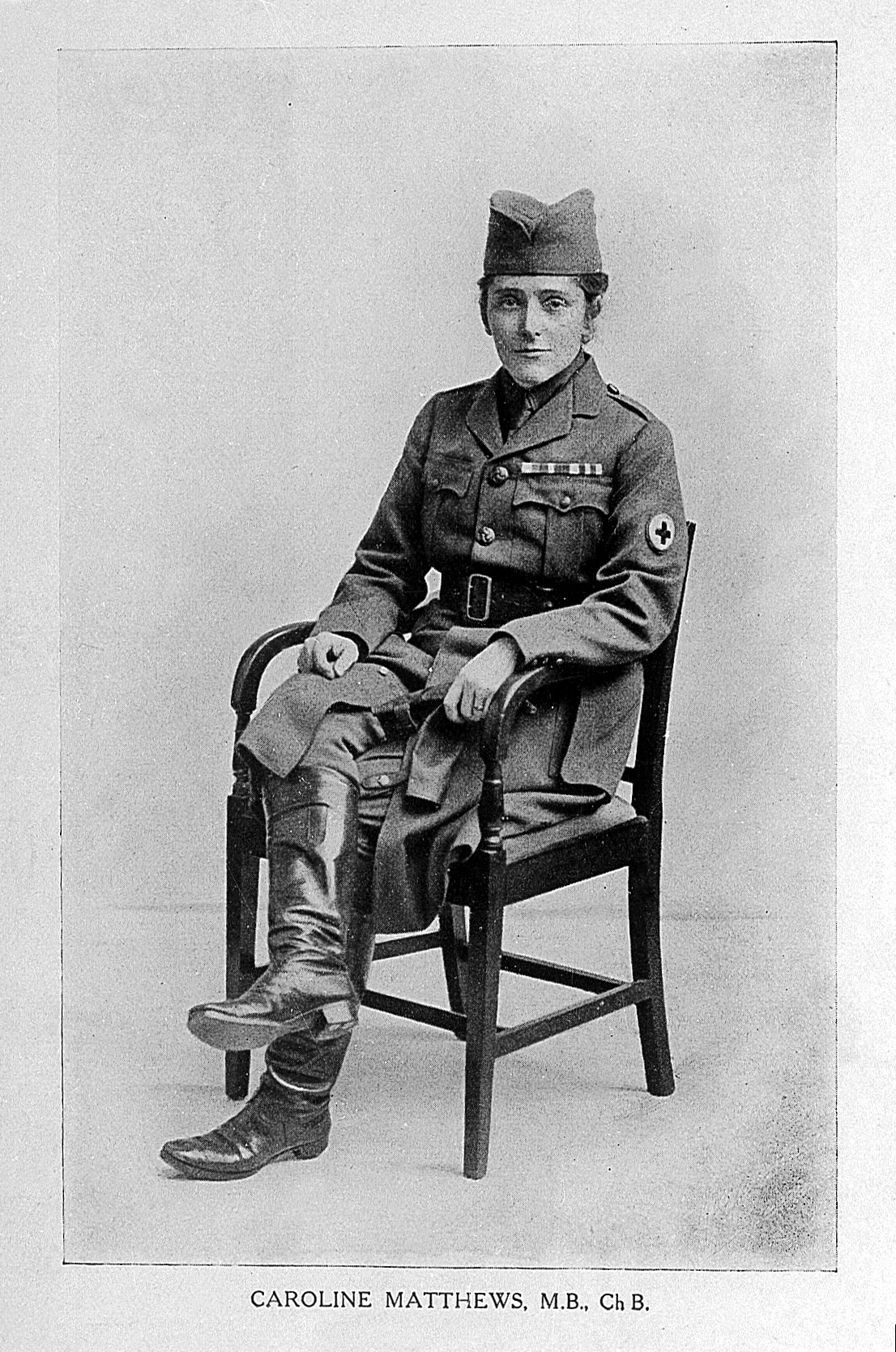
- Born: Twigge; 25 September 1877
- Died: 1927 (aged 49–50)
- Resting place: Downe graveyard, in the grave of her friend Amy Johns
- Education: Edinburgh College of Medicine for Women, MBChB
- Occupations: doctor and war correspondent
- Known for: medical service volunteering 1908 Messina earthquake Montenegro and First World War in the Serbian army and for writing about her experiences
- Honours: King Victor Emmanuel's Medal, Italian Red Cross Medal, King Victor Emmanuel's Commemoration Medal and the Montenegrin Order of Danilo

Caroline Twigge Matthews, MBChB (25 September 1877–1927) was a British doctor and war correspondent, and was dubbed a "war heroine". She served in the Italian Red Cross in the 1908 Messina earthquake, and in military hospitals during the Balkans War and First World War, and was taken as a prisoner of war. She was awarded King Victor Emmanuel's Medal, the Italian Red Cross Medal, King Victor Emmanuel's Commemoration Medal and the Montenegrin Order of Danilo. When she died, the press said she was "The Florence Nightingale of the Balkans."

== Early life and education ==
Caroline Twigge was born on 25 September 1877, to Liverpool parents, John Twigge (1848–1908) and his wife Caroline Sara Twigge, née Sargeant (born 1847), who lived in the Waterloo area of the city, and she was baptised on 26 June 1878. She had two brothers, John S. Twigge (born 1872) who was to become a curate at Waverton-cum-Dundraw, Cumbria before in 1896, being ordained in Carlisle Cathedral to serve in the parish of Ravenstondale, Westmorland. Her younger brother, Herbert L. Twigge (born 1875), had already followed their father into business as a rice and fruit merchant in 1901.

She was privately tutored before went to study medicine in 1898 at the age of 21 in Edinburgh, and was living in Newington, in the 1901 census, and at three addresses during her studies, finally at Masson Hall, George Square. In 1902–1903, her final year as a student, the family holidayed together in Aboyne, Scotland.

Matthews passed the third level professional examinations in medicine and surgery in July 1903, and qualified in medicine on 17 October 1903, after studying as an extra-mural to the University of Edinburgh, based at the Edinburgh College of Medicine for Women. Her academic tutors included analytical chemist, W. I. Macadam, radiologist pioneer Dawson Turner, D.Noel Paton, William Craig, William Russell, Harvey Littlejohn and neurologist Alexander Bruce, as well as Dr Grace Cadell at the New Town dispensary.

She later holidayed as a single woman in Brighton in 1905.

She married Joseph Matthews, a surgeon who was a widower and almost thirty years her senior, in 1907, in the Sheriff Court in St Giles district, Edinburgh, but at the date of her death, she was already a widow.

== Career ==
=== Messina and Calabria disaster ===
Matthews served voluntarily in the 1908 Messina earthquake, when the city lost almost half its population including nurses and doctors. She was among those involved in the international relief effort who were awarded King Victor Emmanuel's Medal.

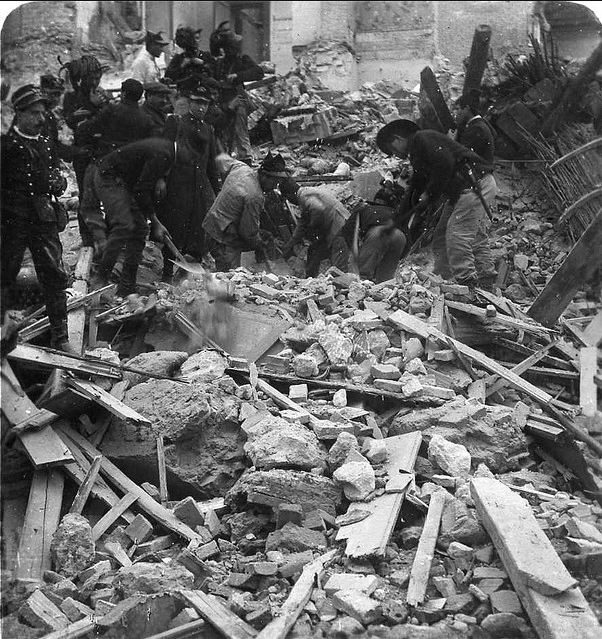
Italian soldiers search in the wreckage of Messina earthquake, 1908

She had been expected to take up a medical role with a leper community in China but did not get there, returning from Tibet on a ship specially chartered to lend assistance to Italy. Matthews was said to have been simply treated as one of the soldiers when attached to the Grenadiers and had seen "horrors unspeakable" or "gruesome sights", including an "inferno worse than that depicted by Dante", whilst working to save lives in this destructive disaster. In 1910, Matthews was the only woman, and the only English speaker, among the soldiers assisting civilians in the village of Cinquefronde, Calabria, where a smallpox infection was also rife and the town was placed "under the yellow flag". She herself had to rest with an unspecified "serious illness" in Rome, before being able to return home.

Her former associates at The Gentlewoman magazine's Children's Salon wrote rather romantically of her: "Sturdily the stranger in the camp, [she] worked with a will, sharing the hardship of the men."

In 1911 she was honoured with the Italian Red Cross medal and the King Victor Emmanuel's Commemoration Medal.

== War service experiences ==
=== Balkan War 1912–1913 Montenegro ===
In 1912–1913 she became a surgeon in the Montenegrin army and war correspondent for The Sphere. She was awarded another honour, that of the Order of Danilo.

Her war diary articles, for example, in The Sphere of January 1913, explain more about her experiences; for example, in an incident when Matthews was going to the aid of an injured officer at night in a blizzard, she fell on the rough road. Whilst trying to protect the medical supplies she carried, she fractured her jaw, broke some teeth and got cuts to her face. She continued on with the journey and task of treating the man's wounded leg, and, after a few days for her own recovery, returned to her hospital post. Matthews also spoke of the continuing patriotic attitude of the Montenegrin people, despite their extremes of poverty and severity of many people's injuries. In her article, she also comments on the relative comfort of the Turkish prisoners of war.

In November 1912, in The Gentlewoman, an item titled "A Lady Doctor at the Front", tells that she was in Syria before volunteering for military hospital work, and thus was inappropriately clothed for the Balkan weather. Her recollections give gossipy details of her journey, contrasting with a matter of fact approach to detailing the wounded in body and mind she came across during concerns with poor quality hygiene and a lack of resources, in the military hospital. She recounts there were 4,000 wounded treated per week, with only amateur nurses and even children as "ward orderlies", but surprisingly only 16 deaths, despite her own language problems and lack of support from Russian doctors. She also praises the courage and chivalry of the injured men, whom she calls "brave, patient, grateful" ... but longing to be "out" serving at the front again.

=== First World War ===
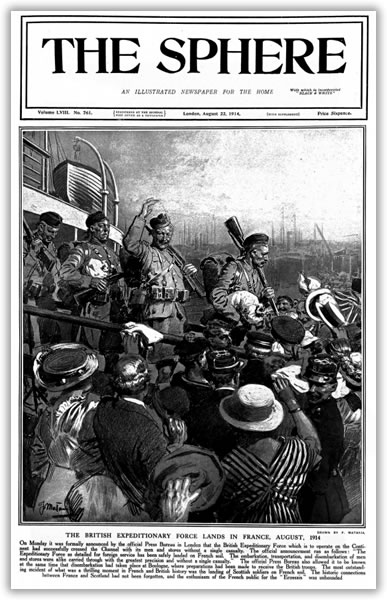
The Sphere magazine

As the First World War began, Matthews again volunteered, this time to serve in Serbia, at her own expense, and became a medical officer in the Serbian army after her plan to join the Serbian Field Ambulance service had been denied. She said (unlike many middle- or upper-class women of the day who lacked her resilience) that as she used her skills, she felt that 'Life was worth living in these days.' Her articles for The Sphere formed an illustrated war diary e.g. in July 1915, describing the Scottish Women's unit travelling to Malta to assist the evacuated wounded, and then to Greece, and on to Nish (Niš) in Serbia. She touches on the relationships between captors and prisoners of war, and praises the international group of women (and men) working in the military hospitals in very difficult circumstances, including during a severe outbreak of typhus, which killed two of the Scottish Women's Hospital's doctors.

Her final role in the field was in volunteering to stay with the wounded, and in charge of the military hospital at Uzsitsi, for the Serbian Red Cross, after the Serbian retreat on 13 October 1915, although she knew she would be captured by the advancing Austrian allied forces. This happened in the night, with German soldiers pushing her, threatening and bullying her, whilst they searched her room for medications. As she had later refused to treat the occupying army who had stolen patients' blankets, she was accused of espionage, and taken as a prisoner to Belgrade. She was eventually released to the Scottish Women's Ambulance Unit, in Hungary, and allowed to leave with them, but had further challenges running into German 'spies' whilst travelling through Switzerland, one of whom she was said to have pushed off the train at Lucerne.

Matthews was pictured under the heading "Lady Doctor in Khaki" on the front page of The Sheffield Independent on her return. Her dress in breeches and an officer-like coat had drawn comment, but was most practical for riding.

=== Correspondence from the front ===
The Sphere published Matthew's war experience updates on 1 April and again on 22 April 1916, in two-page illustrated features, titled "In the Hands of the Enemy – A Personal Narrative by Dr. Caroline Matthews". She was explaining the need for at some times being brave and defiant, and at others more cautious and reserved, in conversations with her captors. Despite physical attacks, she described her determination not to allow the Germans "the desired-for satisfaction of seeing fear in British eyes". Matthews also wrote a series of articles on the same themes for The Courier, titled "In the Hands of the Hun – The Experiences of a Woman Doctor in Serbia".

Her war experiences, together describing "perhaps the most extraordinary time of a varied life", were published by Mills & Boon in a book Experiences of a Woman Doctor in Serbia in 1916, which she dedicated "in love and gratitude to Amy M. Johns, a friend in a thousand".

The book was described by The Courier as "a graphic panorama" and "a thrilling narrative". She gave details, such as working amicably with the Hungarian chief medical officer during a deadly diphtheria outbreak, who was to be replaced by a "coward" CMO, who would not enter the cholera ward, but left Matthews in charge. She detailed her tales of the enemy arriving, taking all the patients' blankets for their troops and stealing her medical instruments and money. But she said she was "cheered and encouraged by a little Union Jack on a chocolate box". Matthews explains that she caught diphtheria herself and felt desperate but "crawled" round the wards. Her tales include the brutality on the night of her capture, then being taken in "a bullock-cart, through bitter weather" as a prisoner under escort, suffering various deprivations, including such hunger that she had traded her wedding ring for chocolate.

In her own words, quoted in The Yorkshire Post, despite experiencing evil spirits in men's eyes, cunning and blood-lust, Matthews had "never met before such peculiarly fiendish expressions of absolute hatred as were directed towards me by those Teutonic officers".

During a hearing and interrogation on the trumped-up spy charge, Matthews defiantly complained of her treatment and the thefts, to be told "there was no Geneva Convention now". And she recounted the pleasure of suddenly hearing a familiar voice call "How are you, Twiggie!" It was Dr Alice Hutchison from the Scottish Women's Hospital (31 of whom were also held captive there).

These episodes contrast with later encounters with shepherds whilst recuperating from her illness in 1916 on "Christmas Day in Jerusalem", in another article in The Sphere.

Her work was compared with autobiographical writing from another woman who became a volunteer fighter in the Serbian army, Flora Sandes, whose memoirs were aimed at raising money for the Serbs. Matthews' stories and the consideration of her bravery in press reports, travelled to Australia, as well as across the regional press in Britain. It was said that her Experiences book could be seen as "a monument to the almost superhuman courage and daring of Dr Caroline Matthews"; and was "an unaffected story of courage and devotion to duty" which "does honour to her native country"; and "a moving story of self-sacrifice and heroism", and it has been republished a century later.

== Publications ==
- Hints of a Lady Doctor (1905)
- "A Lady Doctor at the Front" (article in The Gentlewoman) (1912)
- "With the Montenegrins – How Hunger and Starvation are Facing the Brave Fighters of the Little Kingdom" (article in The Sphere) (1913)
- "With the Wounded Serbs at Nish: A Personal Narrative by a British Red Cross Worker in Serbia" (article in The Sphere) (1915)
- "In the Hands of the Enemy – A Personal Narrative by Dr. Caroline Matthews" (article in The Sphere) (1916)
- Experiences of a Woman Doctor in Serbia, book, published by Mills & Boon London (1916)
- "In the hands of the enemy" (article in The Sphere) (1916)
- "Christmas Day in Jerusalem – How I met the Shepherds in their Leopard-Skin Cloaks and Helped to Revive their Frozen Lambs in the Monastery of Marielas (or Mar Elyas)" (article in The Sphere) (1916)

== Personal life post-war ==
After the war, Matthews continued her friendship with, and became "devotedly attached" to, Amy Maria Johns, to whom she had dedicated her 1916 Experiences book. Amy Johns wrote a poem to Matthews, as the foreword:

A woman child. She dreamed the dreams of men.
Of fiery purposes, and battles' din.
She left her dolls to play with soldier toys,
And glow'd in enterprise of heroes bold.
Such child –
Grown to the kingdom of her woman's heart,
Goes forth with joy beneath her country's flag.
Gives of her skill to those who call for aid.
She faces death in many a cruel guise,
Holding life cheap, for honour and her King.

Matthews and Johns went travelling together, after the war, in India for more than a year, but Johns died suddenly in 1923, on a train from Dover to London on her return, and was buried at Downe. As Matthews had had an interest in Spiritualism, and a medium had predicted her (own) sudden death, which she had believed would occur due to her residual ill health (including suffering "heart attacks") "as a result of her privations while serving as a doctor during the Serbian retreat", she had transferred £500 of war bonds to Johns. But it was in the event Johns who had died first. Matthews then contested her friend's will for re-transfer of these bonds but this was denied. Despite that dispute, her friend's family gave permission for Matthews to be eventually buried in Johns' grave, when she died in 1927. Matthews' own estate was valued as £1904.

== Death and memorial ==
Matthews' health was indeed harmed from her war experiences, and she died of pneumonia after influenza at the age of 49, at home in Longton Grove, Sydenham and buried in Amy Johns' grave in the small cemetery at Downe, near Farnborough. The funeral was taken by the local vicar, Reverend A. A. Gibson, and was given "very many floral tributes" with a range of "expressions of affection and regret". Matthews was called "The Florence Nightingale of the Balkans" in the Evening Telegraph.

Her uniform and other war possessions were sought by the National War Museum. Now Matthews' khaki rucksack, mentioned in her book, and her graduation gown as well as some of her field medical equipment, and medals, are in the Science Museum or Wellcome library medical collection.
