= Ostrovo Unit =

Field hospital of the Scottish Women's Hospital

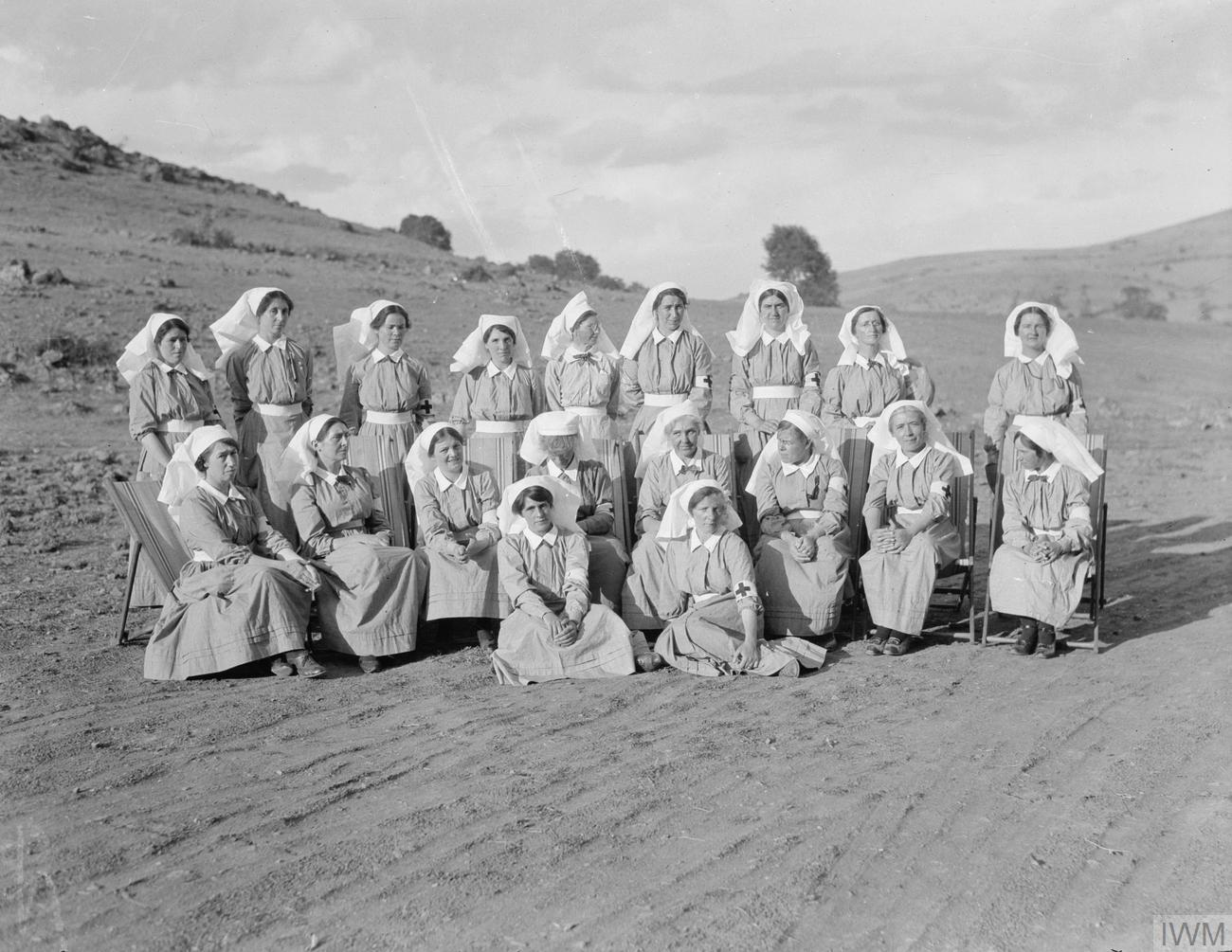
Women of the (America) Unit of the Scottish Women's Hospital at Ostrovo

The Ostrovo Unit was a field hospital unit with the Transport Column of the Scottish Women's Hospitals. It comprised approximately 200 beds and was situated near Lake Ostrovo (or Lake Vegoritida in the Greek region of Macedonia) during the First World War under the command of the Serbian Army. It was often called The America Unit as the money to fund it came from America and except for a few dressing stations, it was the Allied hospital nearest the front.

== Beginnings ==
Dr Agnes Elizabeth Lloyd Bennett, an Australian, New Zealand doctor had travelled to London in May 1916, and met with Elsie Inglis at the Lyceum club. They knew each other because Inglis has been the dean of the College of Medicine for Women at the University of Edinburgh while Bennett was completing her studies there. Inglis and the SWH were recuperating and regrouping after the Great Retreat, and were recruiting more staff. Bennett had just been working in an infectious diseases hospital in Cairo, and was looking for another role to assist the war effort. Inglis tasked her with establishing a new SWH unit to be deployed to Greece where she would lead as the Chief Medical Officer. Bennett travelled to Scotland to recruit 55 staff members and organise supplies, including the fleet of model-T Fords which were to be converted to Ambulances for an attached transport column, initially commanded by English suffragist Katherine Harley. Bennett took discipline seriously, and she was concerned by the behaviour of the women in Harley's unit who she felt were unruly, After three months the transport column was also placed under her authority. Initially they planned to be based in Salonika, however on arrival the plan changed due to the fighting front shifting to Macedonia. So the unit ended up being based close to the front line, in the hills at Lake Ostrovo.

The unit opened in September 1916 soon after the Battle of Malka Nidzhe (Gornichevo ridge). Gornichevo ridge formed the twin summits of Kaimaktsalan, 7,700 and 8,200 feet above sea level. This ridge had to be captured before Monastir (Bitola on modern British maps) could be re-taken. Bennett recorded on the first day that they took 24 cases: "all terribly bad wounds – abdominal, chest, head and compound fractures". On 25 September she wrote: "We now have 160 cases, all bad and it is terribly hard work." During the first eight weeks the America Unit admitted 425 cases of whom sixty died.

== Location ==
The unit was approximately ninety miles west of Salonika and was in a beautiful location. According to its third CMO Dr Isobel Emslie:

"It lay quite by itself on a green sward in the hollow of the hills which rose on every side; close by was a clump of ancient elm-trees, the home of families of cawing rooks, and beyond the white tents of the hospital lay Lake Ostrovo."

Miles Franklin wrote: "The royal sunlight on the purple hills! Blue as heaven, high and peaked like cats' teeth, they intensified a longing for the Blue Bogongs that was ten years poignant." Franklin was inspired to write a story, By Far Kaimaktchalan and a piece entitled Somewhere in the Balkans but finished neither. Ne Mari Nishta (It matters nothing) remains her only finished account of her time there. She left in February 1918.

== Staff ==
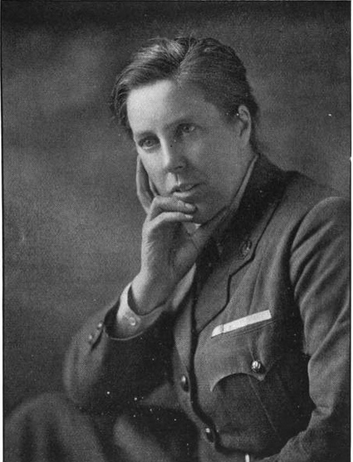
Chief Medical Officer, Ostrovo Unit, Dr. Agnes Bennett

The America Unit was the unit of the Scottish Women's Hospitals in which at least ten Australian women served. Other Australians served in a similar unit near Salonika. The Anglo-Irish medical physicist Edith Anne Stoney provided x-ray support to the unit while being based at Salonika.

Australian doctor Lilian Violet Cooper, who was born in Britain, but had spent the last 25 years living in Queensland, travelled to Europe to volunteer with the SWH with her long-term companion Mary Josephine Bedford, arriving at the Ostrovo unit in September 1916. Cooper was the third surgeon to join the unit, and Bedford, who had mechanical knowledge, managed the ambulance fleet, becoming the Chief Transport Officer. Bedford's ability to source spare parts for the fleet of 12 converted T-model Ford ambulances led to her the nickname 'Miss Spare Parts'. Cooper herself had a habit of using foul language when stressed, which Bennett disapproved of, however, she appreciated the work both Cooper and Bedford put into the unit. Cooper was a skilled surgeon, who was popular in the unit, especially with the young ambulance drivers, as she encouraged their new found freedom to wear trousers, cut their hair short, and take up smoking. These freedoms alleviated the difficulty of their work, transporting seriously wounded and dying patients along very rough and rocky trails, fixing the ambulances when broken down, or getting them un-bogged from deep potholes.

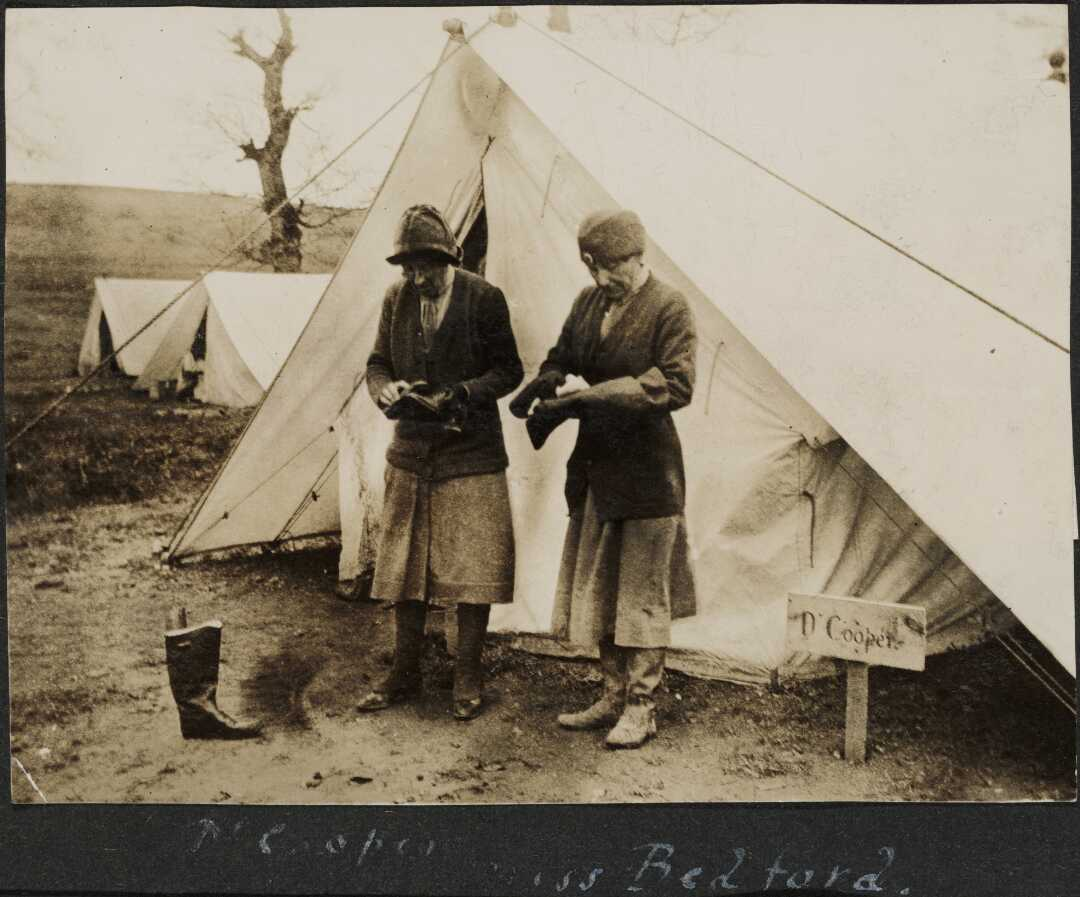
Dr. Lilian Cooper and Josephine Bedford, Serbia c.1916-1917

With the fighting 25 km away, it took the Ambulances three to four hours to travel via narrow mule tracks, over rough terrain. This was too long for some of the wounded who died on the journey. So in late 1916, Bennett received permission from the local Serbian commander to open a dressing station, a small tent hospital of 25 beds, at Dobraveni, closer to the fighting, where their staff would be rotated every 6 weeks, due to the intensity of the work, and the freezing conditions. The site was in the foothills of Voras Mountains, and was desolate, treeless and windy.

British masseuse and trained physical instructor, Olive Smith who had joined the unit with Dr Bennett from the start, and worked in the operating theatre and reception, died of malaria on 6 October 1916.

In February 2017 a new recruit, Australian doctor Mary De Garis from Melbourne, arrived at the Ostrovo unit, and in her first month she alleviated Cooper from her rotation shift at Dobraveni. She was tasked with supervising the dressing station's camp reassembly after a recent move. De Garis found the constant air raids added a 'spice of excitement' to life, and the trenches, or 'funk holes' provided effective shelter. After the Australian Army had refused her application to serve in 1915, De Garis had stayed working as a doctor in Australia until mid-1916. This was when her fiancé Sergeant Colin Thomson, who had survived Gallipoli, was deployed to the Western Front. De Garis's anxiety for him saw her travel to London, arriving on 14 July 1916, to take a role at the Manor War Hospital, as a means to be closer to him. However, soon after arriving, Thomson's postcards stopped and De Garis received the news that he had died on 4 August, at the battle at Pozieres. In the following months, she channelled her grief into taking action, resigning from the Manor War Hospital, and applying to the SWH. In December 2016, her application was accepted, and she was appointed as Bennett's second in command.

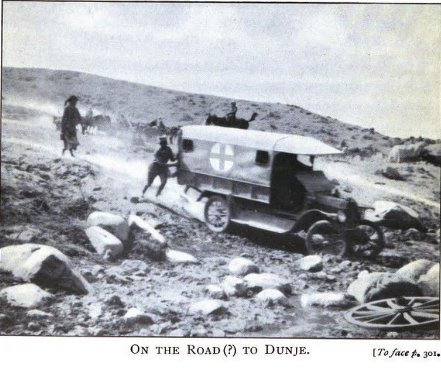
SWH Ambulance in Macedonia

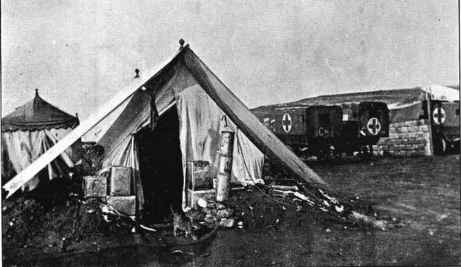
Dressing station at Dobroveni

Australian novelist, Stella Miles Franklin joined the unit in July 1917. On her journey from London, she travelled through Paris, Turin, Rome, and Taranto, before boarding a troop transport carrying 3000 men, with only two other women, destined for Salonika. Once in Salonika she travelled to Ostrovo on a drive that she would describe as "the roughest journey I ever underwent". Working first as a cook then as an Matron's orderly, she was in charge of the stores of linen, bedding, clothing, and dressings. She said the work was hard physical labour, and they worked long hours, with only a half day free each week, and one full day per month. When they had free time, she would join the nurses for a swim in Lake Ostrovo, where she said they could be seen "dancing a spirited reel on the shores in their bathing tights".

The Ostrovo hospital camp had issues with outbreaks of diseases, and illness. They had problems with sanitation as the tented camp was not sewered. The site also had many flies and wasps, and there were outbreaks of malaria, endemic to the area, spread by mosquitos. Bennett, and De Garis, and the staff had to pay careful attention to establishing and maintaining hygienic latrines and urinals so that outbreaks of diseases such as dysentery and infection diarrhoea were minimised. They took care to regularly fill latrines, taking note of previous locations. De Garis attempted to address the issues with malaria by ordering a nearby swamp to be drained. The staff covered up and put up mosquito nets. If anyone recorded a high temperature, they would immediately be administered with painful and dreaded intramuscular quinine injections, which was the most effective treatment at the time. Franklin described these as 'bayonet charges'.

After eight months at the Ostrovo unit, having performed 144 surgeries, Cooper's reoccurring bronchitis developed into pneumonia in August 1917. Cooper and Bedford departed for London, where Cooper would recuperate, before they returned home to Brisbane. They were both awarded the Order of St Sava, Cooper a 4th Class, and Bedford a 5th class, for their service in the unit.

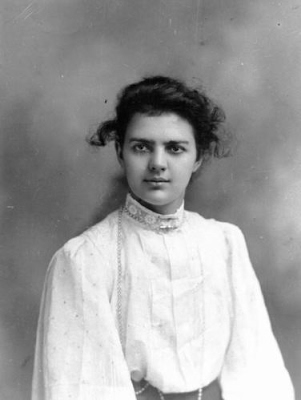
Dr. Mary De Garis, Chief Medical Officer

The next month Bennett caught malaria while at the Dobroveni dressing station. She became very unwell, and when the ambulance returned to the main camp, her colleagues were shocked at how ill she was. So, after 16 months she had to resign due to ill-health. She returned to Egypt, where she learned of her brother Bob's death at the Battle of Passchendaele. Deep in grief, she boarded the troopship HMAT Wiltshire to return to Australia. De Garis took over the Ostrovo unit as the Chief Medical Officer. Bennett was awarded a Serbian Order of St. Sava third class for her contributions as the Chief Medical Officer of the Ostrovo Unit in The SWH.

Franklin worked for 6 months, until she contracted malaria and was removed to London in February 1918.

De Garis would stay as CMO for another year. In that time she, like most SWH staff, would suffer through bouts of serious sickness including typhoid, dysentery, and malaria. However, she remained an effective leader. She was a strict disciplinarian, but fair according to her staff, who saw her as their "guide, philosopher and friend'. She continued to experience deep mourning for Thomson, and this was compounded in June 1918 when her mother died unexpectedly from a heart attack. Missing her family, she resigned as CMO in September 1918. She said of her time in Macedonia:

"I shall always remember my association with the SWH with pleasure. Practical experience has convinced me that women run things very well, making me a more ardent feminist than ever".

De Garis was awarded a third class Order of St. Sava medal for her service.

Following De Garis's resignation, Dr. Isobel Emslie became the third and final Chief Medical Officer, who led the unit to the end of the war.

In Dr Isobel Emslie's words:

"The spirit of this unit was a very pleasant one; the big, happy family of women was so entirely thrown on its own resources that it formed a very united body. Most of the sisters had been so much with the Serbians that they had learnt the language and were thoroughly in sympathy with them. Ours was a Serbian Army hospital, and we took our orders directly from Army Headquarters."

At the advanced dressing station established three hours drive further up Kaimaktsalan the unit took casualties direct from the battlefield. Dr Bennett wrote of the girls' courage during bombardment. However malaria and dysentery took such a toll on the staff that the station was closed in September 1917.

== Closure of the Unit ==
On 30 September 1918 the unit received news of the armistice with Bulgaria and on the morning of 23 October the unit started for northern Serbia with a convoy of nine vehicles on a 311 kilometre trek. All the staff made the trip and the unit set up in an abandoned army barracks in Vranje. The unit was in operation until October 1919. Fifty two of the members of the Vranje Unit were decorated with the Royal Red Cross and several also received the Order of Saint Sava.
