= Alexander Philip =

Scottish solicitor and campaigner

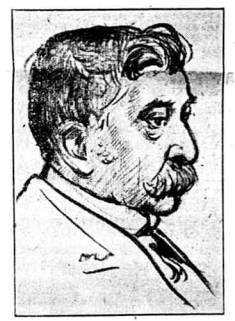
- Alexander Philip, FRSE
- Born: 22 May 1858; Portobello
- Died: 21 January 1932 (aged 73); Dundee
- Occupation: Solicitor
- Years active: 1884–1932
- Known for: Calendar reform
- Relatives: Cecil Reddie, education reformer, cousin; Sir Robert William Philip, pioneer against tuberculosis, cousin; Adam Philip, Minister General Assembly, cousin

Alexander Philip FRSE (22 May 1858 – 21 January 1932) was a Scottish solicitor and campaigner for calendar reform. He was elected a Fellow of the Royal Society of Edinburgh in 1913

== Life ==
He was born in Portobello, Edinburgh on 22 May 1858, the son of Reverend Alexander Philip, minister of Cruden, one of four brothers all of whom were ministers who left the established Church of Scotland to join the Free Church at the Disruption. Rev. Alexander Philip latterly held charge of the Free Church at Dunfermline and Portobello.

Alexander Philip was educated at George Watson's College in Edinburgh and then studied law at the University of Edinburgh where he graduated MA and LLB.

He began his legal apprenticeship at Webster, Will & Ritchie at 37 Queen Street in Edinburgh, where the junior partner was a son of Charles Will, Provost of Brechin. Following the death of Charles Will, Alexander Philip then became an assistant at C & J Will in Brechin, entering into a partnership with the Provost's other son, James Will in 1887. The firm was then renamed Will and Philip, then later Ferguson, Will and Philip. The firm still survives (as of 2017) as Ferguson and Will on Clerk St in Brechin.

During his time in Brechin, he became an important pillar of the community, active in both social and public life. He was clerk to the Brechin district committee; and Menmuir parish council. He was a Justice of the Peace and honorary Sheriff Substitute for the county and in 1899 was appointed to joint secretary of the committee to fund-raise for Brechin Cathedral's restoration. John Honeymann and Keppie drew up plans for the cathedral's restoration and, after the restoration completed in 1902, drew up plans for Alexander Philip's house, The Mary Acre.

In 1913 he was elected a Fellow of the Royal Society of Edinburgh. His proposers were Cargill Gilston Knott, Sir Robert William Philip, Andrew William Kerr and William Allan Carter.

== Calendar Reform ==
Alexander Philip was perhaps best known for his proposals on Calendar Reform, which were first aired in 1906 as the "Proposals for a Simplified Calendar". His suggestions were incorporated into the Calendar Reform Bill, presented by Robert Pearce in 1912.

The main change that Alexander Philip advocated for was the transfer of a day from August to February to provide each quarter with 91 days (exactly 13 weeks), so that each quarter would be identical, and creating a 364-day year such that all fixed dates (Christmas Day, New Year's Day etc.) would fall on the same day of the week each year. He also argued for the fixing "movable feasts" such as Easter to fixed dates. and spoke at conferences at the Royal Society of Edinburgh, and in London and Geneva.

=== Proposed Reforms ===
In The Calendar: Its History, Structure and Improvement Alexander Philip outlined his principal objections to the Gregorian calendar, namely that most civil events involve a reference to both the Calendar date and the day of the week. He divided these dates into two classes:

1. Legal terms, such as dates of sitting and rising for law courts, schools and universities. Additionally such statutory dates as dates for regular meetings and statutory returns such as tax returns as well as quarterly term days for maturities of bills etc. Also included were civil fete days that fall on a fixed day of the month or year.
2. Movable feasts of the Church, such as Easter. Also included in this category were meetings fixed to particular week days, such as magistrate meetings, local markets and fairs. He noted that where a market or festival falls on the first Wednesday in July one town, and on the first Thursday in another, sometimes these will be adjacent and at other times 6 days apart.

Alexander Philip sought to resolve 3 identified deficiencies:

1. Unequal-length quarters, by an equal division of 364 days (i.e. 91 days per quarter) and 1–2 days left over.
2. Minimising variation in the length of months by having a standard month-length of 30 days and 1 month of 31 each quarter.
3. Convenient Apportionment of weeks, months and quarters with each quarter to consist of exactly, 3 months, 13 weeks or 91 days.

His principal objections to the Invariable Calendar was the, in his opinion, "unnecessary amount of change" for the sake of symmetrical appearance with the rhythmical order of 31, 30, 30 or 30, 30, 31. His belief was that the transfer of one day from August to February would largely resolve these issues. The 31 May would become the year day, with Saturday 30 May, followed by Year Day 31 May; and then Sunday 1 June. In leap years February would have 30 days, and the additional day would similarly be known as Leap Day and not any particular day of the week. His choice of these dates for exclusion was with the aim of starting each quarter on a Sunday and ending on a Saturday. In this regard, he aligned his quarters not with the Calendar year, but with the Ecclesiastical calendar starting with December.

A further consequence of these changes would be that the variation in the date of Easter would fall from 35 days to 22 until at least 2199. However, he argued for the fixing of the date of Easter as Sunday 12 April as approximating the probably date of the resurrection. Equally 50 days thereafter, the date for Pentecost would fall exactly on the 31 May, the date commonly used to commemorate it.

Alexander Philip sought to introduce these changes on 29 February 1920.

== Selected bibliography ==
=== Calendar Reform ===
- Philip, Alexander (1914). The Reform of the Calendar. Kegan Paul, Trench, Trübner & Co., Ltd. ISBN 978-5518534445. "Link". Link (1.4 MB)
- Philip, Alexander (1920). The Practical Advantages of Calendar Reform. William Blackwood & Sons Ltd.
- Philip, Alexander (1921). The Calendar: Its History, Structure and Improvement. Cambridge University Press. ISBN 978-1107640214. "Link". Link (1.4 MB)
- Philip, Alexander (1930). The Essentials of Calendar Reform. G. Routledge & Sons Ltd.

=== Others ===
- Philip, Alexander (1890). The Function of Labour in the Production of Wealth. Blackwood. "Link". Link (8.3 MB)
- Philip, Alexander (1913). The Dynamic Foundation of Knowledge. Kegan Paul, Trench, Trübner & Co., Ltd. "Link". (126 MB)
- Philip, Alexander (1915). Essays Towards a Theory of Knowledge. G. Routledge & Sons Ltd. "Link". (8.3 MB)
