= The Sphere (newspaper) =

British newspaper (1900–1964)

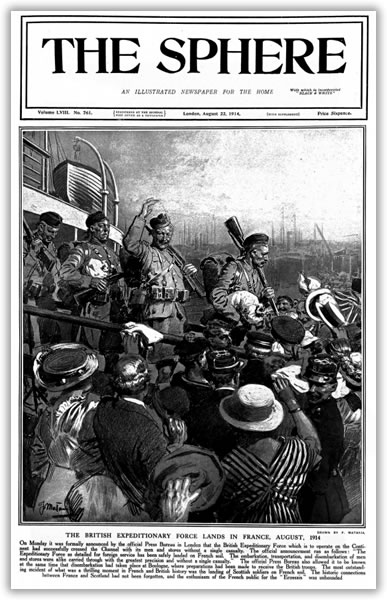
An edition of The Sphere from 1914.

The Sphere: An Illustrated Newspaper for the Home and, later, The Sphere: The Empire's Illustrated Weekly, was a British newspaper, published by London Illustrated Newspapers weekly from 27 January 1900 until the closure of the paper on 27 June 1964.

== Background ==
The first issue came out at the height of the Boer War and was a product of that conflict and the public appetite for images. At the time, it was in direct competition with The Graphic and Illustrated London News, and evidence of this rivalry can be seen in the latter's publication shortly after of a new illustrated paper entitled The Spear in an attempt to confuse readers. During World War I, the weekly issues were called 'war numbers' and over two hundred appeared between 1914 and 1919. In all, it totalled 3,343 issues, plus a special supplement issued in January 1965, entitled Winston Churchill: A Memorial Tribute.

The Sphere was founded by Clement Shorter (1857–1926), who also founded Tatler in the following year. It covered general news stories from the UK and around the world; much of the overseas news features were reported in detail as the title was targeted at British citizens living in the colonies.

It was similar to the Illustrated London News, another paper containing many graphic illustrations. Those featured in The Sphere were by renowned artists including W. G. Whitaker and Montague Dawson. Other illustrators included Sidney Paget, Henry Matthew Brock, Fortunino Matania, Ernest Prater, Edmund Blampied, Victor Coverley-Price and Claude Grahame Muncaster (1903–1974); photographers included Christina Broom (1862–1939); and writers included Bryher, Eleanour Sinclair Rohde, and Michael Wolff, and Balkans war heroine Dr Caroline Matthews. Thomas Hardy's short story A Changed Man was first published in The Sphere, in two instalments in the 21 and 28 April 1900 editions. During World War I the newspaper was bought by the shipping magnate John Ellerman. The Sphere was very popular during World War II.

The British Library and the National Library of Scotland hold copies of the entire publication run of this newspaper. The Sphere is searchable on the British Newspaper Archive.

== In popular culture ==
In the film Three Faces East (1930), set in England during WWI, Frances Hawtree (Constance Bennett) peruses a copy of The Sphere.

== Sources ==
- Illustrated London News Picture Library website
- Information on the Illustrated London News Group
- Thomas Hardy's A Changed Man
