= Robert William Philip =

Scottish physician (1857–1939)

Sir Robert William Philip FRCPE FRCP FRSE FRCSE
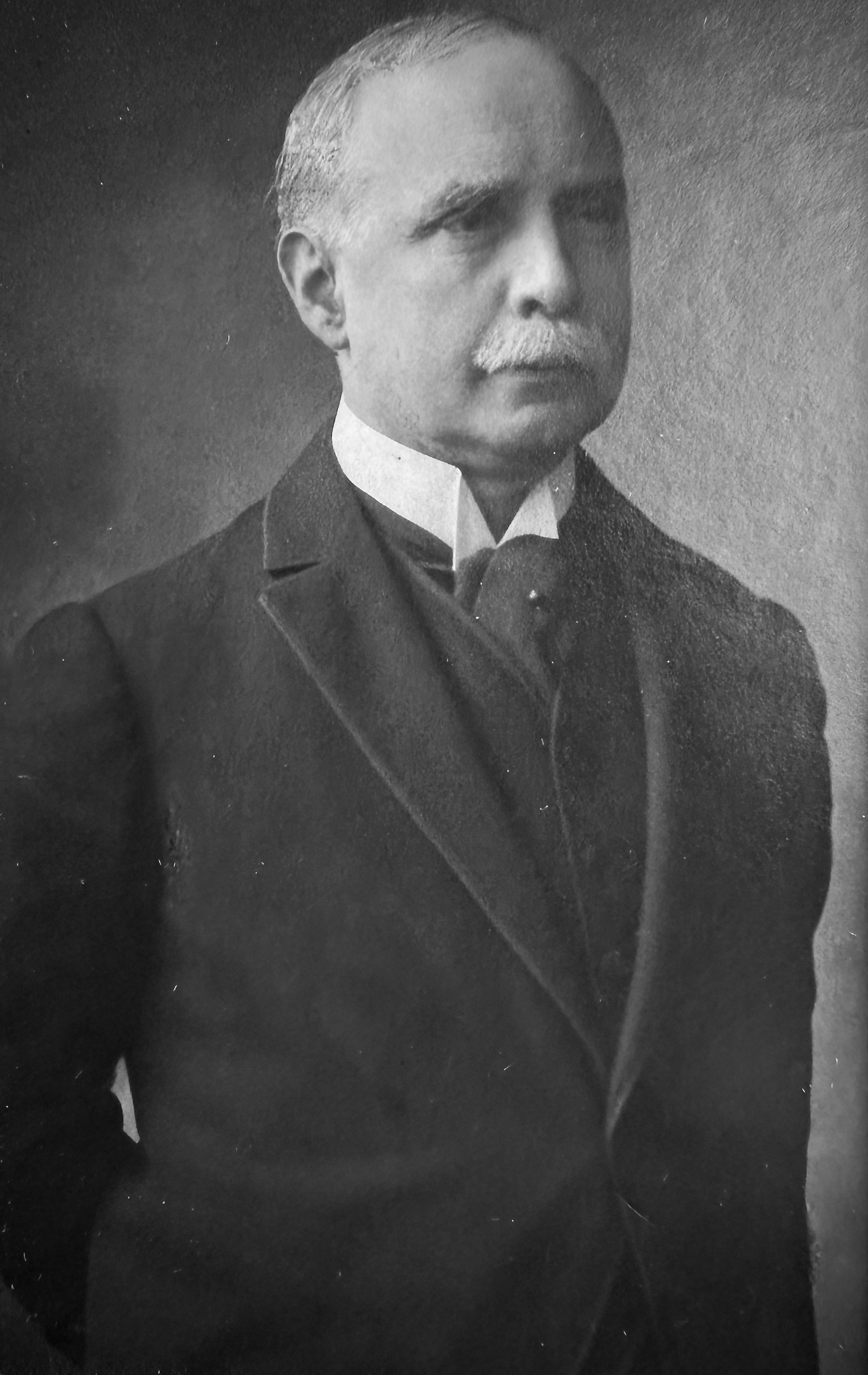
- Born: 29 December 1857; Govan, Renfrewshire
- Died: 25 January 1939 (aged 81); Edinburgh, Scotland
- Occupations: Extra-Physician to HM the King in Scotland; Consulting Physician, Royal Infirmary, Edinburgh; Professor of Tuberculosis, University of Edinburgh
- Years active: 1887 - 1939
- Known for: the treatment of tuberculosis
- Relatives: Elizabeth Motherwell (wife) (m.1888); Edith McGaw (wife) (m.1938); Adam Philip, Minister General Assembly, Brother; Alexander Philip, calendar reform, cousin

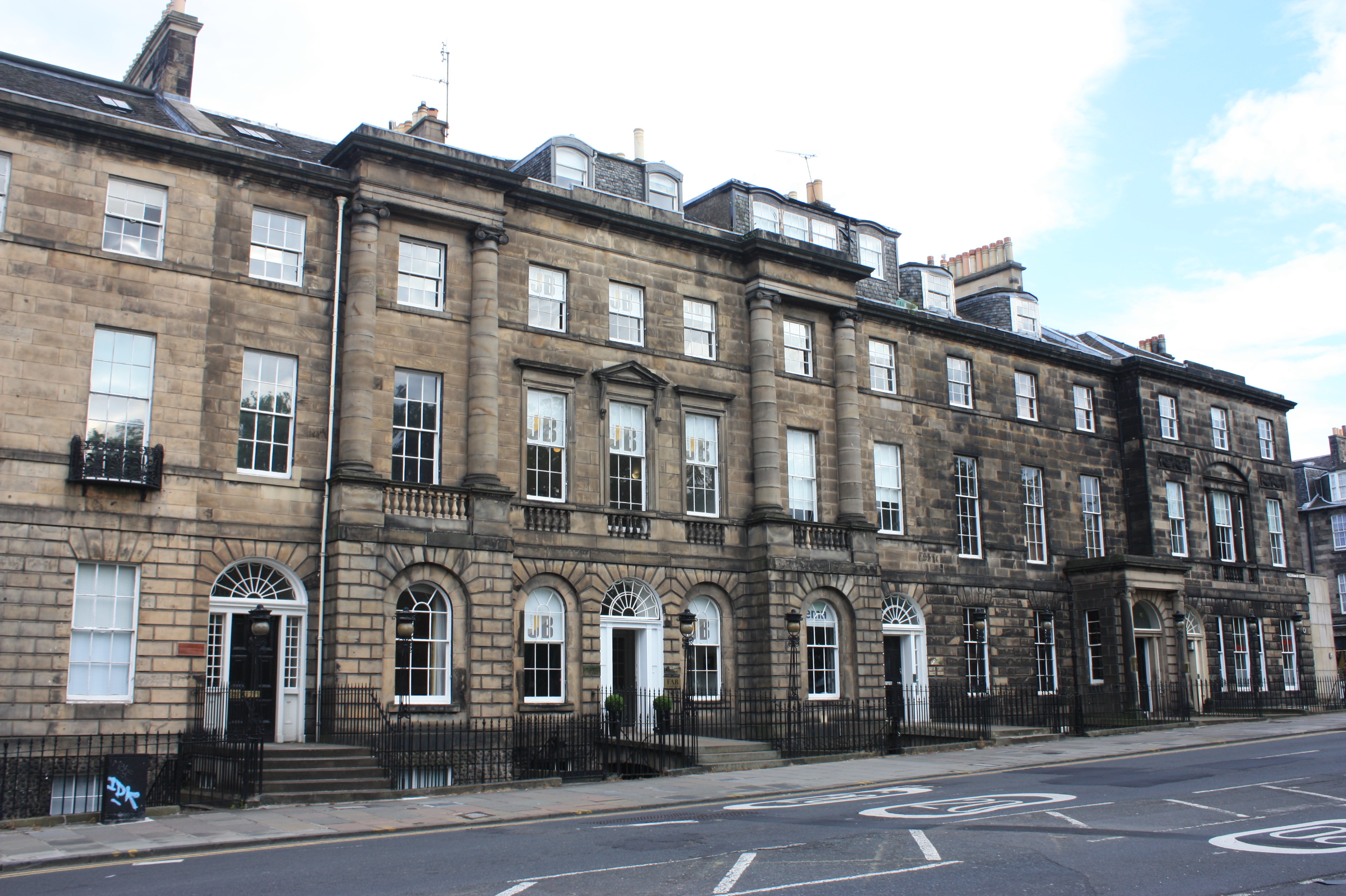
40 to 45 Charlotte Square, Edinburgh

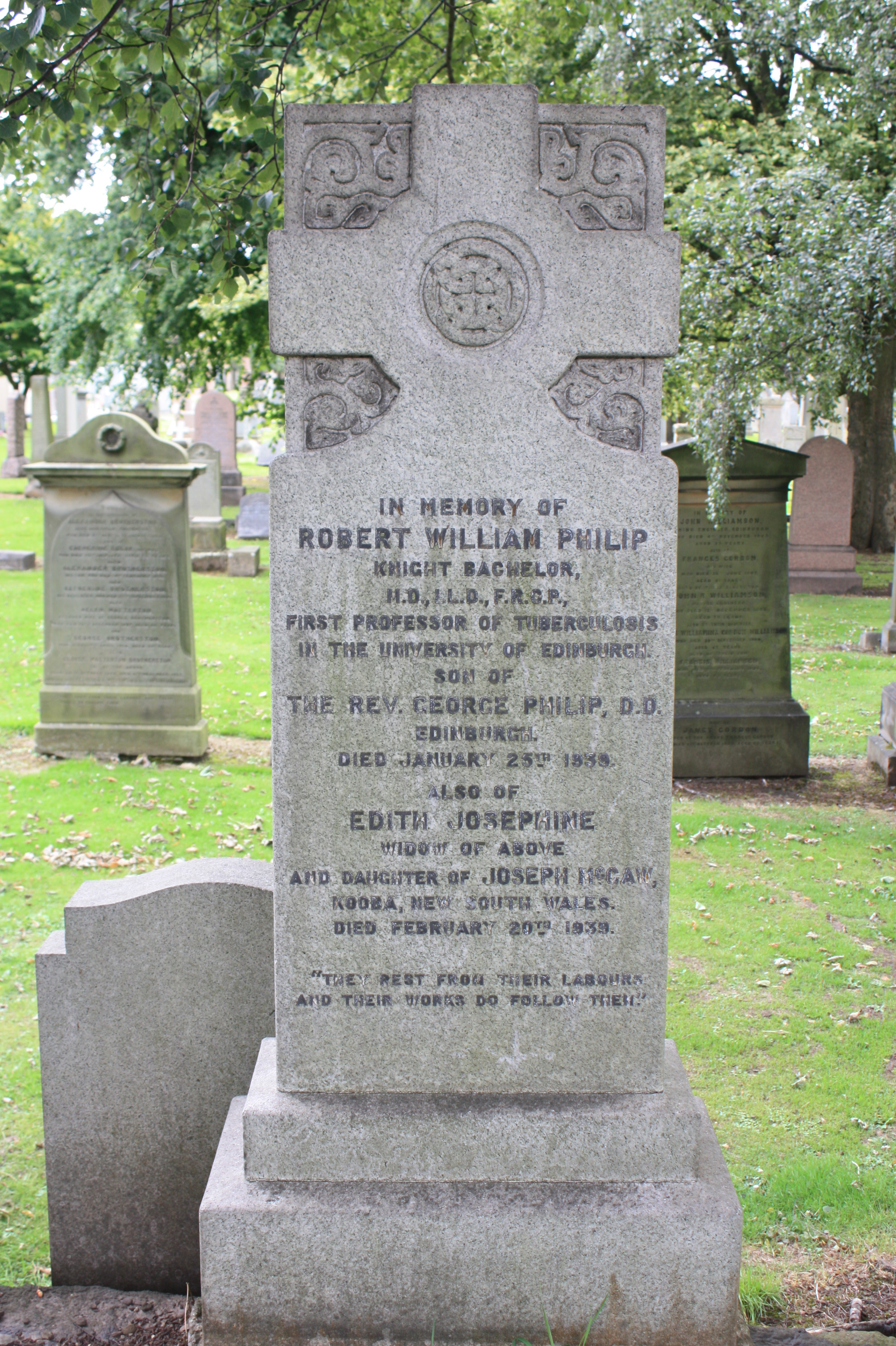
The grave of Robert William Philip, Grange Cemetery, Edinburgh

Sir Robert William Philip (29 December 1857 – 25 January 1939) was a Scottish physician and pioneer in the treatment and control of tuberculosis.

== Life ==
Philip was born in Govan on the 29 December 1857, the son of Margaret Josephine Robertson (1822–1908) and Reverend George Philip DD (1819–1904), the minister of the Free Church of Scotland in Govan. In 1866 the family relocated to Edinburgh, living at 48 Blacket Place.

He was thereafter educated at the Royal High School in Edinburgh, going on to study medicine at the University of Edinburgh, graduating with a MB CM in 1882 and receiving his doctorate (MD) in 1887. In 1889 he was elected a Fellow of the Royal Society of Edinburgh. His proposers were Sir Thomas Grainger Stewart, Sir William Turner, Robert Flint and David James Hamilton. He served as the Society's Vice President from 1927 to 1930.

He lived for much of his life at 45 Charlotte Square, one of Edinburgh's most exclusive addresses.

During World War I, he held the rank of lieutenant-colonel, Scottish Second General Hospital in the Royal Army Medical Corps.

He died in 1939 and is buried in Grange cemetery in Edinburgh. The grave lies on the main eastern path, not far from the entrance. His wife Edith Josephine McCaw is buried with him. His parents are buried nearby against the north-facing embankment.

== Family ==
In 1888 he married Elizabeth Motherwell, from County Sligo, who died on 23 April 1937 and is buried in Dean Cemetery. In 1938 he married Edith McGaw.

His older brother was the Very Rev Dr Adam Philip.

== Work on tuberculosis ==
Philip qualified to practise in 1882, the same year that Robert Koch discovered the tuberculosis bacillus. The focus of his work over the coming years was the implementation of his vision for coordinated treatment of tuberculosis. On 25 November 1887 he founded and opened the first tuberculosis dispensary clinic in Edinburgh at 13 Bank Street. In 1890 he was appointed to the honorary staff of the Royal Infirmary of Edinburgh and progressed to become a full time physician. He lectured at the extramural school, lecturing on diseases of the chest to the Edinburgh College of Medicine for Women as well as lecturing on this topic to the classes at the University of Edinburgh.

His most noteworthy student was Halliday Sutherland who continued his crusade against tuberculosis.

In 1894 he founded the Victoria Hospital for Consumption at Craigleith House, Craigleith Road, Edinburgh as a sanitorium, designed to work in conjunction with the dispensary clinic. Prior to the discovery of medication to treat tuberculosis, his focus was to isolate patients from family and friends and offer sun, fresh air and exercise.

By 1912 the integrated approach to tuberculosis treatment was recognised and adopted by the Government with the first similar clinic opening in Paddington, London.

In 1917 he became the chair in tuberculosis at University of Edinburgh. He was president of the Royal College of Physicians of Edinburgh from 1918 to 1922. In 1927 he was president of the British Medical Association.

== Honours and awards ==
In 1893 Philip was elected a member of the Harveian Society of Edinburgh and served as President in 1926. He was elected a Fellow of the Royal Society of Edinburgh in 1889. He was knighted in the 1913 New Year's Honours list. In 1920 he was elected a member of the Aesculapian Club.

In 1955 his work was recognised on a Belgium Stamp.

Academic offices
Preceded by William Russell	President of the Royal College of Physicians of Edinburgh; 1918–1923	Succeeded by George Lovell Gulland
