= Lilian Mary Grandin =

British–Jèrriais and physician and medical missionary (1876–1924)

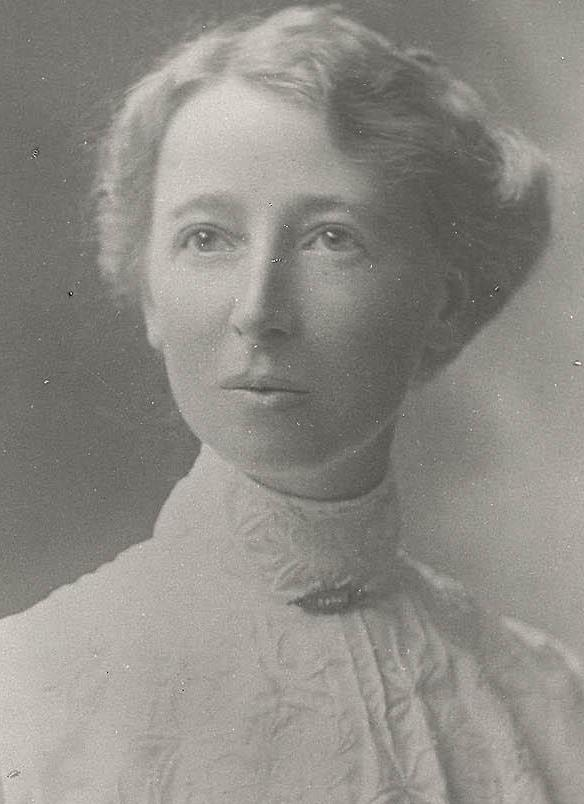
- Born: 25 November 1876; St Helier, Jersey, Channel Islands
- Died: 5 December 1924 (aged 48); Zhaotong, Republic of China
- Cause of death: typhus
- Other name: Lilian Mary Dingle
- Education: Edinburgh College of Medicine for Women, 1914
- Occupations: Physician; medical missionary
- Spouse: Edwin Dingle (m. 1912)

Lilian Mary Grandin (married name Dingle; 25 November 1876 – 5 December 1924) was a British–Jèrriais physician and Methodist medical missionary active in Zhaotong. In 1904, Grandin became the first Jerseywoman to qualify as a physician.

== Biography ==
Lilian Mary Grandin was born on 25 November 1876 in St Helier, Jersey to Francis Philip Grandin, an iron merchant, and Anne Grandin (née Benest).

Grandin was educated at Jersey Ladies' College. At twenty years old, she volunteered for the West China Mission of the United Methodist Church.

In 1899, Grandin enrolled at the Edinburgh College of Medicine for Women. Grandin also studied dentistry there, midwifery in Dublin, ophthalmology at Moorfields, and tropical diseases in London. Graduating with a Triple Qualification in 1904, Grandin became the first Jerseywoman to qualify as a physician.

== Career ==
In 1906, she and other missionaries sailed from Southampton to Shanghai, and from there by boat up the Yangtze River to Zhaotong, wrecking the boat along the way. Grandin worked for many years in Zhaotong, serving as a doctor, training Chinese midwives and nurses, and making arduous mountain trips by pony to serve aboriginal tribes. Other missionaries she worked with included Dr. Lewis Savin and Sam Pollard.

Following her marriage in 1912, Grandin left missionary work in 1913. Despite the marriage being unhappy, Grandin assisted with the publication of her husband 1918 work The new atlas and commercial gazetteer of China.

In 1923, Grandin returned to missionary work in Zhaotong but died 16 months later from typhus.

== Personal life ==
On 16 July 1912, Grandin married the journalist Edwin Dingle.

On 5 December 1924, Grandin died from typhus in Zhaotong, Republic of China (present-day China) aged 48. Grandian is buried at Fenghuang Mountain in Zhaotong.
