= Adam Philip =

Scottish minister and author

Rev. Adam Philip
- Born: 1 May 1856; Govan, Renfrewshire
- Died: 18 November 1945 (aged 89); Edinburgh, Scotland
- Occupations: Minister for Invergowrie and Moderator General Assembly
- Relatives: Sir Robert William Philip, pioneer against tuberculosis, brother; Alexander Philip, calendar reform, cousin

Adam Philip (1 May 1856 – 18 November 1945) was a Scottish minister and author, who served as Moderator of the General Assembly of the United Free Church of Scotland in 1921.

== Life ==
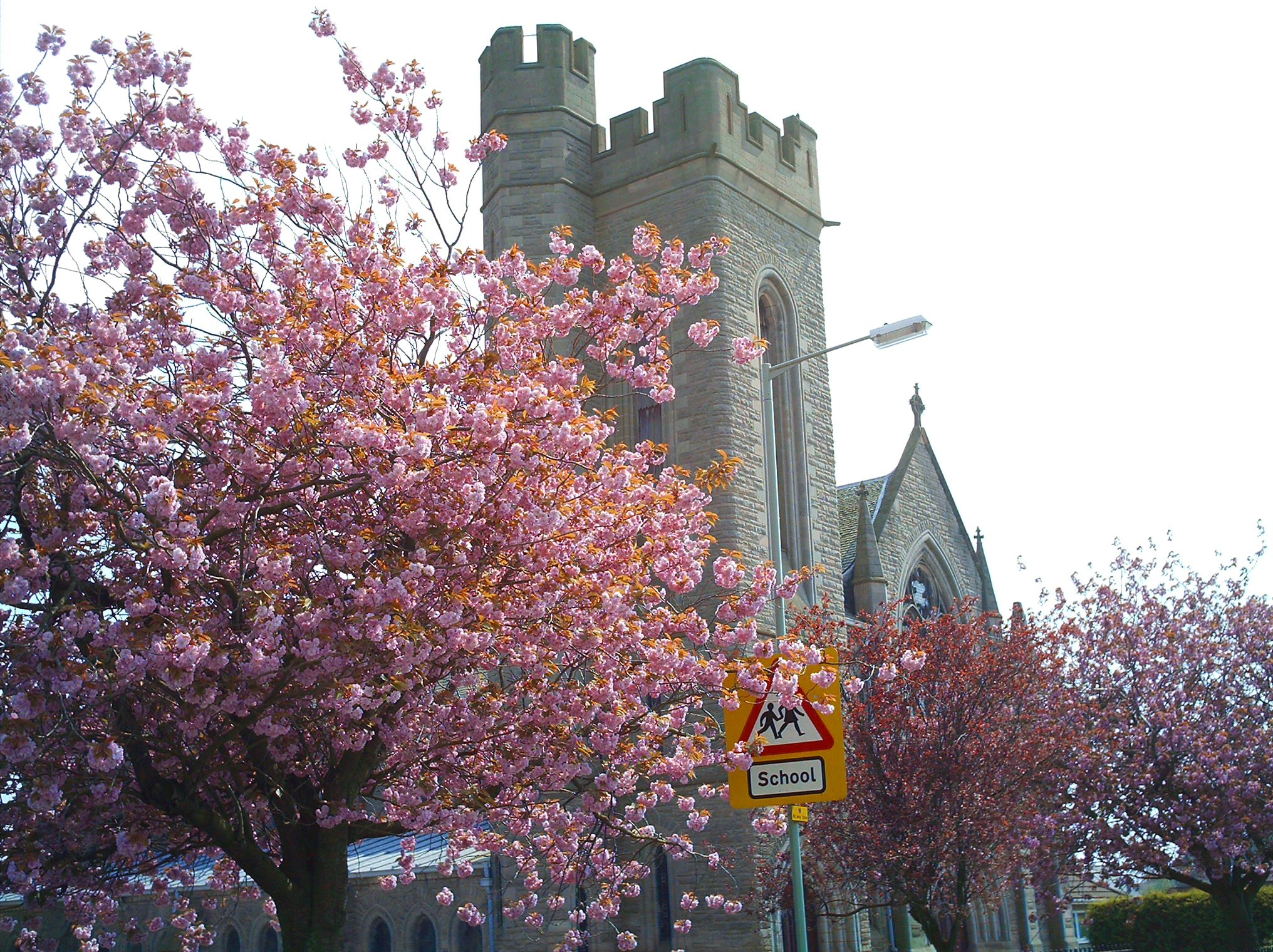
Invergowrie Church

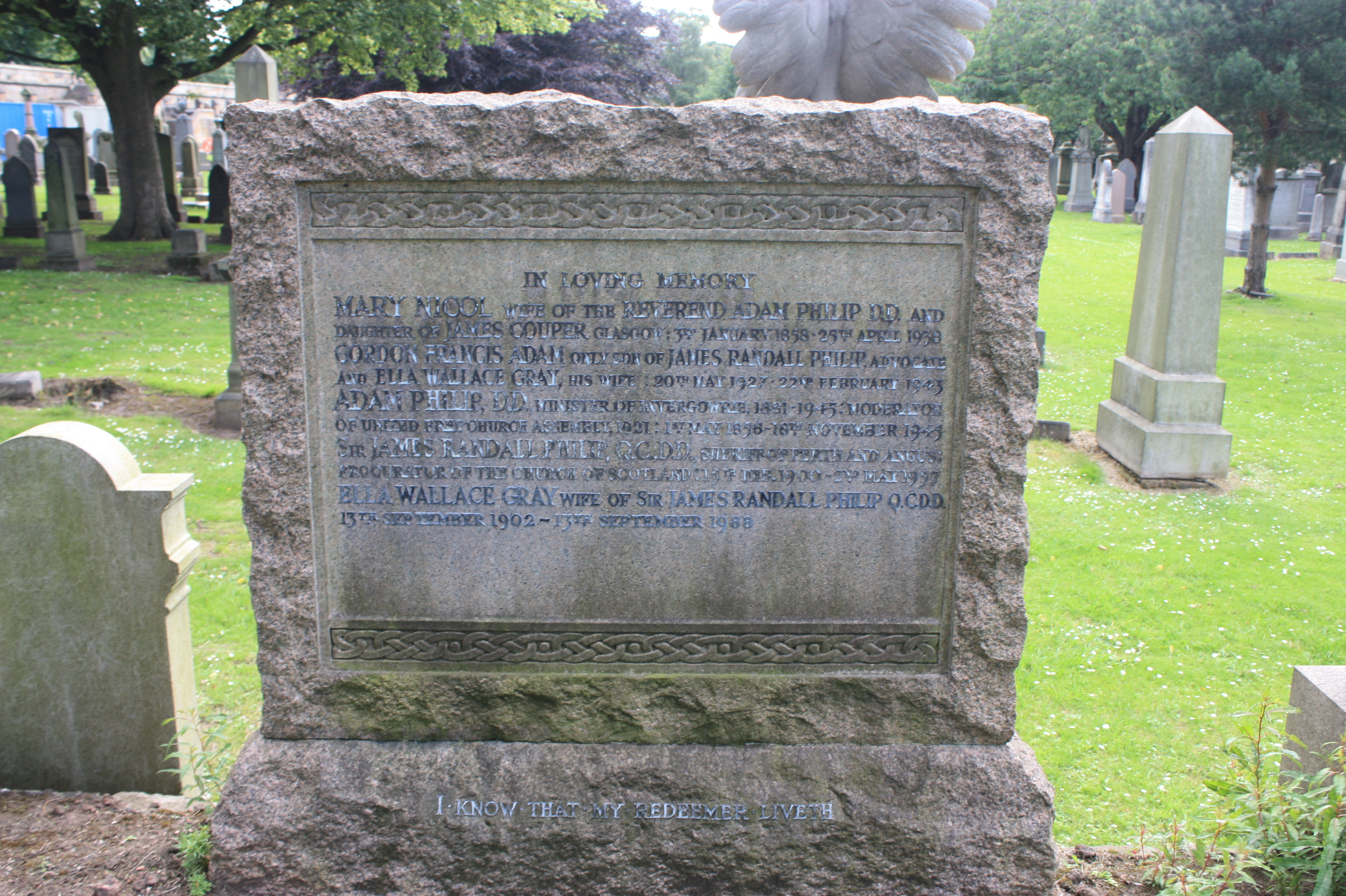
The grave of Very Rev Adam Philip, Grange Cemetery, Edinburgh

He was born on 1 May 1856 in Govan, the son of Margaret Josephine Robertson (1822-1908) and Rev George Philip DD (1819-1904). His father was latterly minister of St John's Free Church in Edinburgh.

He was minister for Invergowrie on the Firth of Tay from 1881, living in the attached manse.

He died in Edinburgh on 18 November 1945. He is buried with his family in the Grange Cemetery. The grave lies on the east path very close to the main entrance. His parents lie on the north side of the central vaults.

== Family ==
He was married to Mary Nicol Couper (1858-1938) and their children included Sir James Randall Philip QC DD (1900-1967).

His brother was the medical pioneer Robert Philip.

== Publications ==
See

- The Parish of Longforgan (1895)
- The Father’s Hand
- Songs and Sayings of Gowrie (1901)
- The Ancestry of Randall Thomas Davidson DD (1903)
- The Evangel in Gowrie (1911)
- Things Grave and Gay from Gowrie (1916)
- Paterson of Hebron the Hakim
