= Olive Smith (masseuse) =

British masseuse (1880–1916)

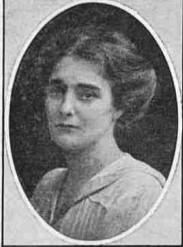
- Born: 1880
- Died: 6 October 1916 (aged 35–36); Serbia
- Resting place: Allies cemetery, Thessaloniki
- Occupations: massuese and physical instruction trainer
- Employer: Scottish Women's Hospitals for Foreign Service

Olive Smith (1880 – 5 October 1916) was a British masseuse and physical training instructor in the Scottish Women's Hospitals for Foreign Service (SWH) in Serbia during World War I. She died of malaria, within two months of volunteering with Dr Agnes Bennett's SWH unit at Ostrovo, and is buried at the Allies cemetery in Thessaloniki. She is memorialised in her home town Haltwhistle and at the teacher training college she worked at, in Glasgow.

== Family and education ==
Olive M. Smith was born in 1880 in Haltwhistle, Northumberland. She was the youngest daughter of Robert and Mary Smith, and had both brothers and sisters.

Smith was trained as a physical training instructor, firstly at Durham College of Science, Newcastle and then at Martina. Bergman Oesterberg's Physical Training College, Dartford Heath for three years, completing her professional qualifications in 1900. She became the first female gymnastic instructor in a British women's prison, as part of a government experiment, working in Glasgow's Duke Street Prison. The model was seen as successful and rolled out elsewhere.

An appreciation by an anonymous 'friend' in The Mail, and an obituary for the Bergman Osterberg Union, noted that Smith then spent a number of years training teachers in the Physical Training Department of Glasgow Provincial Centre for Teachers. She was also an all round sportsperson. Whilst working at the prison and training college in Glasgow, she lived at 30 Woodcroft Avenue, Glasgow.

== War service ==
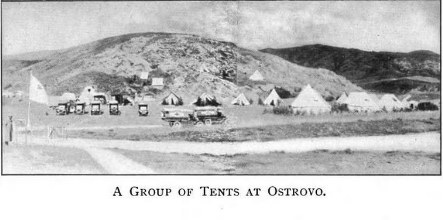
Ostrovo field hospital (tents)

At the start of World War I, Smith firstly volunteered as a masseuse at the local hospital, and then went to the Almeric Paget Centre, London to become certified by the Incorporated Society of Trained Masseuses before she joined QMAAC in a military hospital in Malta, then the Scottish Women's Hospitals for Foreign Service, in Serbia. On 3 August 1916, with Dr Agnes Bennett's unit they left Britain for Salonika.

The unit was then despatched to the (tent) field hospital in Ostrovo on 6 September, and on the first night there, there were 'star shells' being fired and bursting overhead and noise of heavy gunning began from 5am and continuing all the next day. According to SWH diarist, Ishobel Ross, they had time to climb the hill and look towards the battle that first 'moonlit' night. The ambulance transport and field hospital was fully operational on 16 September, taking in seriously wounded Serbian Army soldiers. Smith worked in the operating theatre and reception. Ishobel Ross described Smith's sudden decline and death in her last days, less than two months after joining the Unit.

== Death and memorials ==
Smith died in the night of 5 to 6 October 1916 (Note: 24 September is on her grave, as Greece used the Julian calendar) A short funeral service was held in the morning by staff in the hospital tent, and she was to be buried in Salonika, the next day.

Dr. Bennett was said to state that Smith "hold[s] an important place" in the unit, and was "highly appreciated". The SWH organising committee, in announcing her death, had said that the unit had "lost one of its most valuable members".

Smith's death was on the front page of The TImes, as quoted in The Scotsman, The Mail, and other press. Her loss was reported to the National Union of Women's Suffrage Societies in The Common Cause, and in the international suffrage newspaper, Jus Suffragii, which gave the cause of death as cerebral malaria. Her illness is mentioned in an academic paper to the 2012 International Conference on Nordic and Baltic Studies, which states that Dr Bennett attended Smith's burial at the Allies cemetery in Thessaloniki. Ishobel Ross noted what Dr. Bennett told the SWH staff about 'Smithy's' funeral: a formal guard of honour at Smith's grave, flower tributes from the Serbian Army, including a red, white and blue ribbon with 'In memory of a generous English friend who gave her life for us'. And in a eulogy, in English then Serbian, Captain Stephanovitch said that Smith had shown "unselfish devotion and pity for our pains and sufferings."

=== Memorials ===
There is an image of original wartime graves, including one for an Olive Smith, in the National Library of New Zealand.

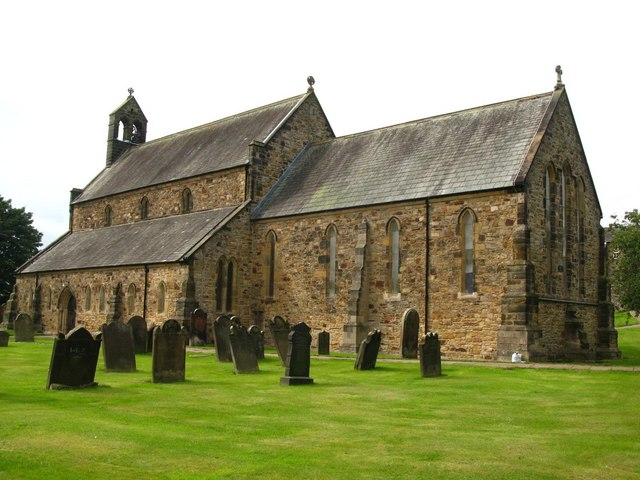
Church of the Holy Cross, Haltwhistle

Smith's Commonwealth War Graves Commission headstone (plot 1600 in Salonika (Lembet Road) Military Cemetery ) was specially engraved and refers to her date of death as 24 September (see Note above).

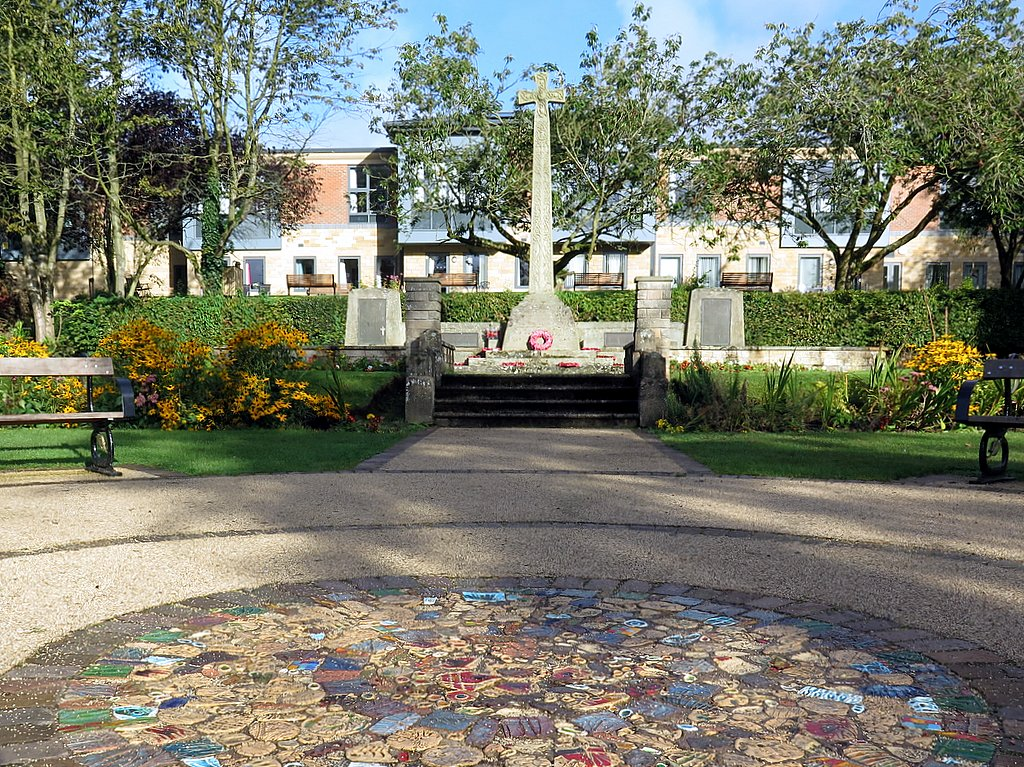
War Memorial Park, Haltwhistle

Her family installed a memorial brass plaque in the north aisle, Holy Cross Church, Eden's Lawn, Haltwhistle, paid for by her brothers and sisters, as her father had pre-deceased her. Smith is also named in the church's Book of Remembrance. And she is listed among the Roll of Honour on the Haltwhistle Memorial Cross (1926) in the Westgate, Haltwhistle.

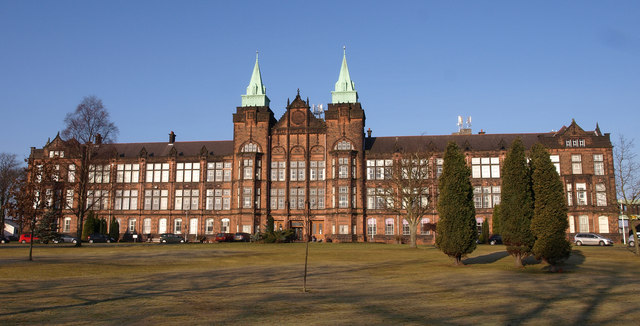
Jordanhill Campus

Smith is also included on the War Memorial (1924) at Jordanhill College David Stow Building, Southbrae Drive, Glasgow which is 'dedicated to the students and staff who fell in the Great War 1914 -18'.

The Scottish Military Research Group has a copy of the Order of Service of the memorial dedication service, and an image of the brass plaque.

In 2016, Olive Smith was listed among the thousand women who volunteered to risk of sacrifice their lives in the medical missions to Serbia in the Great War, at a memorial service, held in the Serbian Orthodox Church of St. Sava, London.

== See also ==
- Scottish Women's Hospitals for Foreign Service
- Ostrovo Unit
