= Edwin Dingle =

English journalist (1881–1972)

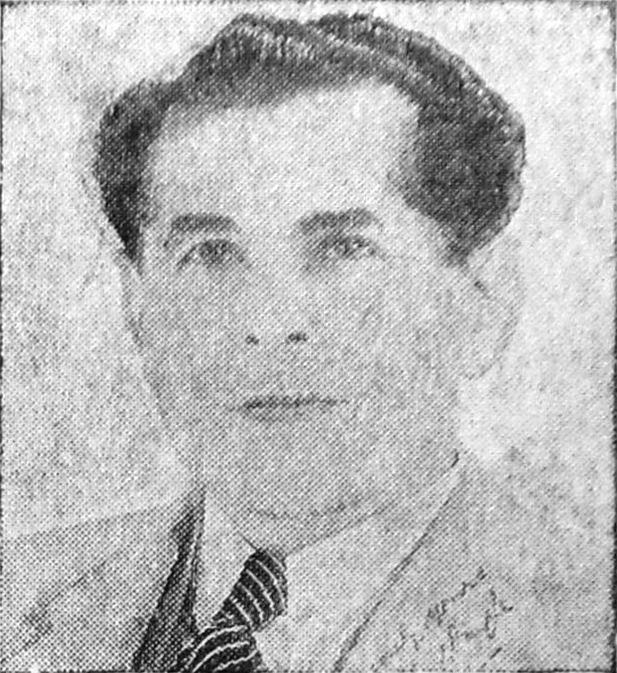
- Born: 6 April 1881; Cornwall, England
- Died: 27 January 1972 (aged 90)
- Occupations: Journalist, spiritual teacher
- Spouse: Lilian Mary Grandin (m. 1912; died 1924)

Edwin John Dingle (6 April 1881, Cornwall – 27 January 1972) was an English journalist, author and founder of the Institute of Mentalphysics in California, US. He was also a Fellow of the Royal Geographical Society of Great Britain.

Dingle claimed to have learned advanced spiritual disciplines from a Tibetan mystic, and styled himself as a spiritual teacher with the name Ding Le Mei (Chinese: 丁乐梅). As the President and Preceptor Emeritus of the Institute of Mentalphysics, he described himself as a "psychologist, author and philosopher".

== Biography ==
Edwin J. Dingle was born in Cornwall, England and became an orphan at nine. As a journalist, Dingle moved to Singapore (Straits Settlements) in 1900 to cover the affairs of the Far East. He was one of the first Caucasians to go into China and to actually stay for a substantial period of time in a Tibetan Monastery. There, he learnt meditation and yoga from a teacher.

In 1910, he travelled to Tibet and stayed there for nine months. He claimed to have learned closely guarded advanced spiritual methods from the Tibetan Lamas. These techniques included the "Eight Key Breaths", a form of pranayama. He spent nearly 21 years in the Asia, in China, India, Tibet and Burma. During the 1911 Revolution, he was in Wuhan and then Shanghai. He witnessed the brutal civil wars in Hankou and Hanyang. He later wrote a book to tell his personal experience during the revolution. He spoke highly of Li Yuanhong, Yuan Shikai and Sun Yatsen. In many ways, he sympathised with the revolution but believed that Yuan could be able to be a unifier of the country.

In 1917, the North China Daily News & Herald of Shanghai published his The New Atlas and Commercial Gazetteer of China, which was devoted to China's "geography & resources and economic & commercial development". The book served as a standard reference for years, and was described by the Millard's Review of the Far East as "The biggest and best book on the resources of China". After his return to England, Dingle also wrote about his experiences in the East which were eventually published as the book Across China on Foot by Earnshaw Books.

== Institute of Mentalphysics ==
In 1921, Dingle settled in Oakland, California and lived in retreat till 1927. In 1927, he began preaching on what he called the science of mentalphysics – a "universalist spiritual development" technique based on vegetarian diet, pranayama and development of extrasensory perception. This technique was purported as the ancient wisdom preserved by the Tibetan mystics.

Dingle's Institute of Mentalphysics was incorporated in 1933-34, and a retreat centre was established in Joshua Tree (then Yucca Valley), California, in 1941. The Institute of Mentalphysics sits on 385 acres, and most of its buildings were designed by Lloyd Wright. It is now known as the Joshua Tree Retreat Center.

Dingle also established a centre at the International Church of the Holy Trinity in Los Angeles, where he taught classes and also conducted correspondence courses on Mentalphysics across North America. As a spiritual teacher, he adopted the Chinese name "Ding Le Mei", the name given to him in the monastery of Tibet.

Following Dingle's death Donald L. Waldrop succeeded as the head of the centre

== Personal life ==
On 16 July 1912, Dingle married Lilian Mary Grandin, a British–Jèrriais physician and Methodist medical missionary. The marriage was unhappy, and in 1923 Grandin returned to missionary work in Zhaotong but died 16 months later from typhus.

Dingle died on 27 January 1972.

== Bibliography ==
- Across China on Foot: Life in the Interior and Reform Movement. New York: Henry Holt and Company, 1911.
- Dingle, Edwin John (1912). China's Revolution, 1911-1912: A Historical and Political Record of the Civil War. Bristol: Arrowsmith; New York: McBride; Shanghai: Commercial Press. OCLC 459245759. Google Books. Translated into Chinese (Beijing Zhongguo Qingnian Chubanshe: 2002) ISBN 7-5006-4688-7.
- Edwin John Dingle, K J Fruin and Norman Shaw. The new map of China. Index to the New map of China. Shanghai, Far eastern geographical establishment, 1916. OCLC 18097382.
- The new atlas and commercial gazetteer of China : a work devoted to its geography and resources and economic and commercial development. Shanghai : North China Daily News and Herald Ltd, 1918. OCLC 181722346.
- Edwin John Dingle and F L Pratt. Far eastern products manual. Shanghai, China : Far Eastern Geographical Establishment, 1921. OCLC 14994386.
- Edwin J Dingle and F L Pratt. Finance & commerce year book : China & Far East. Shanghai: 1924. OCLC 236146515. "Comprehensive financial & commercial compendium of Far Eastern Asia, devoted to all matters affecting the economic development and industrial progress of chief Asiatic markets".
- The science of mentalphysics. Los Angeles, Calif. : Institute of Mentalphysics, 1930. 49866614.
- Your mind and its mysteries : (a scientific treatise on the method of discovery and direction of the Great Subconscious). Los Angeles, Calif. : Institute of Mentalphysics, 1930. OCLC 49009100.
- Life's elixier discovered; scientifically proven regime for radiant health—beauty—youth and personal charm; the only easy way. Los Angeles, Calif., Mentalphysics [1932]. OCLC 30129800.
- Your eyes: a practical lesson for all who suffer from impaired eyesight; definite instructions and exercises. Los Angeles: The Institute of Mentalphysics, 1937. OCLC 85857318.
- Man, the monarch of the universe. [Los Angeles] : Institute of Mentalphysics, 1930. OCLC 13949063.
- Science at last finds God. Los Angeles : Institute of Mentalphysics, [1939]. OCLC 58903738.
- The art of true living. [Los Angeles] : Institute of Mentalphysics, 1937. 58903736.
- The living word: daily spiritual affirmations for every month of the year. Los Angeles : Institute of Mentalphysics, 1936. 49718104.
- Mysticism—lost key to the kingdom : inner chamber communication. Los Angeles, Calif. : Publications Dept., Institute of Mentalphysics, [194-?]. OCLC 52045406.
