= Hilda Northcroft =

New Zealand medical doctor

Hilda Margaret Northcroft (22 April 1882 – 14 June 1951) was a New Zealand medical doctor and community leader. Northcroft studied medicine at the Edinburgh College of Medicine for Women, and then trained in obstetrics in Dublin. Northcroft returned to New Zealand in 1918, and practised obstetrics in Auckland. Northcroft was the Auckland president of the Association of Medical Women, a member of the Auckland Hospital Board, and was president of the International Federation of University Women.

== Early life ==
Northcroft was born in Hamilton, Waikato, New Zealand on 22 April 1882. Her English father was a magistrate, her mother was Canadian. She attended the Auckland Grammar School and completed a year at the Auckland University College, before studying medicine at the Edinburgh College of Medicine for Women, graduating in 1908. She followed this with an LM in obstetrics at the Rotunda Hospital in Dublin in 1911.

== Career ==
Northcroft returned to New Zealand in 1918 as medical officer on the troopship Ayreshire after practising medicine in England during the war. She practised obstetrics in Auckland.

In addition to her medical practice Northcroft served on many professional bodies. She was the Auckland president of the Association of Medical Women, the Auckland secretary of the New Zealand Obstetrical and Gynaecological Society and a member of the Auckland Hospital Board from 1938 to 1947. Through the hospital board, she played a role in the establishment of the Green Lane Hospital.

In the community she was active in the National Council of Women, a member of the Auckland District Committee of the Women's War Service Committee and president of the International Federation of University Women. She was politically active in the Reform Party and then the New Zealand National Party.

Northcroft died in Green Lane Hospital, Auckland on 14 June 1951.
