= Mary De Garis =

Australian medical doctor (1881–1963)

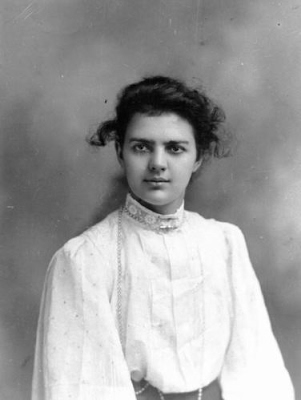
- Born: 16 December 1881
- Died: 18 November 1963 (aged 81)
- Occupation: Physician
- Medical career
- Profession: Physician

Mary Clementina De Garis (16 December 1881 – 18 November 1963) was an Australian medical doctor. During World War I she worked at the Ostrovo Unit in Serbia for the Scottish Women's Hospitals and after the war worked at Geelong Hospital in Australia. She was an advocate of antenatal and postnatal care.

== Early life and education ==
Mary Clementina De Garis was born in Charlton, Victoria in 1881. She was the daughter of a Mildura clergyman and irrigation pioneer Elisha Clement De Garis, known as Elizee De Garis, and Elizabeth Buncle, a midwife. There were six children in the family: Mary and Elizabeth (twins), Clement, (known as Jack), Lilian, Alfred, and Lucas (known as George). In 1898 Mary De Garis was dux of her year at the Methodist Ladies' College, Melbourne. In 1900 she enrolled in medicine at the University of Melbourne.

De Garis was the thirty-first woman to enroll in medicine from the University of Melbourne, awarded a Bachelor of Medicine (M.B.) in 1904 and Bachelor of Surgery (B.S.) in 1905. She was then appointed to two resident positions, at the Melbourne Hospital in 1905–06, and the Women's Hospital from 1906–07. In 1907, she became the second woman in Victoria to be awarded the Doctorate of Medicine.

== Career ==
After graduation, De Garis travelled to the Australian outback to take up her first full-time position in Muttaburra, north-west Queensland. Subsequently, in 1908–09 she travelled to the United Kingdom and to the United States of America for fourteen months to further her professional development. Returning to Melbourne, she worked at the Queen Victoria Hospital and conducted a private practice in central Melbourne. In 1911 Mary De Garis travelled to the outback town of Tibooburra, western New South Wales to work at the hospital until 1915.

=== World War I ===
Wishing to be closer to her fiancé, Colin Thomson, who had enlisted for the Australian Imperial Forces, in 1916 she sailed back to London and worked at the Manor Hospital for five months. After Colin Thomson's death at the battle of Pozieres in August 1916, she joined the Scottish Women's Hospitals organisation and was posted to the American Unit - also known as the Ostrovo Unit - in Macedonia, close to the Balkan Front, from February 1917 to October 1918. Mary De Garis was the Chief Medical Officer for 14 months.

De Garis was awarded the Serbian Order of St Sava 3rd Class.

=== Post war and death ===
After the war, in May 1919, De Garis settled in Geelong, Victoria. Here she pushed for women to be members of the hospital general committee as well as for the first maternity ward to be included in the hospital. She was also responsible for antenatal and postnatal care being implemented at the hospital. In 1931 she was appointed as the Honorary Medical Officer to the Maternity Ward at the Geelong Hospital until 1941 and then she became an Honorary Consultant to the Maternity Ward until 1959. She was the first and only female medical doctor in Geelong from 1919 to 1941. Conducting research into the causes of pain in labour and other obstetric matters, she published over 40 articles and letters in the British/Australian Medical Association journals as well as 5 books. Practising until 1960, she died in Geelong in 1963.

== See also ==
- Other notable women volunteers in the Scottish Women's Hospitals for Foreign Service
- Women in World War I
- Australian women in World War I
- The Serbian campaign (1914-1915)
