= William Russell (physician) =

Scottish pathologist and physician

- Born: 22 April 1852; Douglas, Isle of Man
- Died: 11 August 1940 (aged 88); Edinburgh, Scotland
- Education: University of Edinburgh
- Occupation: Professor of Medicine
- Years active: 1875-1919
- Known for: Description of Russell bodies Support for women in medicine
- Title: President of the Royal College of Physicians of Edinburgh
- Term: 1916-1918
- Predecessor: Alexander Hugh Freeland Barbour
- Successor: Sir Robert William Philip
- Spouse: Beatrice Ritchie (married 1873)
- Children: 6 children
- Parents: William Russell; Isabella Ross McPhail

Dr William Russell FRCPE LLD, (22 April 1852 – 11 August 1940) was a Scottish pathologist and physician who became Professor of Medicine at the University of Edinburgh and president of the Royal College of Physicians of Edinburgh. He was the first to describe the cellular inclusion particles known as Russell bodies. He was an early supporter of medical education for women.

== Early life ==
Russell was born on 22 April 1852 in Douglas, Isle of Man, the son of Isabella Ross Russell (née McPhail) and her husband, William Russell, a fishery officer, who were both originally from Caithness. When the family moved back to Caithness he went to school at Wick then to Thurso High School.

He studied medicine at the University of Edinburgh graduating with an MD in 1875. He was awarded a gold medal for his thesis. He worked as house physician at the General Hospital, Wolverhampton and as honorary physician at the Carlisle Dispensary in 1882. He was appointed lecturer on pathology at the Extramural School of Medicine, Edinburgh and in 1890, was appointed pathologist to the Royal Infirmary of Edinburgh. He then went on to pursue a career in clinical medicine as assistant physician at the Royal Infirmary in 1892, and as a full physician from 1908. In 1892 he studied with Robert Koch in Berlin. He was awarded the Cartwright Prize by the Faculty of Physicians and Surgeons of New York. The Royal College of Physicians of Edinburgh awarded him the Cullen Prize and appointed him a Gibson Lecturer.

== Medical career ==
The paper which was to bring him eponymous fame was published in 1890. In this he gave the first description of what are now known as Russell bodies. He described what he thought was 'a characteristic organism of cancer', believing it to be a fungus. These intracellular particles were accepted into the literature of pathology, but subsequent studies have revealed that these are not specific to cancer, being also found in chronic inflammatory conditions and consist largely of immunoglobulins.

He published papers on the nature of heart murmurs, and the successful treatment of pleural empyema by aspiration. He later focussed on blood pressure, exploring the role of arterial constriction and peripheral resistance in hypertension.

He was an ardent supporter of medical education for women, teaching at both the Edinburgh School of Medicine for Women and the Edinburgh College of Medicine for Women, and was one of the first physicians in the Royal Infirmary to open his wards to women students. His enthusiasm for the teaching standards of the extramural school of the Royal Colleges was such that he went so far as to describe it as 'the best training ground for professors and lecturers in the Empire'.

In 1911 he was elected a member of the Aesculapian Club. In 1911 he was living at 3 Walker Street in Edinburgh's West End.

In 1913 he was appointed the first Moncrieff Arnott professor of clinical medicine at the University of Edinburgh.

He was elected President of the Royal College of Physicians of Edinburgh in 1916, and during his presidency lobbied for the proper care of disabled soldiers. He continued to support the cause of women in medicine by allowing women to become members of the College. His friend and colleague Byrom Bramwell, who succeeded him in both the chair of medicine and as president of the RCPE described Russell, in an obituary as 'somewhat egotistical at times . . . an attractive trait, for one never knew whether or not he was laughing at himself'.

He retired from the university in 1919 being succeeded by Prof Francis Darby Boyd.

== Family and death ==
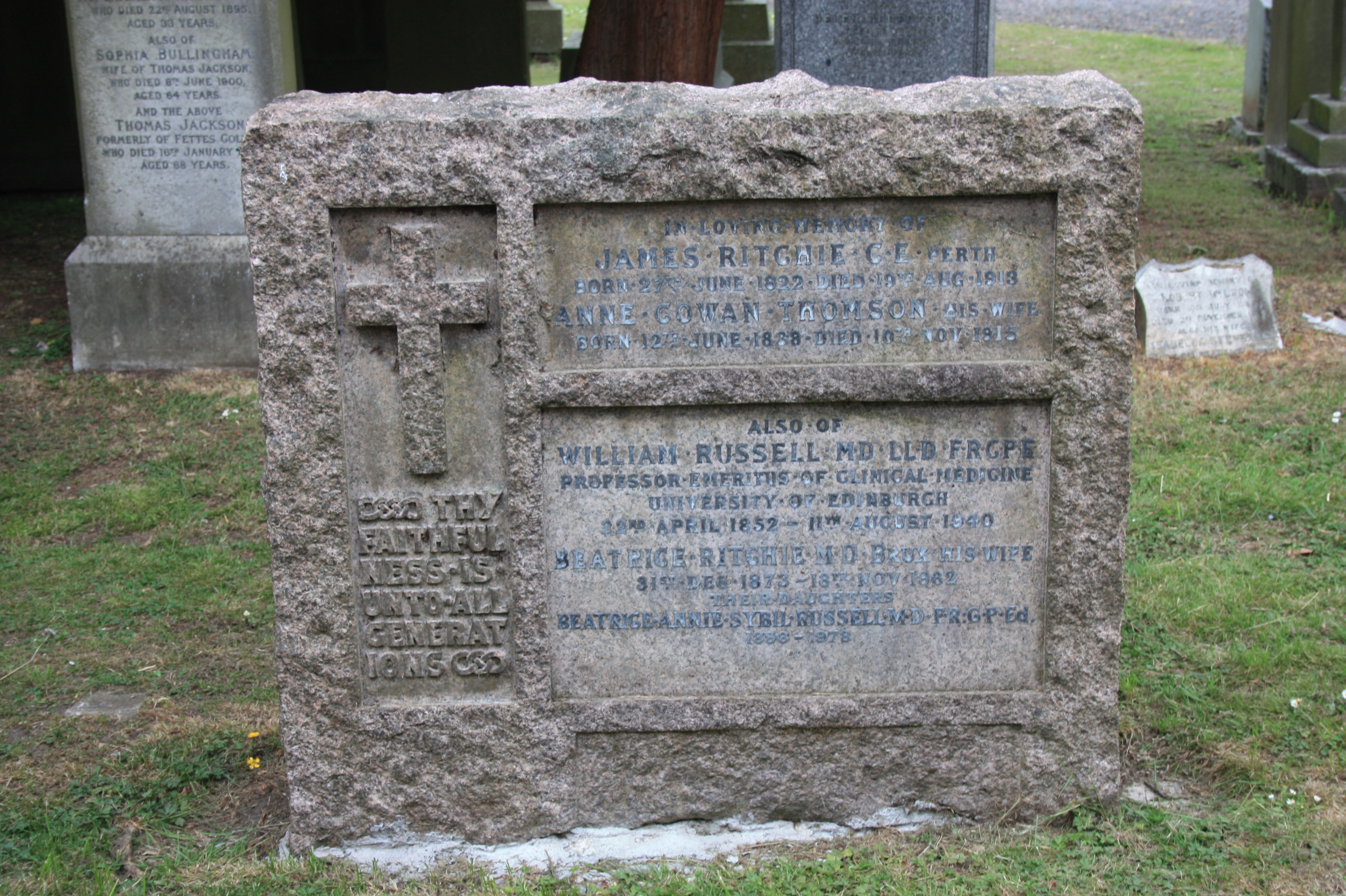
The grave of Prof William Russell in Dean Cemetery

At the age of 42, he married Beatrice Ritchie (1873-1962), aged then 21, who had been one of his pupils in the extramural school. She had attended Sophia Jex-Blake's School of Medicine for Women and qualified with the Triple Qualification of the Scottish Royal Colleges. During WW1 she worked in Edinburgh for the Scottish Women's Hospitals, which had been founded by her fellow student Elsie Inglis. In 1925 she helped found the Elsie Inglis Memorial Maternity Hospital.

Of their six children four became doctors. Their infant son Ivan died of tuberculosis during the epidemic of tuberculous mastitis which had a particularly high incidence in Edinburgh. Their third daughter emigrated to Russia.

Russell died in Edinburgh on 11 August 1940. He is buried in the grave of his father-in-law, James Ritchie (1828-1913) in Dean Cemetery. The grave lies near the south path of the Victorian north extension and was restored in the winter of 2017/18.

Academic offices
Preceded by Alexander Hugh Freeland Barbour	President of the Royal College of Physicians of Edinburgh; 1916-1918	Succeeded by Sir Robert William Philip
