= Edinburgh College of Medicine for Women =

The Edinburgh College of Medicine for Women
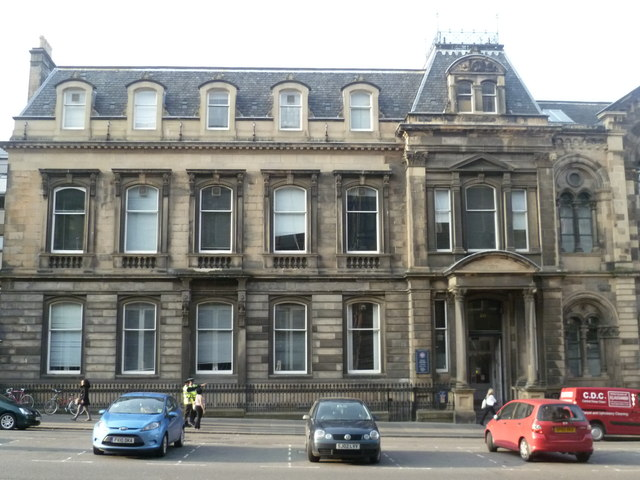
- Minto House, 20 Chambers Street, Edinburgh, location of the college from 1896 to 1908.
- Active: 1889–1908
- Parent institution: Scottish Association for the Medical Education of Women

The Edinburgh College of Medicine for Women was established by The Scottish Association for the Medical Education of Women whose leading members included John Inglis, the father of Elsie Inglis. Elsie Inglis went on to become a leader in the suffrage movement and found the Scottish Women's Hospital organisation in World War I, but when the college was founded she was still a medical student. Her father, John Inglis, had been a senior civil servant in India, where he had championed the cause of education for women. On his return to Edinburgh he became a supporter of medical education for women and used his influence to help establish the college. The college was founded in 1889 at a time when women were not admitted to university medical schools in the UK, with the sole exception of London University.

== Origins ==
The college was set up as a result of a dispute within the Edinburgh School of Medicine for Women. This had been established in 1886 by Sophia Jex-Blake, who was regarded by many of her students as a strict disciplinarian. When two students, Grace Cadell and her sister Martha, were dismissed in 1888 for a breach of rules, they successfully sued Jex-Blake and the school. Another student, Elsie Inglis, emerged as the leader of a group of students sympathetic to the Cadell sisters and increasingly hostile to Jex-Blake. John Inglis her father had a circle of influential friends, including the Principal of the University of Edinburgh, Sir William Muir. They set up the Scottish Association for the Medical Education of Women, which soon had an impressive list of supporters and financial backers. The first president was Sir Alexander Christison, who was striving to reverse the anti-female stance of his father Prof Robert Christison.

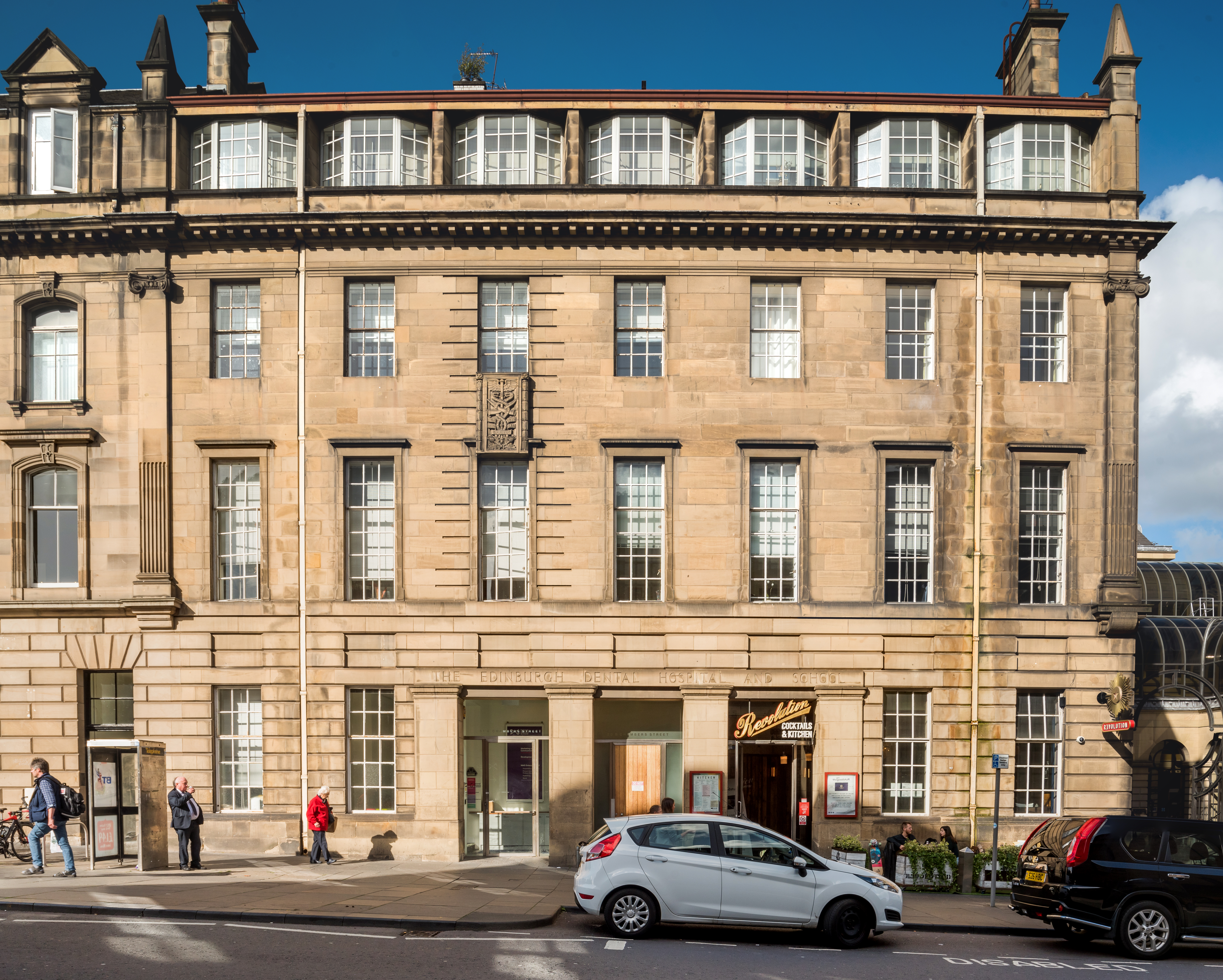
Site of the subsequent location of the college at 30 Chambers Street from 1908. The building shown became the Edinburgh Dental Hospital, which replaced the earlier building which had housed the college.

The college opened in 1889. The Association initially rented rooms at 30 Chambers Street and in 1896 moved a few doors down to premises at Minto House, 20 Chambers Street, which had been the location of another private medical school and so was well suited to the needs of the college with lecture rooms and laboratories.

== College activities ==
The college was set up in direct competition to Jex-Blake's Edinburgh School of Medicine for Women, which was to close in 1898. It aimed to prepare the women students for the examinations of the Triple Qualification (TQ) offered by the Scottish medical Royal Colleges. Successful candidates were able to register with the General Medical Council and practice medicine in Britain, throughout much of the then British Empire and in some states of the United States of America. When the Scottish universities allowed women to graduate in medicine, many of the college's graduates were awarded the university degrees of MB, CM until 1899 or MB, ChB thereafter.

In the first session the college had 18 lecturers whose lectures covered the syllabus of subjects required by the TQ. The TQ also required a series of clinical placements in a variety of specialities in approved hospitals. The main teaching hospital, the Royal Infirmary of Edinburgh, refused to allow women medical students on its wards. Jex-Blake's School of Medicine had arranged clinical teaching at a smaller teaching hospital Leith Hospital, and its wards were therefore not available to the college. The college arranged for its clinical teaching at Glasgow Royal Infirmary where two surgeons, Sir William Macewen and James Hogarth Pringle were ardent supporters of medical education for women.

There was still much opposition to medical education for women and much of the success of the college resulted from the influential supporters of the Scottish Association for the Medical Education of Women. These included the Association's first president Sir Alexander Christison Bt, who ironically was the son of Sir Robert Christison who had been a leading opponent of medical education for women. Among the first Vice Presidents were Dr Robert Craig Maclagan and Sir Robert Philip the pioneer of tuberculosis treatment.

In July 1892 the college had sufficient funds and sufficient influence to have two wards in the Royal Infirmary of Edinburgh opened to the women medical students of the college at a cost of £700. The students were initially taught in the medical ward by Dr William Russell and Dr (later Sir) Byrom Bramwell and in the surgical ward by Mr (later Professor Sir) Joseph M Cotteril.

The college closed in 1908 when its 20 Chambers Street buildings were sold. Thereafter the women students were taught in the School of Medicine of the Royal Colleges of Edinburgh until 1916.

== Early lecturers ==
At the time of the college's foundation there was still opposition to medical education for women. By choosing to lecture at the college the lecturers were effectively making public their support for women in medicine. Most were young men several of whom would become well known in later life. The first lecturers included:

- John W Ballantyne (Midwifery and gynaecology) who made significant contributions to improving antenatal and perinatal care, publishing over 500 papers and books on obstetrical topics.
- William Craig FRSE, FRCSEd (Therapeutics) became better known as a botanist in later life.
- James Hodsdon FRCSEd (Surgery) who went on to be knighted and elected president of the Royal College of Surgeons of Edinburgh.
- William Keiller (Anatomy), who from 1891 became Professor of Anatomy at the University of Texas at Galveston.
- Harvey Littlejohn FRCSEd (Public Health) who became professor of Forensic Medicine at the University of Edinburgh and as an expert on medical jurisprudence became an expert witness at celebrated criminal trials.
- William Ivison Macadam FRSE, FIC (Chemistry) who continued chemistry research and teaching in the extramural school, supporting the cause of women's education until his tragic murder in his laboratory in 1912.
- Robert Philip FRSE, FRCP (Medicine) who became a pioneer in the treatment of tuberculosis and went on to become president of the Royal College of Physicians of Edinburgh and president of the British Medical Association. He was knighted for services to medicine.
- William Russell FRCPE (Pathology) who became Professor of Medicine at the University of Edinburgh and president of the Royal College of Physicians of Edinburgh. He was the first to describe the cellular inclusion particles known as Russell bodies.

== Notable students ==
- Agnes Bennett OBE (1872–1960), Australian–New Zealander physician
- Harriet Amelia Scott Bird 1864–1934), surgeon
- Mary Booth OBE (1869–1956), Australian physician, clubwoman and philanthropist
- Grace Cadell (1855–1918), physician and suffragist
- Kadambini Ganguly (1861–1923), Indian physician
- Lilian Mary Grandin (1876–1924), British–Jèrriais physician and medical missionary
- Kate Welton Hogg (1869–1951) Australian physician
- Elsie Inglis (1864–1917), physician, surgeon, educator and suffragist
- Caroline Matthews (1877–1927) physician and war correspondent
- Meher Naoroji (1881–1974), Indian physician and the first Indian woman to graduate with a medical degree from the University of Edinburgh.
- Hilda Margaret Northcroft (1882–1951), New Zealander physician and community leader.
- Mabel L. Ramsay (1878–1954), physician and suffragist
- Eleanor Sproull (1867–1958), Irish physician and nun
- Mona Chalmers Watson CBE (1872–1936) physician and head of the Women's Army Auxiliary Corps.
- Mary Broadfoot Walker (1888–1974), physician
