= Eleanor Sproull =

Irish physician and nun (1867–1958)

- Born: Eleanor Rosina Sproull; 22 September 1867; Carrickfergus, County Antrim, Ireland
- Died: October 1958 (aged 91); Staines-upon-Thames, Middlesex, UK
- Education: Edinburgh College of Medicine for Women, 1900, MD ChB; University of Edinburgh Medical School, 1908, MD
- Occupation: Physician

Eleanor Rosina Sproull (22 September 1867 – October 1958) was an Irish physician and later nun of the Sisters of Mercy. Sproull was one of the first female physicians of the Victorian era.

== Early life and education ==
Sproull was born on 22 September 1867 in the Scotch Quarter of Carrickfergus, County Antrim to William Henry Sproull, a solicitor, and Jane Sproull (née Berney). One of 15 siblings, Sproull was raised in the Church of Ireland.

Initially studying at the Royal University of Ireland in Belfast, Sproull enrolled at the Edinburgh College of Medicine for Women in 1895. Graduating with her MD ChB in 1900, Sproull later enrolled at the University of Edinburgh. Sproull graduated with her MD in 1908, with a thesis entitled Infantile mortality. A short account of preventive measures in six Yorkshire towns: a general discussion of its causes and best means of prevention..

== Career ==
Sproull worked as a school medical officer in Bromley during 1909 to 1911, and in Castleford from 1912 to 1921. During this period Sproull suffered from bouts of depression, and in her letters to former classmate Agnes Bennett she detailed her feelings of isolation. Sproull's letters to Bennett also her reflect her deeply felt spirituality, and in a 1910 letter she laments that ‘‘I have not yet found the man clerical who when he begins to talk to a woman on such subjects doesn't ... talk down to her’’.

From 1922 to 1933, Sproull lived at the House of Mercy in Horbury. In 1934, Sproull relocated to Laleham Abbey and was registered as a nun of the Sisters of Mercy in the 1939 register.

== Personal life ==
Sproull was a close friend of her former classmate Agnes Bennett, with whom she wrote monthly letters.

In October 1958, Sproull died in Staines-upon-Thames, Middlesex (present-day Surrey) aged 91, and was buried at All Saints' Church Laleham on 4 November 1958.
