= William Craig (botanist) =

Scottish surgeon and botanist (1832–1922)

Dr William Craig FRSE FRCSE (28 March 1832 – 3 February 1922) was a Scottish surgeon and botanist. He was an expert on jaborandi, an appetite suppressant. His collections and studies were largely focussed upon Perthshire in central Scotland.

== Life ==
He was born in Avondale, South Lanarkshire on 28 March 1832 the son of John Craig, a farmer at High Ploughland.

He originally studied arts and divinity at the University of Glasgow, then in later life studied medicine and more pharmaceutical type subjects, graduating MB CM at the University of Edinburgh in 1868. He qualified as a doctor (MD) in 1870.

He lectured on Materia Medica and Therapeutics at the Edinburgh College of Medicine for Women on Chambers Street, Edinburgh and at the Extra-Mural Medical School at Surgeon's Hall. In 1874 he was elected a member of the Harveian Society of Edinburgh.

In 1875 he was elected a Fellow of the Royal Society of Edinburgh. His proposers were John Hutton Balfour, Sir Andrew Douglas Maclagan, Alexander Dickson and Thomas Alexander Goldie Balfour. He served as president of the Edinburgh Botanical Society in 1887–89.

In 1878 he was made a fellow of the Royal College of Surgeons of Edinburgh.

He died at home, 71 Bruntsfield Place in south-west Edinburgh, on 3 February 1922, aged 89.

== Publications ==
See

- Notes on Jaborandi (Oliver & Boyd 1876)
- Changed Aloin and the Resin of Aloes (1875)
- Plant Ecology and Diversity: Notes on the Drug called Jaborandi (1875)
