= Mary Booth (physician) =

Australian physician and philanthropist (1869–1956)

Mary Booth OBE
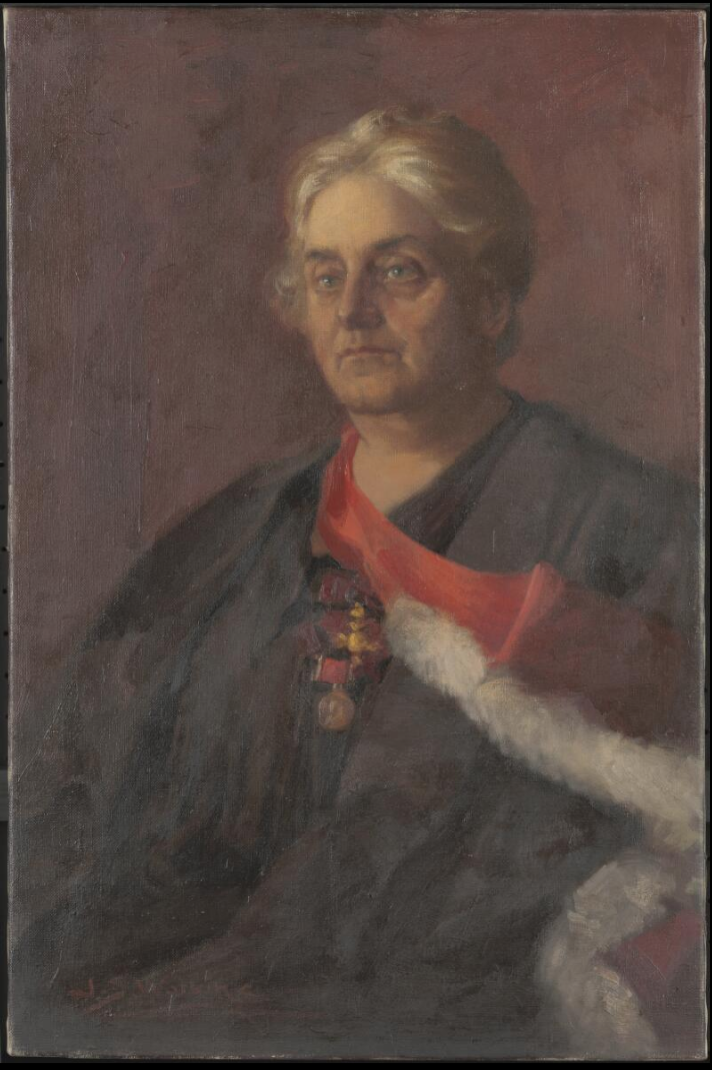
- Dr Mary Booth, OBE, by J.S. Watkins (c.1930)
- Born: 9 July 1869; Burwood, Sydney
- Died: 28 November 1956 (aged 87); Sydney, New South Wales
- Education: University of Sydney, 1890; Edinburgh College of Medicine for Women,1899
- Occupations: Physician; clubwoman; philanthropist
- Political party: Women's Party (1920)

Mary Booth OBE (1869–1956) was an Australian physician, clubwoman and philanthropist.

== Early life and education ==
Mary Booth was born on 9 July 1869 at Burwood, Sydney. She was the eldest of three daughters of Ruth Sewell, and William Booth. Booth educated in private, at Airlie School and then graduated Bachelor of Arts (B.A.) from the University of Sydney on 14 April 1890.

She supported herself by working as a governess for the children of the New South Wales governor, Victor Child Villiers, 7th Earl of Jersey, until 1893 when she received inheritance from her grandfather Thomas Sewell. She studied medicine at the Edinburgh College of Medicine for Women (graduating in 1899) before returning to Sydney in 1900.

== Career ==
Booth kept medical consulting rooms on Macquarie street, primarily working contracts in public health. She taught at girls' secondary schools and worked as a lecturer for the NSW Department of Public Instruction. In 1910-12 she established the Victorian school for medical service.

Booth was active in feminist organisations, she was a founder of the Women's Club, and she held roles on the National Council of Women of New South Wales.

During the Great War, Booth became an active campaigner for conscription, taking a role on the executive committee of the Universal Service League. She offered her services to supervise refugee camps in Egypt, but was turned down. Instead she remained in Australia and established supportive charity organisations such as the Babies' Kit Society for the Allies Babies, which collected babies clothes for refugees. Booth was the office bearer and founder of many patriotic associations, including the Friendly Union of Soldiers' Wives and the Soldier's Club. She founded the Soldier's Club at the Royal Hotel on George Street, when she identified the problem of homeless soldiers. She also set up a centre for Soldiers Wives and Mothers, and established a War Widows Fund. For establishing the Soldier's club, and the Friendly Union of Soldiers' Wives she was honored with an OBE.

Booth stood unsuccessfully for North Shore as an Independent candidate in 1920. She then failed to gain the nomination in 1922 for the Senate election. She published a monthly magazine Boy Settler; founded the Anzac Fellowship of Women in 1921; and involved in the Dreadnought Scheme.

== Awards and honours ==
Booth was awarded an OBE in 1918 for her charitable work.

== Death and legacy ==
Booth died in 1956. After her death and the sale of her property, the funds were used to initiate the scholarship for women economic students at the University of Sydney. In 1961 the Mary Booth Lookout in Kirribilli was named in her honour. Booth Crescent, in the Canberra suburb of Cook, is named for her.
