= Charlotte Carmichael Stopes =

British scholar, author, and women's rights advocate (1840–1929)

- Born: Charlotte Brown Carmichael; 5 February 1840; Edinburgh, Scotland
- Died: 6 February 1929; Worthing, Sussex, England
- Known for: Shakespeare scholarship, and Women's rights
- Spouse: Henry Stopes
- Children: Marie Stopes, Winifred Stopes

Charlotte Brown Carmichael Stopes (née Carmichael; 5 February 1840 – 6 February 1929), also known as C. C. Stopes, was a British scholar, author, and campaigner for women's rights. She also published several books relating to the life and work of William Shakespeare. Her most successful publication was British Freewomen: Their Historical Privilege (published 1894), a book which influenced and inspired the early twentieth century British women's suffrage movement. She married Henry Stopes, a palaeontologist, brewer and engineer. They produced two daughters, the eldest of whom was Marie Stopes, known for her advocacy of birth control.

== Early life ==
Charlotte Stopes was born in Edinburgh on 5 February 1840 to Christine Brown Graham Carmichael and James Ferrier Carmichael, a landscape painter, who died of tuberculosis when Stopes was fourteen. She had the desire to become a writer, devising stories for her brothers and sisters when she was a child and at twenty-one publishing a collection, Alice Errol and Other Tales. On completing the only schooling a young woman could then receive, she took posts as a governess, one of the few careers available to her, throughout the 1860s and early 1870s.

== University education ==
In 1865 Sarah Mair founded the Ladies' Edinburgh Debating Society, which published a regular writing journal, The Attempt. Charlotte Carmichael had become a member by 1866 and published sundry pieces in The Attempt. In a meeting of the society in 1867 Mary Crudelius presented her initiative of creating classes for women at a university level under the auspices of the Edinburgh Ladies' Educational Association. Charlotte Carmichael was present at the meeting. She pledged her willingness to attend such classes and guaranteed another twelve interested persons. The first classes began in 1868, taught by Professor David Masson, professor of English literature at Edinburgh University, "at a time when the University was not open to women and courses were given to them privately by the male Professors". Although women were not permitted to take a degree, she achieved the highest certificate then available to a female student, in subjects as diverse as literature, philosophy and science, achieving first class honours. In fact, she "was the first woman in Scotland to gain a Certificate of Arts". She used her education for the advancement of women and pursued scholarly interests in English Renaissance, particularly Shakespearean, literary history.

In 1876 Stopes went to Glasgow to help the movement for women's higher education in that city. The trip coincided with a meeting of the British Association for the Advancement of Science, which she attended, beginning her long connection with the association. It was at the Glasgow meeting that she met Henry Stopes, who, despite his being eleven years the younger, she would marry three years later.

== Upper Norwood ==
After they were married on 3 June 1879, the Stopeses went on a honeymoon across Europe and the Near East, eventually visiting Egypt, before returning to Britain. Charlotte Stopes went to Edinburgh where her first daughter, Marie, was born in 1880. After reaching her husband in Colchester, his family home, they moved to London, where he had an active business. They settled in Upper Norwood on the southern outskirts of the city, where her second daughter, Winnie, was born in 1884. Henry, being very busy with business, left Charlotte alone in their new house, where she was isolated from the sorts of intellectual life she had been used to. Her response was to organize meetings and classes, including a reading group, a logic workshop and a group focused on issues relating to women's emancipation.

Stopes became keenly interested in the Victorian dress reform and the need for comfortable clothes for women. She was a member of the Rational Dress Society and her activity with the society in 1888–1889 gave rise to her identity as a feminist. At a meeting of the British Association for the Advancement of Science in Newcastle upon Tyne in 1889, Stopes stunned the proceedings by organizing an impromptu session where she introduced rational dress to a wide audience, her speech being noted in newspapers across Britain.

Stopes remained in Norwood until her husband's bankruptcy in 1892, when they were forced to sell the house. To escape the disaster, she took her daughters to Edinburgh, where she enrolled them at the newly formed girls' school, St George's School, Edinburgh. She also attempted to gain a retrospective degree, denied to her at the time of her studies, but she needed a further two courses not included in her certificate. These courses however clashed, so she could not do them in a single year and she abandoned the attempt, returning to London to take up lodgings in Torrington Square close to the British Museum, where she was able to better follow her Shakespearean research.

== Activism ==
C. C. Stopes's study of British women's history proved to be the most popular and influential of her numerous publications. British Freewomen: Their Historical Privilege was published by Swan Sonnenschein in 1894. (The Sonnenschein Archives are at the University of Reading.) It ran to several editions and was a key reference point for the British female suffrage movement. Helen Blackburn, who had supplied Stopes with notes from her own research to help the enterprise, purchased the whole first edition, many copies of which were sent copies to members of the House of Commons. Laura E Nym Mayhall observes that British Freewomen was 'perhaps the single most influential text in casting women's struggle for the vote within the radical narrative of loss, resistance and recovery' since Stopes's arguments, as outlined in successive editions of British Freewomen, were frequently cited by 'suffragists of all stripes in making the case for women's suffrage in print, before crowds, and in the courtroom'. Stopes was a member of the National Union of Women's Suffrage Societies. She wrote pamphlets and spoke publicly in campaigns for women's rights.

== Shakespearean scholarship ==
Her first book was The Bacon/Shakespeare Question, published in 1888: refuting the popular speculation that Francis Bacon was the actual author of Shakespeare's plays. This was the first of several works of scholarship concerning Shakespeare and literature of his period. Her books in the field included Shakespeare's Family (1901), Shakespeare's Warwickshire Contemporaries (1907), William Hunnis and the Revels (1910), Burbage and Shakespeare's Stage (1913), The Seventeenth-Century Accounts of the Masters of the Revels (1922) and many published notes and articles. Stopes received the Rose Mary Crawshay Prize from the British Academy in 1916 for her Shakespearian research, thirteen years before her death in February 1929.

According to Boas, on the day after Stopes died, The Times published the following comment:

The Royal Society of Literature has lost a distinguished veteran among its Fellows, and the study of Shakespeare a brave and devoted servant.

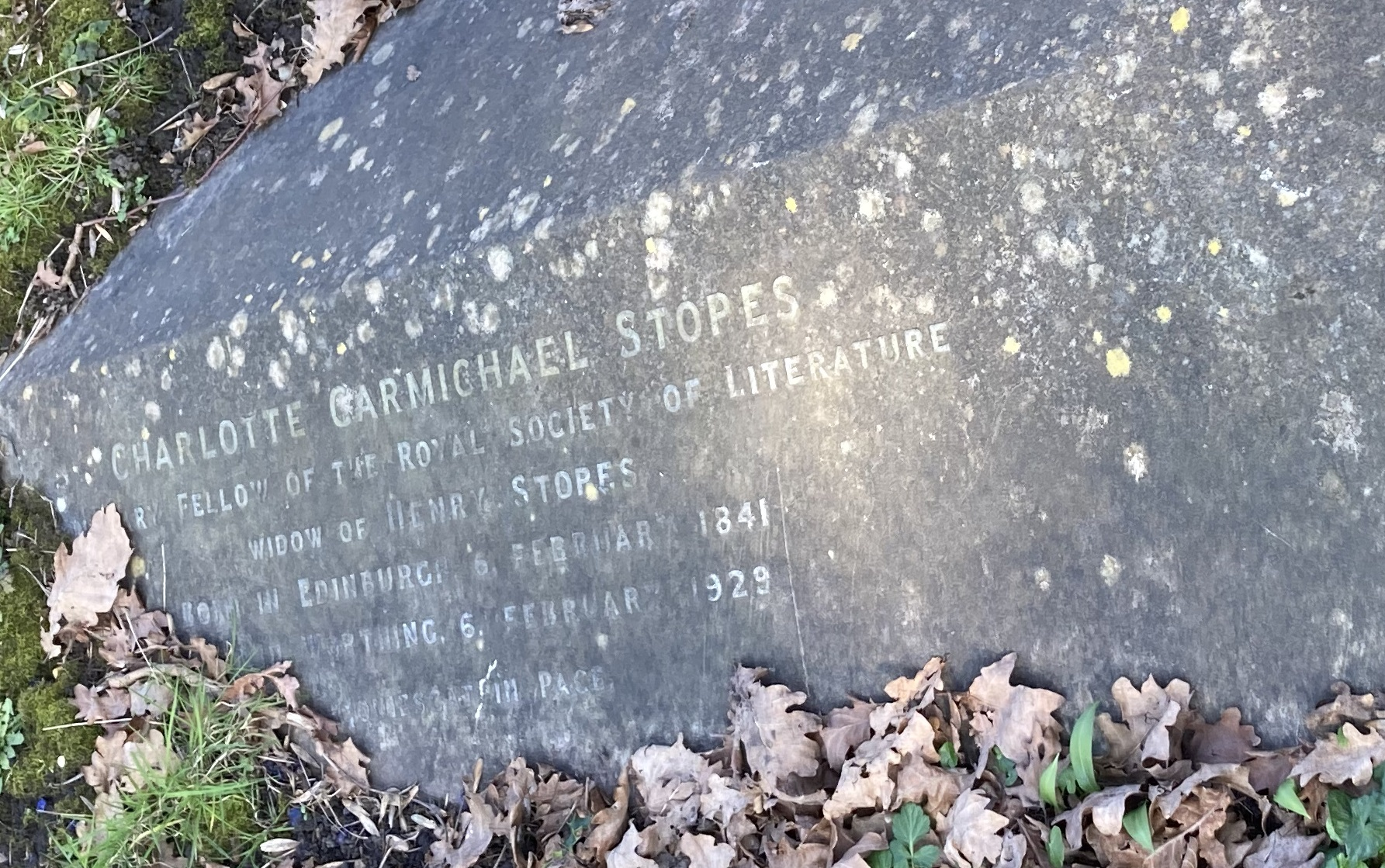
Grave of Charlotte Carmichael Stokes in Highgate Cemetery (east side)

== Later life ==
For much of her later life Stopes had financial difficulties after her husband's bankruptcy (1892) and untimely death (1902). Though daughter Marie became independent when she won a scholarship and later was given a university position, Stopes still had a younger daughter, Winnie, to care for. Her financial difficulties were partly alleviated at the end of 1903 when she was awarded a government pension of £50 a year "in consideration of her literary work, especially in connection with the Elizabethan period". She was awarded another grant in 1907 by the Carnegie Trust, this time for £75 a year.

As a Shakespearean scholar her recognition continued to increase and in 1912 she was elected as an honorary member of the Royal Society of Literature. In 1914 she became the founding member of a new Shakespeare Association which promoted Shakespearean scholarship through functions and lectures until 1922.

Charlotte Stopes died on 6 February 1929 in Worthing, Sussex at the age of 89, from bronchitis and cerebral thrombosis, and was buried at Highgate Cemetery. The date of birth on her grave is 6 February 1841.

== Works by Charlotte Carmichael Stopes ==
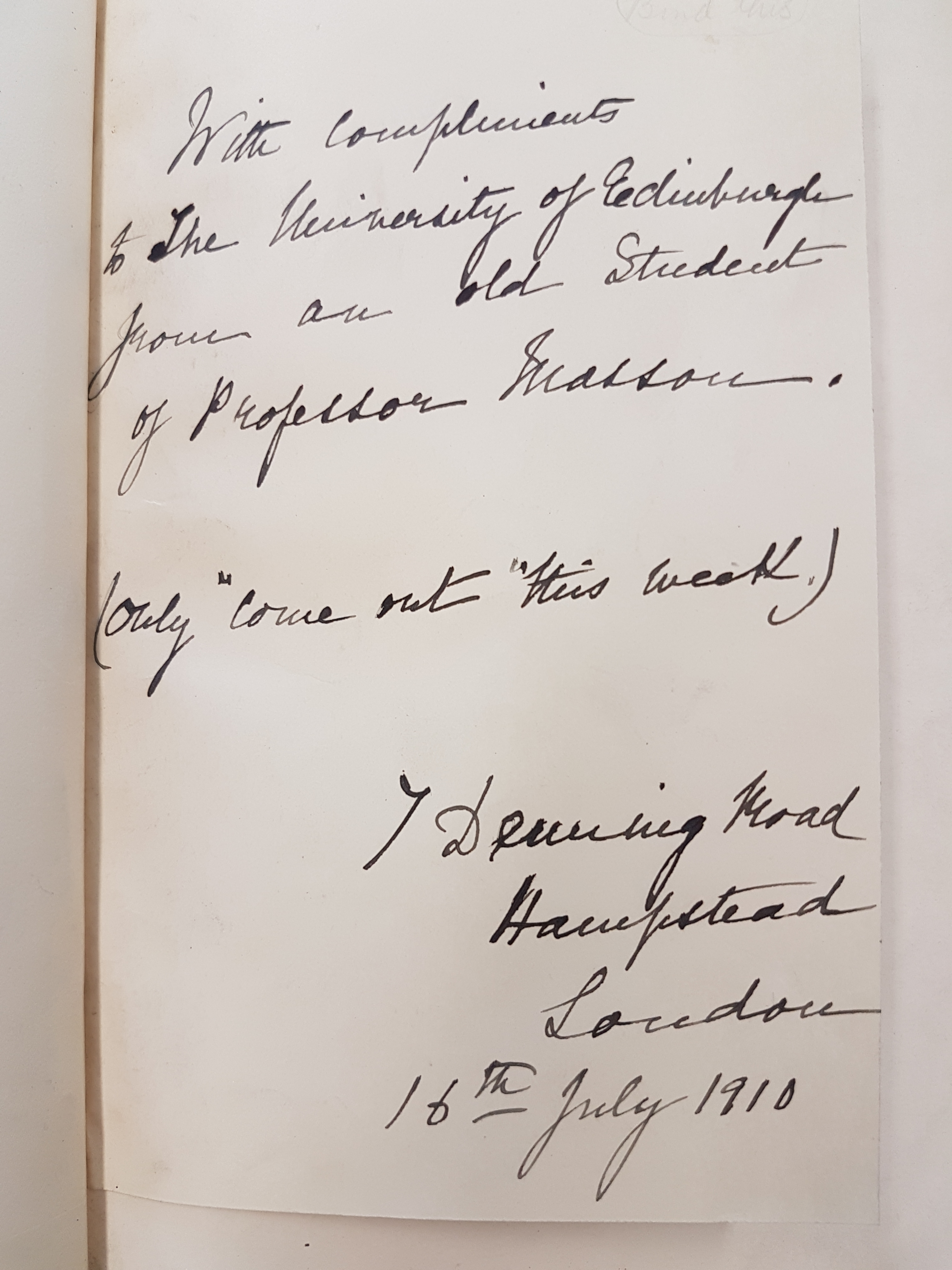
Dedication of CC Stopes's book, William Hunnis and the Revels of the Chapel Royal (1910)

- The Bacon/Shakespeare Question (London: T.G. Johnson, 1888).
- The Bacon/Shakespeare Question Answered (London: T.G. Johnson, 1889).
- British Freewomen: Their Historical Privilege (London: Swann Sonnenschein, 1894).
- Shakespeare's Warwickshire Contemporaries (Stratford-upon-Avon Press, 1897; revised edition, 1907).
- Shakespeare's Family: a Record of the Ancestors and Descendants of William Shakespeare (London: Eliot Stock, 1901).
- The Sphere of 'Man' in Relation to that of 'Woman' in the Constitution (London: T Fisher Unwin, 1908).
- William Hunnis and the Revels of the Chapel Royal (London: Louvain; David Nutt, 1910).
- Burbage and Shakespeare's Stage (London: De La More Press, 1913).
- Shakespeare's Industry (London: Bell & Sons, 1916).
- The Life of Henry, Third Earl of Southampton (Cambridge: Cambridge University Press, 1922).

== Notes and references ==
=== Sources ===
- Boas, Frederick S. (1931). "Charlotte Carmichael Stopes, Some Aspects of her Life and Work". Essays by Divers Hands: Being the Transactions of the Royal Society of Literature of the United Kingdom. New Series. X. OCLC 191709435.
- Briant, Keith (1962). Passionate Paradox: The Life of Marie Stopes. New York: W.W. Norton & Co. OCLC 14626008.
- Green, Stephanie (2013). The Public Lives of Charlotte and Marie Stopes. London: Pickering & Chatto. ISBN 9781848932388.
- Hall, Lesley A. (2005). "Stopes, Charlotte Brown Carmichael (1840–1929)". Oxford Dictionary of National Biography (online ed.). Oxford University Press. doi:10.1093/ref:odnb/53016. (Subscription, Wikipedia Library access or UK public library membership required.)
- Mayhall, Laura E. Nym (2000). "Defining Militancy: Radical Protest, the Constitutional Idiom, and Women's Suffrage in Britain, 1908–1909". The Journal of British Studies. 39 (3): 340–71. doi:10.1086/386223. ISSN 1545-6986. S2CID 145258565.
- Stopes, Charlotte Carmichael (1898). "The Higher Education of Women in Scotland". Shafts. 4 (6): 95–101.
