= Mary Russell Walker =

Scottish teacher

- Born: 1846; Edinburgh
- Died: 20 November 1938 (aged 91–92); Edinburgh
- Education: Maria Grey Training College
- Occupations: Lecturer and head teacher
- Known for: Founding head of St. George's High School for Girls

Mary Walker (1846 – 20 November 1938) was a Scottish teacher who was the founding head of the first Scottish teacher training college (St George's Training College) and the head of the first Scottish day school, St. George's High School for Girls to teach girls to pass university entrance exams.

== Life ==
Walker was born in Edinburgh in 1846 to William and Margaret Walker. Her father was an accountant, and his work took him and his family to Sweden and America. Apart from this she had a dull education in Glasgow but a prosperous upbringing. In 1873 she became a member of the Edinburgh Ladies' Educational Association (ELEA), a group of women who wanted to improve women's access to education. The first meeting had taken place seven years before involving Mary Crudelius, Madeline Daniell and Sarah Mair. Their aim was to get women into Edinburgh University and Walker became the "chief intellect and administrator".

In 1876, the ELEA decided to improve the pre-university stage of women's education and advertised classes in St. George's Hall to help women pass university entrance level qualification. They also developed correspondence courses for women who could not attend classes,

In 1882 she moved to London to attend teacher training at the Maria Grey Training College. She was top of her year and she took a job at the college as a lecturer (mainly) in psychology. She worked there until 1885 when her expertise was called for back in Edinburgh. She was involved with others like Sarah Mair in setting up the St George's Training College which would train the first women secondary school teachers in Scotland. Mary was made the head of the college and when St. George's High School for Girls was formed in 1888 she became its head as well. The first fifty students started in October 1988 using a building in Melville Street. The school was the first Scottish day school for girls which taught students all the way up to university entrance level. Girls from St. George's were among the first female graduates of Edinburgh University.

Walker died in Edinburgh in 1938.
