= St George's School, Edinburgh =

Coordinates: 55°57′00″N 3°14′00″W

Location
- Garscube Terrace; Edinburgh, City of Edinburgh, EH12 6BG; Scotland

Information
- Type: Private day and boarding
- Motto: Trouthe and honour, fredom and curteisye
- Religious affiliation: Non-denom
- Established: 1888
- Founder: Dame Sarah Mair
- Headteacher: Carol Chandler-Thompson
- Gender: Girls
- Age: 3 to 18
- Enrolment: 720
- Houses: 6 school houses: Argyll, Buccleuch, Douglas, Lindsay, Moray and Strathmore
- Colours: Red, navy, white
- Publication: The Chronicle
- School fees: £14,530-£23,824 per year
- Website: stge.org.uk

St George's School is a private girls' school in the Ravelston district of Edinburgh, Scotland.

In 2018 the school celebrated the 130th anniversary of its founding in 1888.

In 2021 the school updated its name to St George’s School, Edinburgh.

The school is an all-through school from 3–18 years on one self-contained campus in the heart of Edinburgh. The size of the whole school is typically around 700 pupils and this is divided into three schools based on age and stage, including an Upper School (and Sixth Form), Middle School and Junior School with a Nursery.

== History ==
The history of the school is an important part of the story of the Edinburgh Association for the University Education of Women and their drive to create university education for women in Scotland. The first meeting had taken place in 1866 before involving Mary Crudelius, Madeline Daniell and Sarah Mair. Their aim was to get women into Edinburgh University and Walker became the "chief intellect and administrator". In 1876, the ELEA decided to improve the pre-university stage of women's education and advertised classes in St. George's Hall to help women pass university entrance level qualification. They also developed correspondence courses for women who could not attend classes,

In 1885 Mary Russell Walker was recalled from the Maria Grey Training College to Edinburgh to lead the St George's Training College which would train the first women secondary school teachers in Scotland. Mary was made the head of the college and when St. George's High School for Girls was formed in 1888 she became its head as well. The first fifty students started in October 1888 using a building in Melville Street. The school was the first Scottish day school for girls which taught students all the way up to university entrance level. Girls from St. George's were among the first female graduates of Edinburgh University.

In 1912 the school took its first board students and the following year St George's Training College became part of the school. By 1920 it had fifty trainee teachers.

In 1939 the training college facility closed. During the second world war the army had the use of the school building whilst the students went south. Hallrule Hall in Bonchester Bridge became the school's temporary home from 1939 to 1942. When the students returned the building had to be renovated.

== Curriculum ==
The school's academic curriculum is a mix of GCSEs at 16, followed by Highers and Advanced Highers in the Sixth Form (S5 and S6).

In 2006 the headteacher started a cooperation programme with Chinese institutions, and by 2007 the school had Chinese clubs and Standard Mandarin as one of the languages offered.

=== Examination courses ===
St George's students follow two-year GCSE courses, leading to examination at age 16, at the end of S4. Most girls will take nine subjects, including English Literature and English Language.

== Engineering club ==
The school has an engineering club in which the members are restoring a Triumph Spitfire car.

== British Council’s International School Award (2017–2020) ==
In 2019 the school was awarded a two year grant to run an Erasmus + programme entitled Community and Culture. This allows girls currently in S2 (Upper 4) to work collaboratively with students in Austria and Italy. Students will visit each other’s schools and learn more about what community and culture mean for them.

== Links with boys schools ==
Many events are held in conjunction with the long standing Edinburgh boys' school, Merchiston Castle School.

== Notable alumni ==
- Kaye Adams, broadcaster and journalist
- Carol Brown Janeway, translator and editor.
- Phyllis Bone, sculptor and first female member of the Royal Scottish Academy
- Sheila Burnford, novelist
- Dr Cordelia Fine, academic psychologist and writer
- Brigit Forsyth, actor
- Louise Linton, screenwriter and actress
- Candia McWilliam, award-winning author
- Penny Macmillan, journalist and broadcaster
- Kathleen Scott, Baroness Kenett, sculptor.
- Marie Stopes, scientist, author and pioneer in the field of birth control.
- Katie Targett-Adams, musician and recording artist
- Alice Thompson, novelist, 1996 winner of the James Tait Black Memorial Prize
- Isabel Oakeshott, award-winning journalist, author and commentator

== Boarding ==
The girls from the ages of ten to eighteen live in Houldsworth House on the campus on the edge of the school grounds. The student Head of Boarding is elected by the boarders. The school has around 50 boarders, about 7% of the number of pupils. The boarders form an integral part of the school and are made up of approximately 50% UK and 50% international students. St George's School celebrated the centenary of boarding at the school in 2012.

== See also ==
- Margaret Houldsworth
- Sarah Mair
- Jean Lindsay, headmistress, 1960–1976
- Mary Russell Walker
