= Masson Hall =

Hall of residence in Edinburgh, Scotland

Coordinates: 55.9431967°N 3.1902208°W

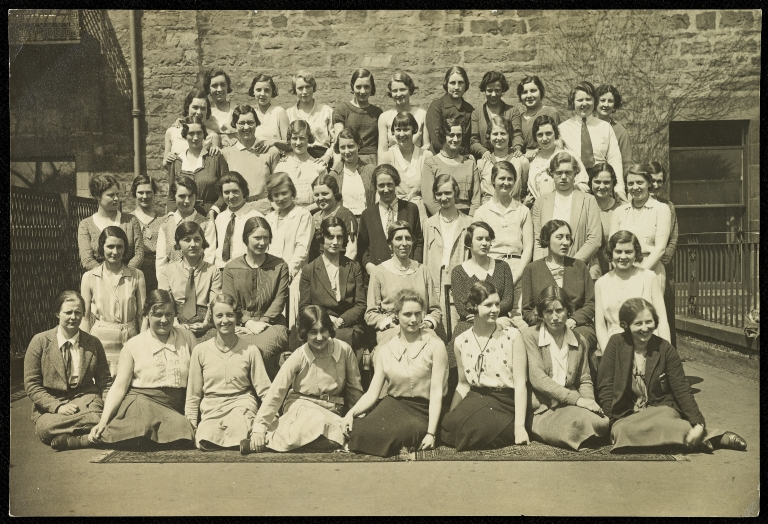
Most likely Masson Hall residents, between the years 1924-1937

Masson Hall opened in 1897 as the first 'proper' hall of residence for women attending the University of Edinburgh. It was established by the Edinburgh Association for the Education of University Women (EAEUW) at 31 George Square. This site is now part of the University of Edinburgh Library.

== History ==
In the 1890s, having successfully secured women's rights to receive instruction and graduate from the University of Edinburgh, the EAUW turned its attention to women's welfare while studying. Prior to the establishment of Masson Hall, there had been two other attempts to provide women from outside Edinburgh with accommodation, both named after Mary Crudelius who was the founder of EAEUW. The opening of Masson Hall followed a three-year period of fundraising and campaigning by Margaret Houldsworth and Louisa Stevenson who were active members of the EAEUW.

Masson Hall was formally opened by Miss Balfour of Whittinghame on 24 November 1897. Among the distinguished guests was Professor David Masson, after whom the Hall was named.

The first warden was Dr Frances Simson, who remained in post for more than 20 years. Simson was one of the first eight Edinburgh women graduates.

When the site was redeveloped in 1964, Masson Hall moved to 2 South Lauder Road, which is now a listed building. Masson Hall closed in 1994. Professor Masson's name continues to be remembered through Masson House, which is a three-star hotel rather than student accommodation. The modern Masson House is situated in the University's Pollock Halls of Residence.
