= Margaret Houldsworth =

Margaret Marshall Houldsworth (14 September 1839 – 29 October 1909) was a British campaigner for women's education and a philanthropist.

Houldsworth was born in Chorlton-cum-Hardy, which was then in Lancashire, to Henry Houldsworth and Marianne Houldsworth (née Burt). Her family were cotton manufacturers who also had business interests, including mining and iron interests, in Glasgow and Lanarkshire. The family moved to Scotland, where her parents died in the later 1860s and Houldsworth went to live with her brother near Lasswade for some time before settling in Edinburgh.

In 1871, she joined the Edinburgh Ladies' Educational Association which promoted university education for women. Margaret Houldsworth became vice-president after Mary Crudelius died in 1877 and was still with the association, now called the Edinburgh Association for the University Education of Women, in 1892 when women were at last admitted to the Scottish universities. She also played an active role in setting up the Masson Hall residence for female students at the University of Edinburgh.

From 1872 she belonged to the Edinburgh Ladies' Debating Society led by Sarah Mair and, alongside Mair, was a central figure in starting classes and correspondence courses for women, and then in establishing St George's Training College and St George's School for Girls. The causes she supported benefited financially from her family's business success. As well as contributing to educational projects, Houldsworth supported the Edinburgh National Society for Women's Suffrage, and Sophia Jex-Blake's Hospital and Dispensary for Women and Children, a forerunner of Bruntsfield Hospital.

Houldsworth died at home in Edinburgh, and was buried in Cambusnethan, near her parents' last home at Coltness.
