= Henry Stopes =

Henry Stopes (1852 in Colchester – 5 December 1902, in Greenhithe) was an English brewer, architect and amateur palaeontologist of repute in late 19th century London. He amassed the largest private collection of fossils and lithic artefacts in Britain. He was the husband of Shakespearean scholar and feminist, Charlotte Carmichael Stopes, and father of Marie Stopes, the birth control advocate. Stopes was the first Briton to claim to have found palaeolithic implements in the Thames river valley.

== Life and career ==
Stopes was born into the brewing business. Although apprenticed elsewhere, when his brother Aylmer died in 1871, he was brought into the family brewing business as his father's junior partner and was apparently successful at his job. As a keen amateur palaeontologist, he regularly attended meetings of the British Association for the Advancement of Science. He was elected to the Royal Historical Society in 1876, the year he met Charlotte Carmichael at the Glasgow meeting of the Royal Association.

Henry Stopes, despite being married with children, managed to follow both his passion and his family business, while branching out into engineering work which involved improvements in brewery architecture and into financial endeavors in the USA. He authored Malt and Malting: An Historical Scientific and Practical Treatise which was published in 1885. It is a well-regarded, important and wide-ranging work and its content has stood the test of time well. He even rented a house in Swanscombe, near Gravesend, Kent, which he used as a base to search for palaeological materials.

However, his life was turned around by bankruptcy in 1892, when he was briefly incarcerated in Holloway Prison. He was forced to sell the family home in Upper Norwood and took up full-time residence at Swanscombe, while Charlotte spent some time in Edinburgh before moving into a flat in Torrington Square near the British Museum. Henry continued his palaeological research, though he visited Charlotte from time to time when he needed to deal with what affairs he had to.

His health deteriorated in the last ten years of his life, as he searched through the gravel pits around Swanscombe in his efforts to find evidence of early man in Britain. In the last six months of his life he was quite ill, dying of tuberculosis in a cottage at Greenhithe near Swanscombe on 5 December 1902, aged 50.

== Legacy ==
Stopes's palaeontological collection, estimated to consist of over 100,000 items was sold in 1912 to the National Museum of Wales at Cardiff, where it is found today.

The Geologists' Association in Britain triennially awards the Henry Stopes Memorial Medal for work on the Prehistory of Man.
