= Edith Hughes (architect) =

Scottish architect (1888–1971)

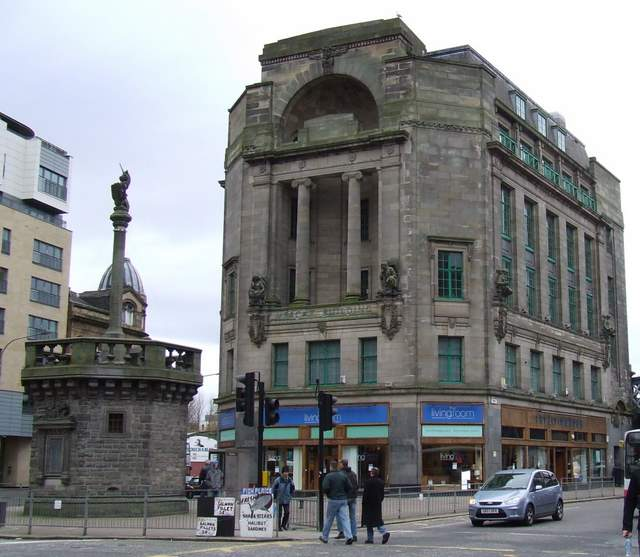
- Glasgow Mercat Cross (left), designed by Edith Hughes in 1930
- Born: Edith Mary Burnet; 7 July 1888; Edinburgh, Scotland
- Died: 28 August 1971 (aged 83)
- Other name: Edith Mary Wardlaw Burnet Hughes
- Education: Gray's School of Art
- Occupation: Architect
- Spouse: Thomas Harold Hughes
- Children: 3
- Parent(s): George Wardlaw Burnet, May Crudelius
- Awards: the first woman nominated for membership of the Royal Institute of British Architects (RIBA), elected an Honorary Fellow of the RIAS in 1968,
- Buildings: Glasgow Mercat Cross and Mercat Building

Edith Mary Wardlaw Burnet Hughes HonFRIAS (7 July 1888 – 28 August 1971) was a Scottish architect, and is considered Britain's first practising female architect, having established her own architecture firm in 1920. (Note: Hughes was not Britain's first woman architect; this may have been Elizabeth Wilbraham who was active in the early 1660s.)

== Early life ==
Edith Mary Burnet was born in Edinburgh, the daughter of May Crudelius and George Wardlaw Burnet, an advocate. The family lived at 6 West Circus Place in the Stockbridge district. The family moved to 59 Queens Road in Aberdeen when her father was created Sheriff Substitute for Aberdeenshire around 1890.

Her grandmother Mary Crudelius campaigned for women's education. Following her father's death in 1901 she was raised by her uncle, John James Burnet, a prominent architect. They lived at 18 University Gardens in Glasgow.

She travelled in Europe, studying art and architecture, and attending lectures at the Sorbonne, until around 1911, when she joined Gray's School of Art, Aberdeen. Initially studying garden design, she switched to architecture, and was awarded a diploma in 1914. The following year she was appointed a lecturer at the School. She briefly worked in the office of Jenkins and Marr, before marrying her former tutor, architect Thomas Harold Hughes (1887–1949), in 1918.

== Career ==
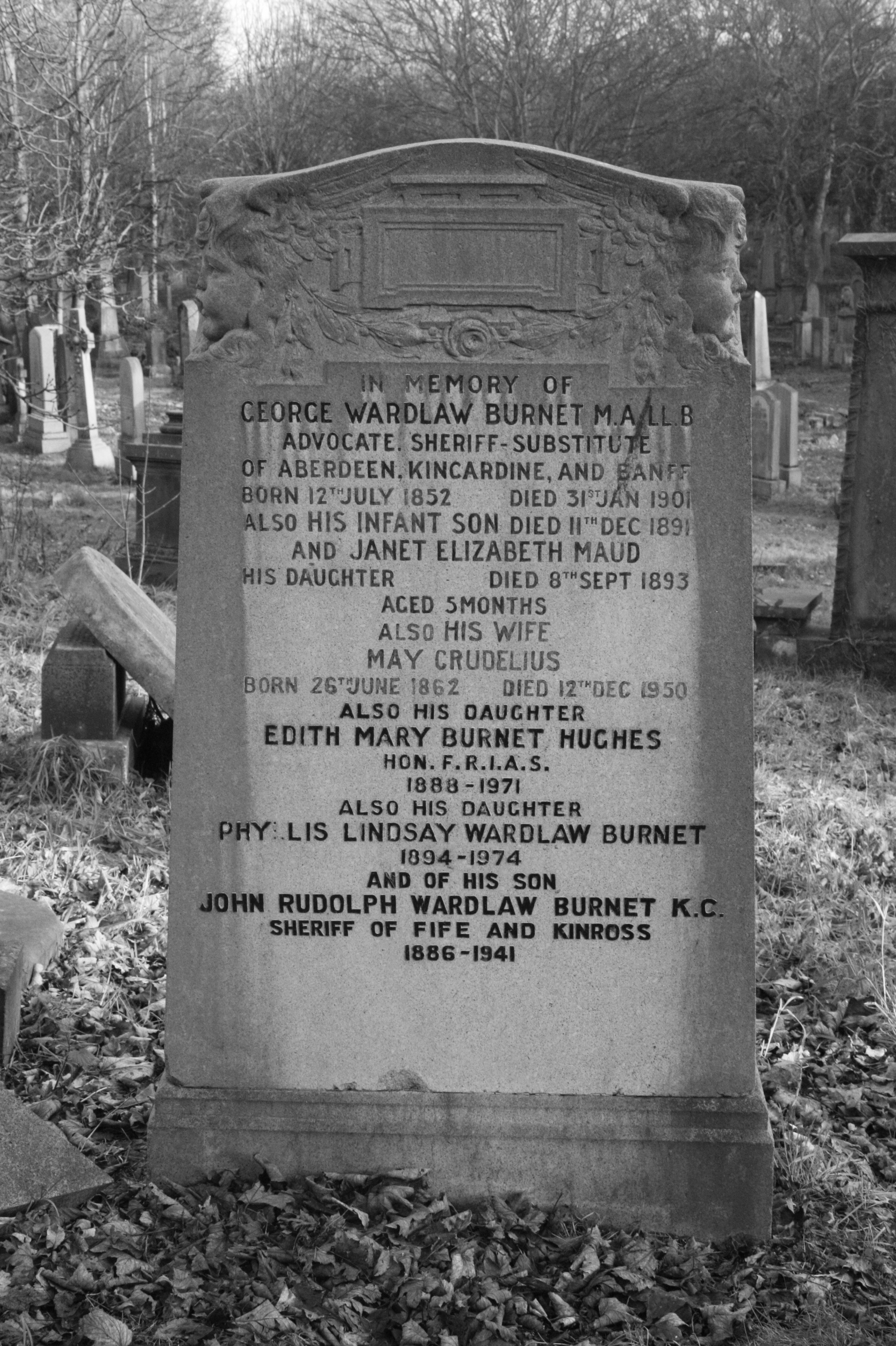
The grave of Edith Hughes, Warriston Cemetery, Edinburgh

Hughes and her husband were refused a place in Burnet's London office, partly because there was no female lavatory. However, her husband joined Burnet's Glasgow office as a partner in 1919. Disagreement with another partner led to his departing the following year, to take up teaching at the Glasgow School of Art, where he later became head of architecture. She set up her own practice in Glasgow in 1920. In 1927, she became the first woman nominated for membership of the Royal Institute of British Architects (RIBA), the nominators including John Begg and her uncle, John Burnet. However, RIBA's legal advisers stated that she could not be elected, and RIBA remained an all-male institution until the election of Josephine Miller in 1938. She was similarly denied access to the Royal Incorporation of Architects in Scotland (RIAS). After the Second World War, Hughes re-established her practice in Edinburgh. She was elected an Honorary Fellow of the RIAS in 1968. She retired from practice soon after receiving her fellowship, and moved to Kippen, dying of pneumonia in Stirling in 1971.

== Public lectures ==
In January 1926, Hughes lectured to a large audience on the subject of "The Modern House" in the Temperance Cafe in Falkirk. Illustrating her talk with lantern slides, Hughes identified four criteria for a modern house; these being health, convenience, beauty and cost. In its article about the lecture, the Falkirk Herald stated that the lecture was very informative and much appreciated

In the following year, at the invitation of the Dundee Women Citizens' Association, Hughes gave a talk in the East Foresters' Hall, Dundee on the subject of domestic architecture. Hughes praised American kitchen design, particularly the versatile use of a dresser. Hughes subscribed to the motto: "a place for everything and everything in its place". She also talked of the ugliness of modern dwellings, which inspired the Dundee Courier to headline its article "Ugliness of modern dwellings."

== Burial place ==
She is buried with her parents in Warriston Cemetery in north Edinburgh. The grave lies on the main west path on its east side, where the ground level drops to the lower south section.

== Family ==
Hughes and her husband had three daughters. She and her husband lived mostly separately after the Second World War until his death in 1949.

== Works ==
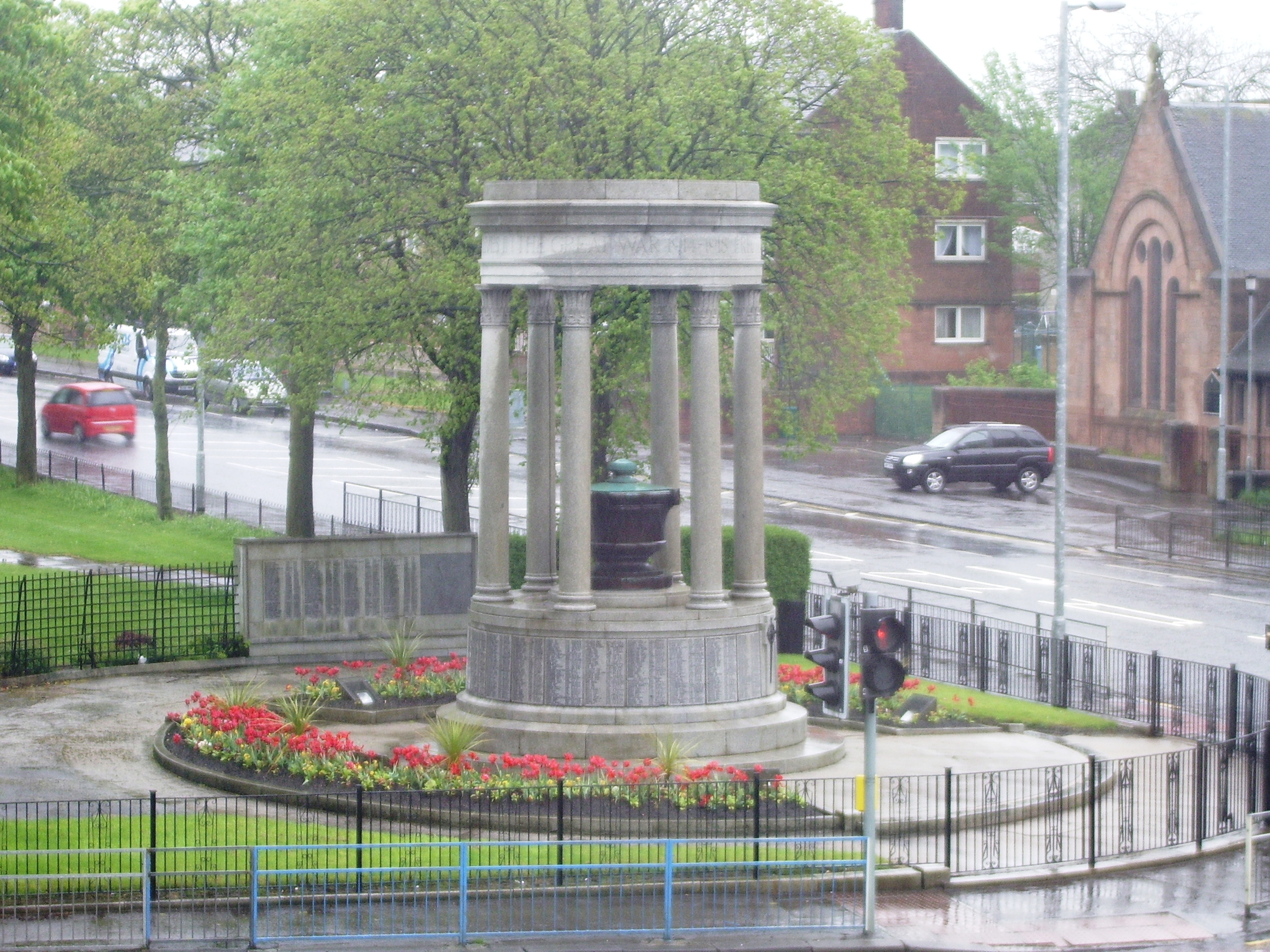
Coatbridge War Memorial (1924)

Her first commission was for the "Rutherford Memorial" in 1916, although the location and nature of this work are unknown. In her own work, she concentrated on domestic commissions, including many residential alterations, and specialised in kitchen design. Her public works included the Coatbridge War Memorial (1924), and the Glasgow Mercat Cross (1930), a replica of a medieval mercat cross located at Glasgow Cross. She carried out alterations to the Glasgow Society of Lady Artists' building in Blythswood Square, Glasgow, and was responsible for the conversion of several Edinburgh townhouses into flats. She was engaged on works at St Mary's Episcopal Cathedral and Music School, Edinburgh, from 1956 to 1965. Her most important commissions for the Cathedral were the stone font, with its wrought iron cover, and a wrought iron screen to the Chapel of St Margaret of Scotland.

== See also ==
- Women in architecture
