= Edinburgh Association for the University Education of Women =

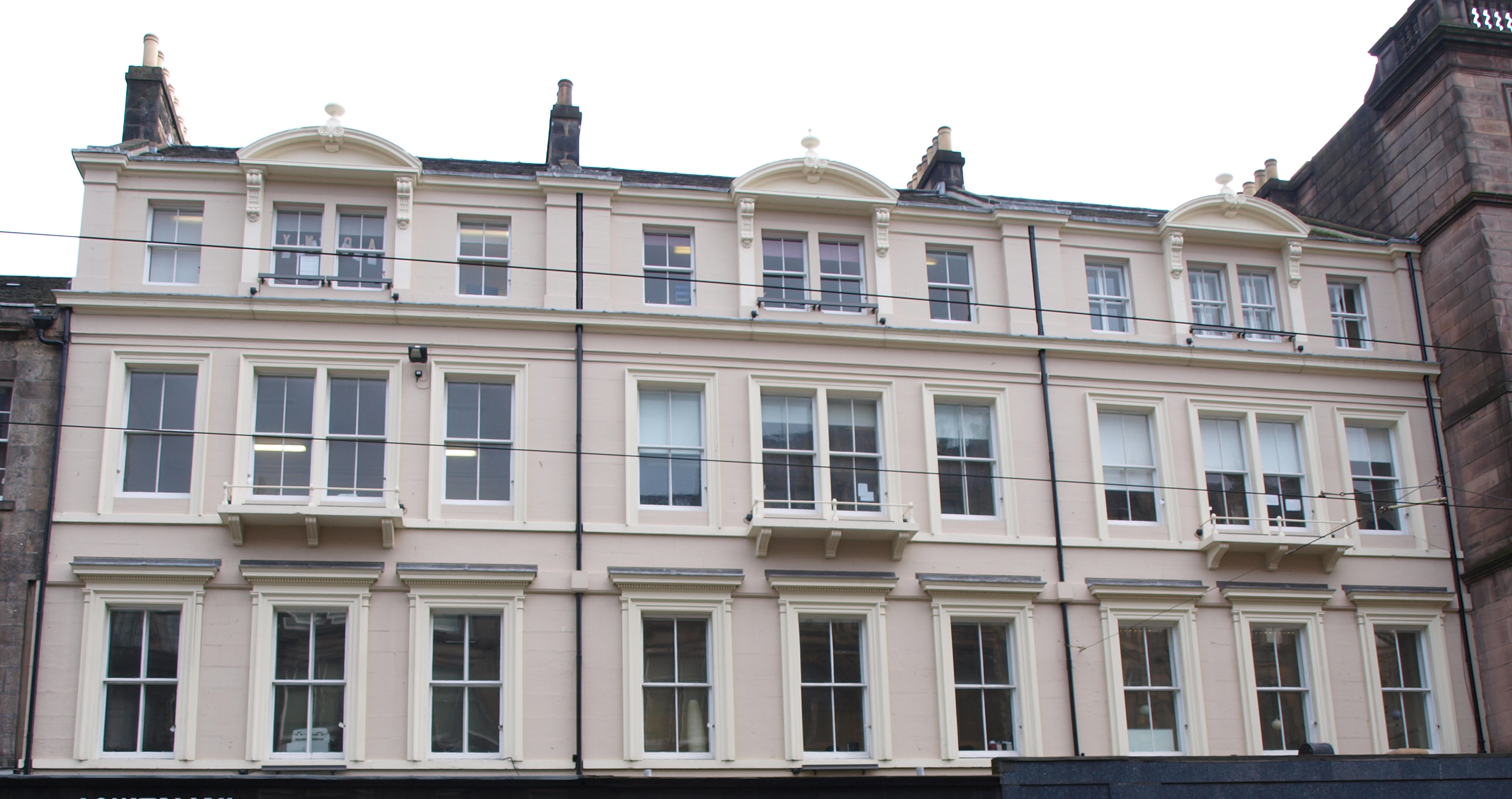
15 Shandwick Place, Edinburgh

The Edinburgh Association for the University Education of Women (EAUEW), originally known as the Edinburgh Ladies' Educational Association (ELEA), campaigned for higher education for women from 1867 until 1892 when Scottish universities started to admit female students. For nearly a quarter of a century it arranged its own classes for women with lecturers from Edinburgh University, and it was connected with a wider campaign across Europe to open universities to women students.

== 1867–1892 ==
The ELEA was founded by Mary Crudelius, with Sarah Mair and others, in 1867 just before Sophia Jex-Blake started pressing Edinburgh University to admit medical students. Jex-Blake's campaign, covered by the press in both London and Scotland, made Edinburgh a visible part of a nationwide movement demanding higher education opportunities for women. Crudelius wished to keep the ELEA separate from the controversy raging over the women aspiring to become doctors, and she built up support amongst male academics, with strong encouragement from David Masson, Professor of Rhetoric and English Literature, who offered the first university-level lectures to Edinburgh women in 1868, and whose wife Emily Rosaline Orme Masson was a leader in the women's suffrage movement in Edinburgh. The lectures were well-attended and within the next five years the association had arranged for several more subjects to be offered, including science subjects.

In August 1867 the University of London had been given powers to hold special examinations for women. In 1868 the university drew up plans to grant them certificates, although it would be another ten years before women could graduate with full degrees. One of David Masson's earliest ELEA lectures in 1868 responded to this news:

"Is it to be borne that our Scottish Universities are to be Universities for only the men of the land, while other Universities are Universities for the men and women of the land? Is it to be borne that those of Scotland's daughters, be they few or be they many at present, who desire not to be behind any of their British sisters in culture, shall have to look for encouragement and aid to the Universities in England ... ?"

Although Crudelius was often successful in avoiding confrontations of the kind which erupted around the women medical students, she did not entirely avoid tensions between the university and the association.

In 1873 Mary Russell Walker joined the group and she was said to "the intellect" in the group and she was good at administration. In 1874 a university certificate was offered in arts subjects and the association's classes were listed in the university calendar from 1877. The first ELEA member to sit exams for the university certificate was Charlotte Carmichael, who became the first woman in Scotland to receive a university acknowledgement of upper education.

In 1877 the Aberdeen Ladies' Educational Association and the Glasgow Ladies' Educational Association were formed.

Nonetheless, while support for women's educational rights was growing and a system of recognition for educational achievement was in place, the universities were still officially closed to female students. Further campaigning and public discussion led to the Universities (Scotland) Act 1889, after which universities started to make arrangements for women to study and graduate on the same terms as men. The first female undergraduates at Edinburgh were admitted in 1892 and eight graduated in 1893, all of them having previously studied in EAUEW classes. All classes were mixed except those for medical students. By 1914 a thousand women had degrees from Edinburgh University.

The valuation roll of Edinburgh 1885–86 mentions the Edinburgh Association for the University Education of Women being at 15 Shandwick Place.

== From 1892 ==
Once women were admitted as students, the EAUEW turned its attention to providing facilities for them. Louisa Stevenson and Margaret Houldsworth were leading figures in raising funds for the Masson Hall (named to honour Professor Masson's support) which opened in 1897 with accommodation and a library, overseen by the warden, Frances Simson, one of those first eight women graduates. Hopes that it might become a women's college similar to Girton College, Cambridge were not realised, but for many years the Hall was a community of women within the wider university. Masson Hall was relocated in the 1960s when the University redeveloped its site in George Square, and the EAUEW was wound up in the 1970s.

The equivalent organisation in Glasgow was the Glasgow Association for the Higher Education of Women which brought about the establishment of Queen Margaret College. In 1892 the college started to amalgamate with Glasgow University but kept its own identity for some time.

Aberdeen University also opened its doors to women in 1892 with the first 20 female students matriculating in 1894.

At the University of St Andrews, women could be undergraduates from 1892, and on-campus board and residence was available for them from 1896. From the 1870s, St. Andrews had offered women a special diploma qualification, like an external degree called the LLA: Lady Literate in Arts.

== EAUEW members and supporters ==
Influential members of the EAUEW included:

- Mary Crudelius
- Margaret Houldsworth
- Sarah Mair
- Marion Newbigin
- Frances Simson
- Flora Stevenson
- Louisa Stevenson
- Mary Russell Walker
- Charlotte Carmichael Stopes
- Christian Guthrie Wright

Lecturers for the EAUEW included:

- David Masson, English Literature
- Gerard Baldwin Brown, Fine Art
- Henry Calderwood, Moral Philosophy
- Alexander Campbell Fraser, Logic
- Peter Guthrie Tait, Physics

The founder members were:

- Mary Crudelius
- Harriot Mair, mother of Sarah Mair
- Helen Evans (Helen De Lacy Evans Russel, one of the Edinburgh Seven)
- Madeline Daniell (1832–1906)
- Mrs Ranken
- Anna Lindsay

Sarah Mair was present at the meeting when the Association was founded, but the Association did not consider her a founder member, presumably because she was unmarried and rather young.
