= Frances Simson =

Scottish suffragist (1854–1938)

Frances Helen Simson (1854–1938) was a Scottish suffragist, campaigner for women's higher education and one of the first of eight women graduates from the University of Edinburgh in 1893.

== Early life ==
Born in Edinburgh on 2 April 1854, Simson was one of the nine children of Jane Christiana Aberdein (b. 1820) and William Simson (1811–1858), secretary of the Bank of Scotland. She lived with her family in Eton Terrace, New Town, for much of her life.

== Education ==
Simson was the eldest, at 38 years of age, of all the women who graduated in Masters of Arts, made possible by the Universities (Scotland) Act 1889. In 1867, Simson had enrolled in degree classes delivered by the Edinburgh Association for the University Education of Women (EAUEW; formerly the Edinburgh Ladies' Educational Association, ELEA, founded in 1867).

== Women's Rights ==
Together with Margaret Nairn, Elsie Inglis, Frances Melville and Chrystal Macmillan, Simson petitioned the right for five women graduates to vote for the university MP at the general election of 1906 to no avail. Women did not have the right to vote in elections, but Simson and the others wanted to make this a test case, so went to an appeal in November 1907, which also failed. The group then were rallied to raise £1000 to support mounting their case for women graduates to be given the vote, to the House of Lords in November 1908 where Macmillan opened and performed as senior counsel, with Simson making general argument and closing the case on 12 November. Margaret Nairn wrote to Simson on 17 November 1908, thanking her for speaking in their cause, and saying that 'your words and Miss Macmillan's will go down in history' and quoted Shakespeare's Love’s Labours Lost. Act IV. Sc. 1. ’and praise we may afford to any lady that subdues a Lord!’ (original letter is in the University of Edinburgh archives).

A celebratory lunch of women graduates for Simson and Chrystal MacMillan to recognise the way in which they had conducted their case to the House of Lords was held on Saturday 9th January 1909 in the Women Students' Union of Edinburgh University. Dr Elsie Inglis presided.

Women did not get the right to vote for members of parliament in the UK until the passing of the Representation of the People Act 1918, and that only applied to certain categories of women. Simson was also the president of the Scottish Universities Women's Suffrage Union, and affiliated to NUWSS.

Simson was warden of Masson Hall of Residence for Women Students in Edinburgh from 1897 to 1917.

== Later life ==
In October 1933, the year University of Edinburgh celebrated its 350th anniversary, Simson was awarded an honorary degree of LLD, as the only woman graduand, recognising her responsibility in the university education of women. Later that year, at the time she was president of the Edinburgh Equal Citizenship Society which emerged from the national group successor to the NUWSS, and was working with Rosaline Masson, and honoured in a luncheon held at the site of the former Caledonian Hotel on Princes Street, Edinburgh. Lady Alexandra Watson, Dame Sarah Siddons, Dr Frances Melville, Professor E.T. Whittaker, and Dr Marion Gilchrist were among a hundred-plus guests that attended the event in honour of her work campaigning for women's education.
