= Memorial drinking fountain "Crkvenac" =

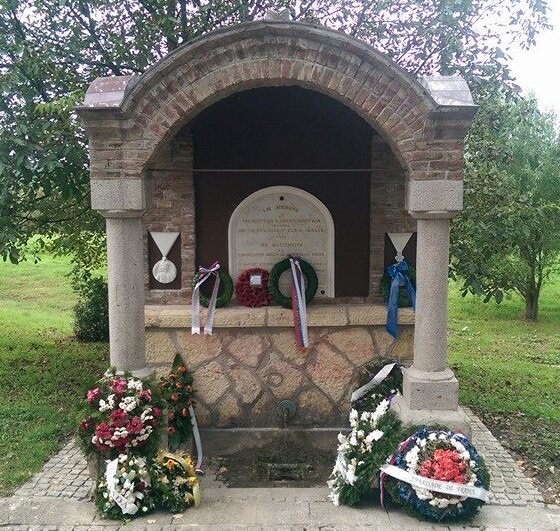

The memorial drinking fountain "Crkvenac" in Mladenovac is situated near the centre of Mladenovac, in a dale along the road which connects Mladenovac with Smederevska Palanka in the community Topovske šupe. The fountain was erected in the First World War in the honour of the Scotland women who cured and took care of the wounded Serbian soldiers. It represents the immovable cultural property as the cultural monument (the Decision on promulgation of the municipal assembly Mladenovac, "Official Gazette of the City of Belgrade" no. 14/81).

== Medical missions ==
During the invasion and the withdrawal as well as during the later military operations on the territory of Serbia, many allied medical missions operated. "The doctors and nurses belonging to the medical missions from the Great Britain, and above all, the female members of the Scottish Female Hospitals acted in a disciplined and efficient way, as far as possible. From the very beginning of the invasion, the British hospitals in Mladenovac, Lazarevac and Valjevo found themselves at the front line, so to speak, and in very difficult conditions, they continued to admit the wounded, whose number grew bigger and bigger every day. It lasted just for couple of days, and then the withdrawal was ordered. The hospital from Mladenovac withdrew to Kragujevac and joined the other hospitals in Kragujevac. Within ten days only, it admitted and provided medical care to about ten thousand wounded soldiers."

== The building of the fountain ==
In the autumn 1915, on the former site of the II Reserve Hospital at Mladenovac, the fountain was erected as a token of gratitude and memory to the medical mission of Scottish women in Serbia, and its founder Dr. Elsie Inglis, who selflessly gave medical help and care to the wounded Serbian soldiers and to the diseased population as well. The fountain was built by the soldiers of the Moravska Division, I summoning, under the supervision of the Reserve Captain 1st class Borivoje Popović. The fountain was named Crkvenac after the spring it was built on.

== Dr. Elsie Inglis ==
Elsie Inglis (Elsie Maud Inglis; Nainitak, 16 August 1864 — Newcastle 26 November 1917) was a Scottish doctor and a suffragist who particularly stood out by her work within the Scottish military hospitals in Serbia during the First World War. She was the first woman who received the highest Serbian medal – The Order of the White Eagle. She is commemorated on the £50 banknote issued by the Clydesdale Bank since 2009.

== Architecture ==
The memorial drinking fountain was made of concrete, bricks and marble in the shape of half-calotte which is at the front supported by two columns, whereas from the back it rests on the vertical masonry wall. The vaulted white marble plaque is placed at the centre of the vertical wall. It bears the following inscription, both in English and in Serbian: «1915 – To the memory of the Scottish Women` Hospitals in Serbia and its founder Dr. Elsie Inglis – erected by the II Reserve Hospital of Mladenovac. Built by the soldiers of the Moravska Division under the supervision of the Reserve Captain 1st class Bor. Popović ». The letters of the inscription are coloured in golden yellow. To the left and right from the marble plaque there are the representations of the Serbian medals in low relief – The Miloš Obilić Medal for Bravery and the Order of the Karađorđe Star with Swords. On the rear wall of the structure, centrally positioned, there is a crossed sabre and rifle in a low relief, and at either side of it, there is a military trumpet. On the top of the half-calotte there is a stylized šajkača, Serbian traditional cap. The erection of the memorial while the hospital and the disinfection centre were still functioning and the medical mission and Dr. Inglis were still present, speaks of a gratitude and respect so great that the expression of it allowed no delay and oblivion, especially not in the times of war, when the length of a human life is of little consequence. Rustically treated architectural elements of medieval Serbian monasteries naively transposed to the drinking fountain, the šajkača on the top, the symbols of warfare and military medals, all carry epic poetics. The soldiers and people shared with those brave magnificent women what they cherished most – old monasteries, the Serbian people holy shrines; weapons, the symbols of freedom and bravery; Serbian orders, the honour of the nation and šajkača, the traditional cap of the Serbian soldiers and farmers, awarding all that as the appreciation to those brave women long before the state officially did it. Every year, near the Memorial Drinking Fountain "Crkvenac", on 15 September there is a manifestation dedicated to the lustration of the fountain, in the honour and gratitude to Dr. Elsie Inglis, who was the leader of the largest women medical mission.

== Restoration of the fountain ==
According to the project and under the supervision of the Cultural Heritage Protection Institute of Belgrade during the 1980s a huge works were conducted on the restoration and recovery of the fountain and on the decoration of the surrounding area, as well as at the beginning of 2000s, when the restoration and recovery works were also done. Unfortunately, the water that people used to drink and that used to heal the wounded and the sick is no longer potable. Also, the memorial drinking fountain Crkvenac is one of our most famous memorials abroad. The memorial fountain Crkvenac in Mladenovac is an established cultural heritage, a cultural monument.
