= Elsie Inglis =

Scottish doctor (1864–1917)

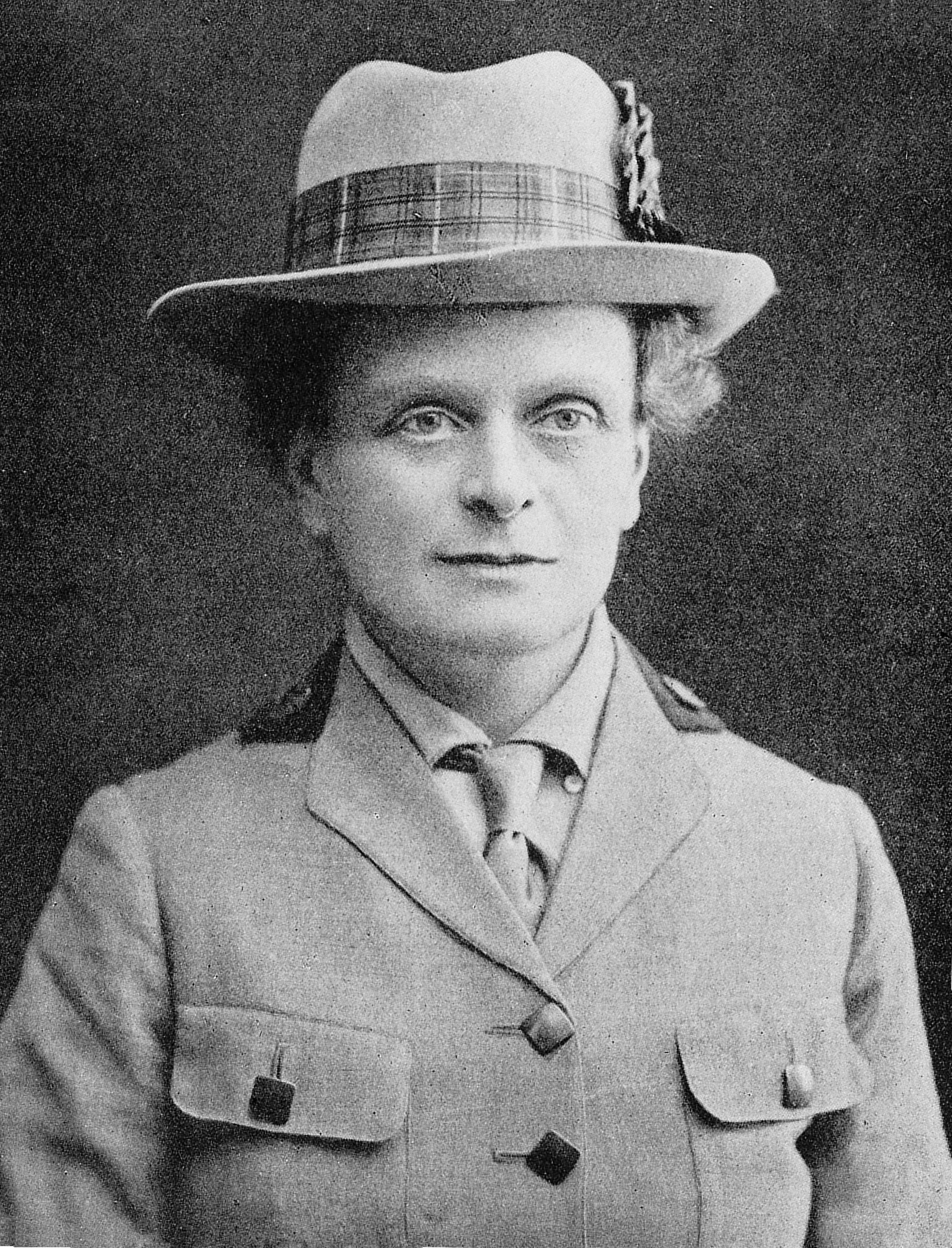
- Born: Eliza Maud Inglis; 16 August 1864; Naini Tal, North-Western Provinces, British India
- Died: 26 November 1917 (aged 53); Newcastle upon Tyne, England
- Resting place: Dean Cemetery
- Other name: The Woman with the Torch
- Education: University of Edinburgh
- Occupation: Doctor
- Known for: Suffragist; First World War doctor; campaigner for women and children's health
- Honours: Serbian Order of the White Eagle (First Class)

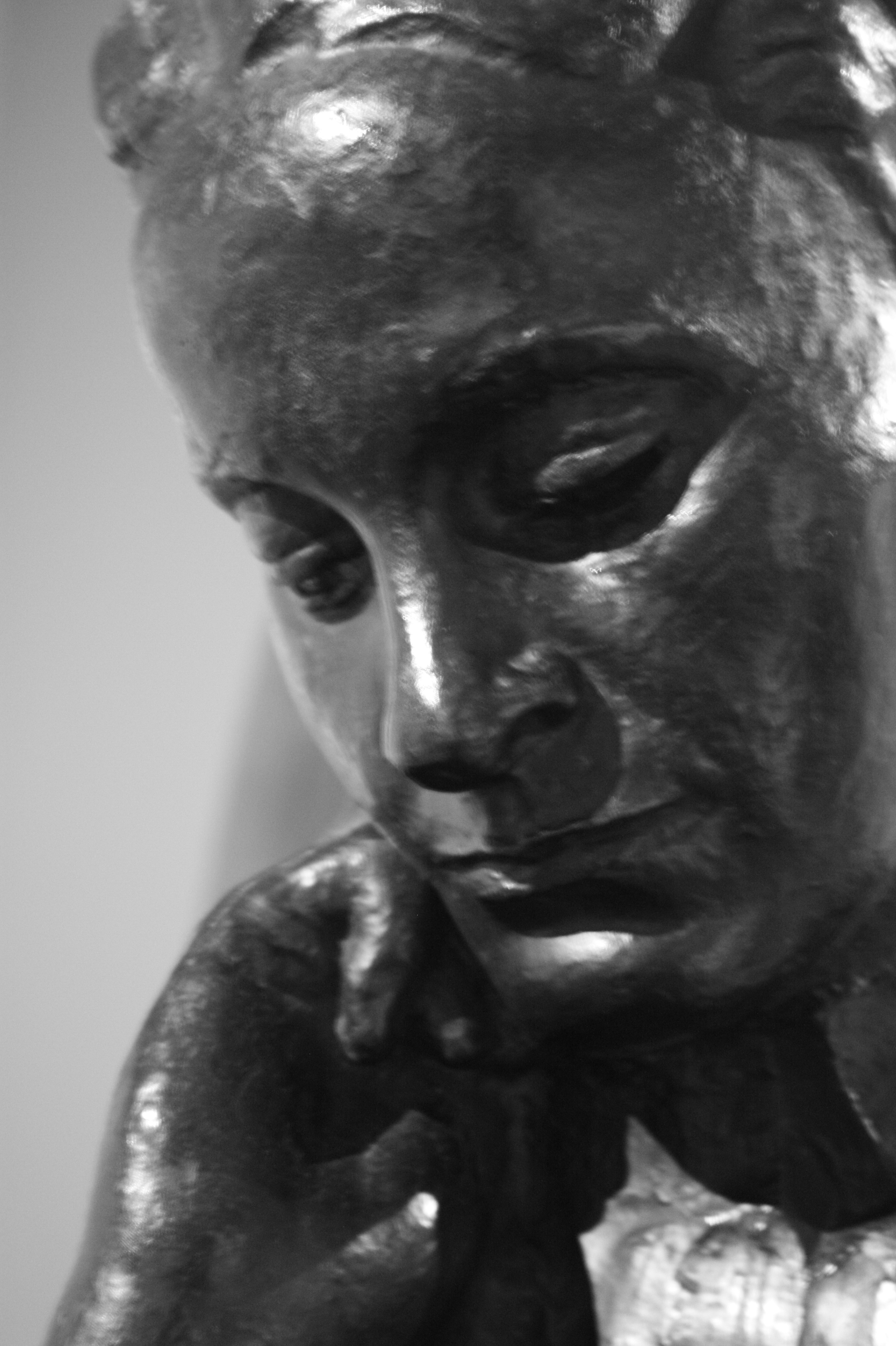
Bronze bust of Elsie Inglis by Ivan Meštrović 1918, SNPG

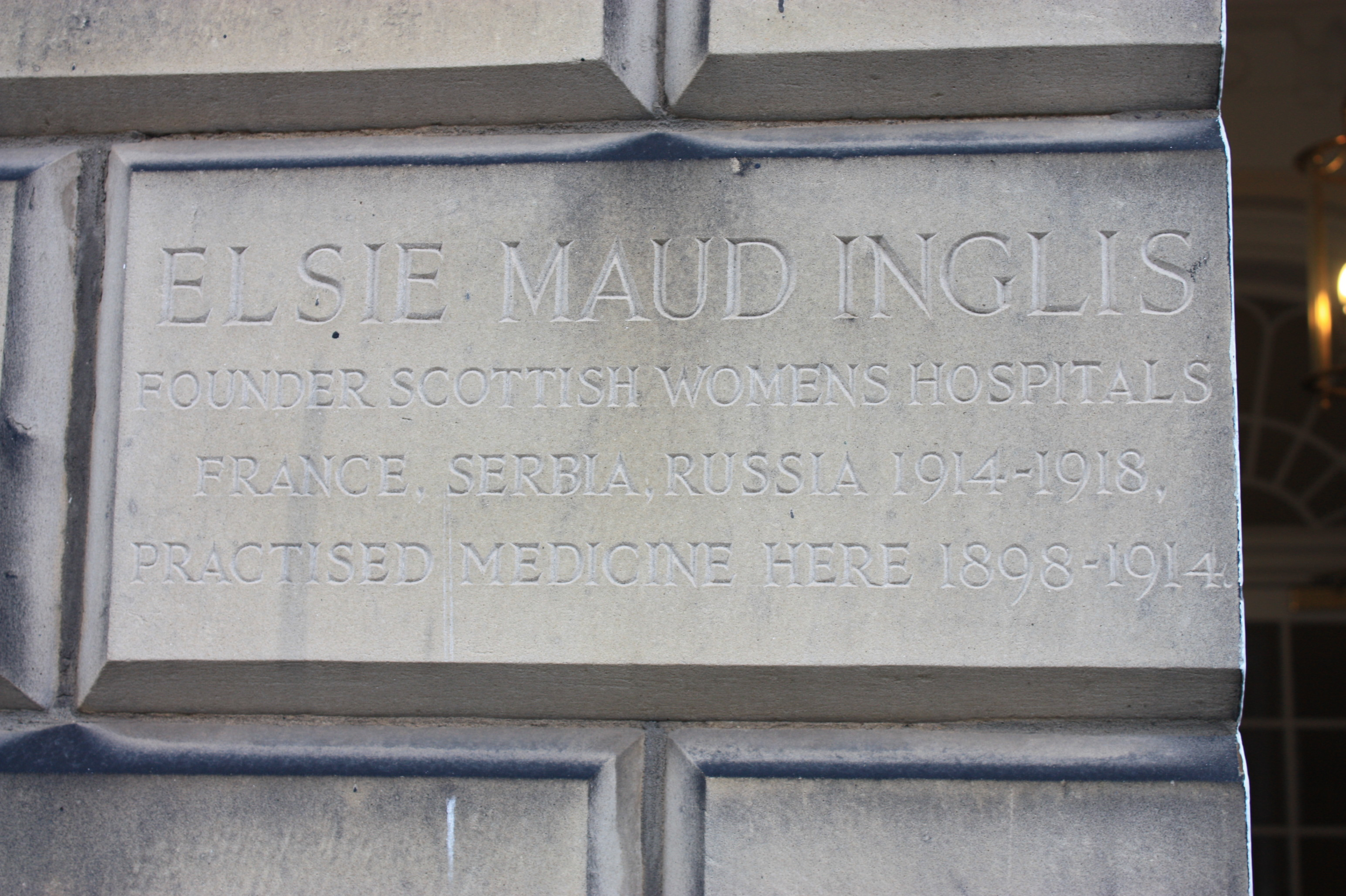
Plaque marking Elsie Inglis's surgery, Walker Street, Edinburgh

Eliza Maud "Elsie" Inglis (16 August 1864 – 26 November 1917) was a Scottish medical doctor, surgeon, teacher, suffragist, and founder of the Scottish Women's Hospitals. She was the first woman to hold the Serbian Order of the White Eagle.

== Early life and education ==
Inglis was born on 16 August 1864, in the hill station town of Naini Tal, British India. Inglis had eight siblings and was the second daughter and third youngest. Her parents were Harriet Lowes Thompson (1827–1885) and John Forbes David Inglis (1820–1894), a magistrate who ended his career in the Indian civil service as Chief Commissioner of Oudh, having been first employed under the East India Company, as did her maternal grandfather. Inglis's parents considered the education of a daughter as important as that of a son, and also had them schooled in India. Elsie and her sister Eva had 40 dolls which she used to treat for 'spots' (measles) she had painted on.

Inglis's father was religious and used his position in India to "encourage native economic development, spoke out against infanticide and promoted female education." Inglis's maternal grandfather was George Powney Thompson. She was an aunt of the gynaecologist Sir Henry Simson, and a distant cousin of fellow female medical pioneer Grace Cadell.

Inglis's father retired (when aged 56) from the Indian Civil Service and moved to Edinburgh, via Tasmania, where some of her older siblings had settled. Inglis went on to a private education in Edinburgh (where she had led a successful demand by the schoolgirls to use private gardens in Charlotte Square) and finishing school in Paris. Inglis's decision to study medicine was delayed by nursing her mother, during her last illness (scarlet fever) and her death in 1885, when she felt obliged to stay in Edinburgh with her father.

In 1886, the Edinburgh School of Medicine for Women was opened by Dr Sophia Jex-Blake and Inglis started her studies there. In reaction to Jex-Blake's methods, and after two fellow students Grace and Georgina Cadell were expelled, Inglis' father was prominent in the Scottish Association for the Medical Education of Women, which founded the Edinburgh College of Medicine for Women. Its sponsors included Sir William Muir, a friend of her father from India, then Principal of the University of Edinburgh. Inglis's sponsors also arranged clinical training for female students under Sir William MacEwen at the Glasgow Royal Infirmary.

In 1892, she obtained the Triple Qualification, becoming a Licentiate of the Royal College of Physicians of Edinburgh, the Royal College of Surgeons of Edinburgh and the Faculty of Physicians and Surgeons of Glasgow. She was concerned at the low standard of care and lack of specialisation in the needs of female patients, and so obtained a post at Elizabeth Garrett Anderson's pioneering New Hospital for Women in London, and then at the Rotunda in Dublin, a leading maternity hospital. Inglis gained her MBChM qualification in 1899, from the University of Edinburgh, after it opened its degrees to women. Her return to Edinburgh coincided with nursing her father in his final illness before he died on 4 March 1894, aged 73. Inglis at the time noted that 'he did not believe that death was the stopping-place, but that one would go on growing and learning through all eternity'.

Inglis later acknowledged that 'whatever I am, whatever I have done – I owe it all to my father'.

== Career ==
=== Medical practice ===
Inglis returned to Edinburgh in 1894, set up in practice with Jessie MacLaren MacGregor, who had been a fellow student. Elsie later became a lecturer in gynaecology at the Medical College for Women. Considering that women and children's medicine was under resourced, they opened a maternity hospital, named The Hospice, for poor women alongside a midwifery resource and training centre, initially in George Square. The Hospice was then provided with an accident and general service as well as maternity, with an operating theatre and eight beds, in new premises at 219 High Street, on the Royal Mile, close to Cockburn Street, and was the forerunner of the Elsie Inglis Memorial Maternity Hospital. In 1913, Inglis travelled across to the US (Michigan) to visit and learn from a new type of maternity hospital.

Inglis often waived the fees owed to her and would pay for her patients to recuperate by the sea-side, with polio being a particular childhood illness she was concerned with. Inglis was a consultant at Bruntsfield Hospital, a nearby hospital for women and children, and the Hospice merged with them in 1910.

Inglis's surgical skills were recognised by colleagues as "she was quiet, calm, and collected, and never at a loss, skilful in her manipulations, and able to cope with any emergency."

Inglis lived and was in a relationship for some time with Flora Murray, a fellow doctor and suffragette.

=== Suffrage movement ===
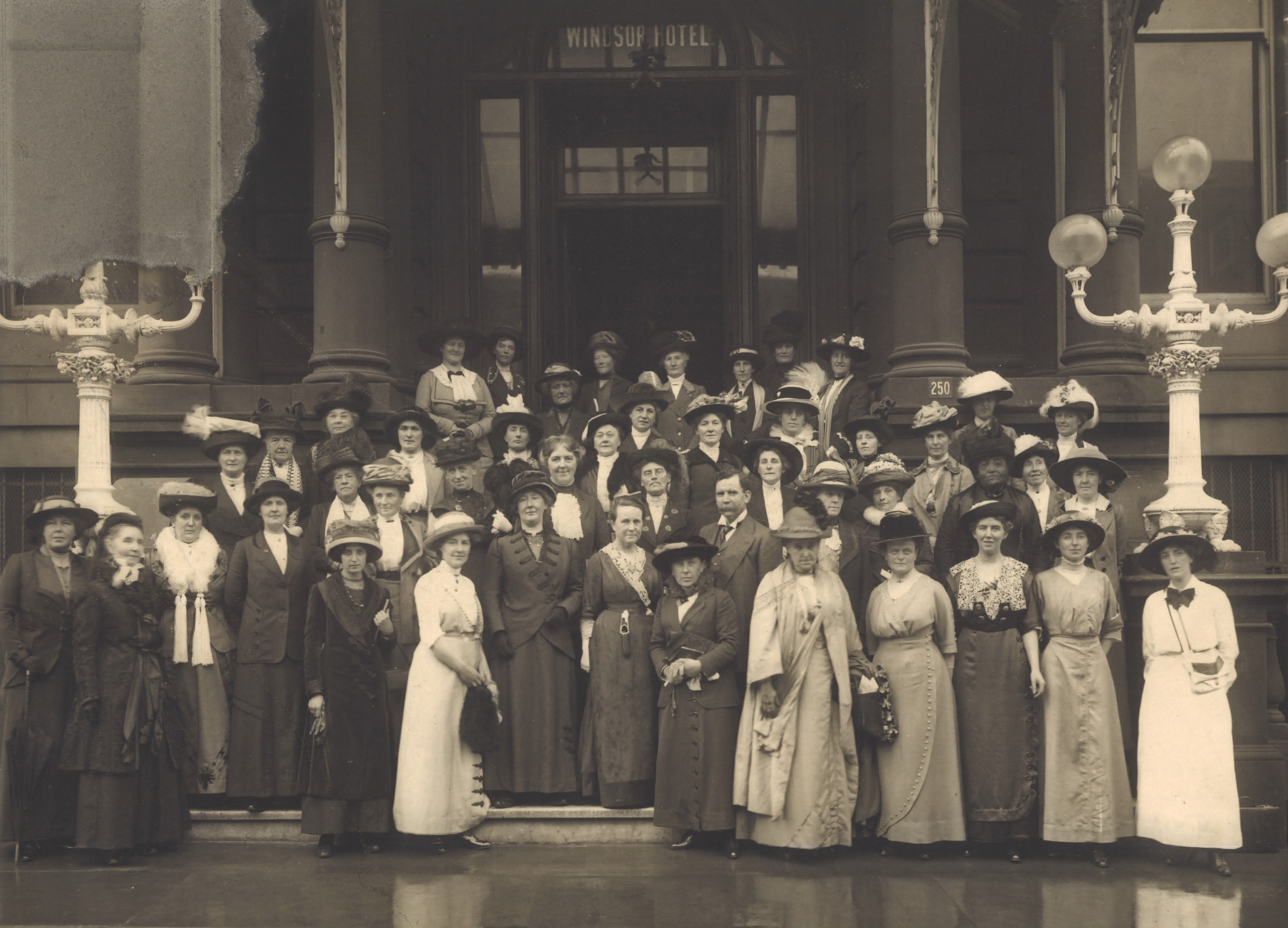
Executive Committee of the Scottish Federation of the National Union of Women's Suffrage Societies in 1913 (fourth from left at front?)

Her dissatisfaction with the standard of medical care available to women led her to political activism through the suffrage movement. She was the secretary of the Edinburgh National Society for Women's Suffrage in the 1890s, supported by her father.

Inglis worked closely with Millicent Fawcett, the leader of the National Union of Women's Suffrage Societies (the NUWSS), speaking at events all over the country. By 1906, "Elsie Inglis was to the Scottish groups what Mrs. Fawcett was to the English; when they too formed themselves that year into a Federation, it was Elsie who became its secretary." From the early years of the Scottish Federation of Women's Suffrage Societies, Inglis was honorary secretary from 1906 and continued in this role right up to 1914.

Inglis spoke in support of suffrage in 1907 with Chrystal Macmillan and Alice Low as fellow speakers, at a NUWSS meeting in Edinburgh's Café Oak Hall. Jessie Scott from New Zealand, where women already had the vote was also a guest speaker.

In January 1909, Inglis presided over a celebratory lunch honouring Chrystal MacMillan and Frances Simson for what The Scotsman newspaper called the "energy, patience and ability" with which they had conducted an appeal to the House of Lords on the subject of women's voting rights. Inglis was quoted as saying that "The Cause" ....was the most important question of the day.

A century later, in The Lancet, Lucy Inglis (a relative) noted Inglis had said 'fate had placed her in the van of a great movement' and was a 'keen fighter'. Inglis's personal style was described by fellow suffragist Sarah Mair as 'courteous, sweet-voiced' with 'the eyes of a seer', a 'radiant smile' when her lips were not 'firmly closed with a fixity of purpose such as would warn off unwarrantable opposition or objections...'

=== First World War ===
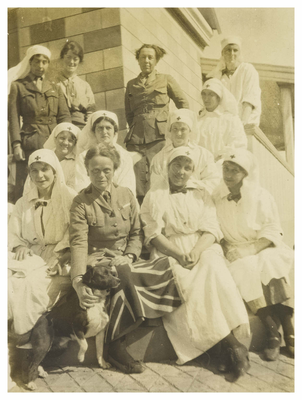
'The Chief' (Elsie Inglis) and some of her sisters SWH – 1916

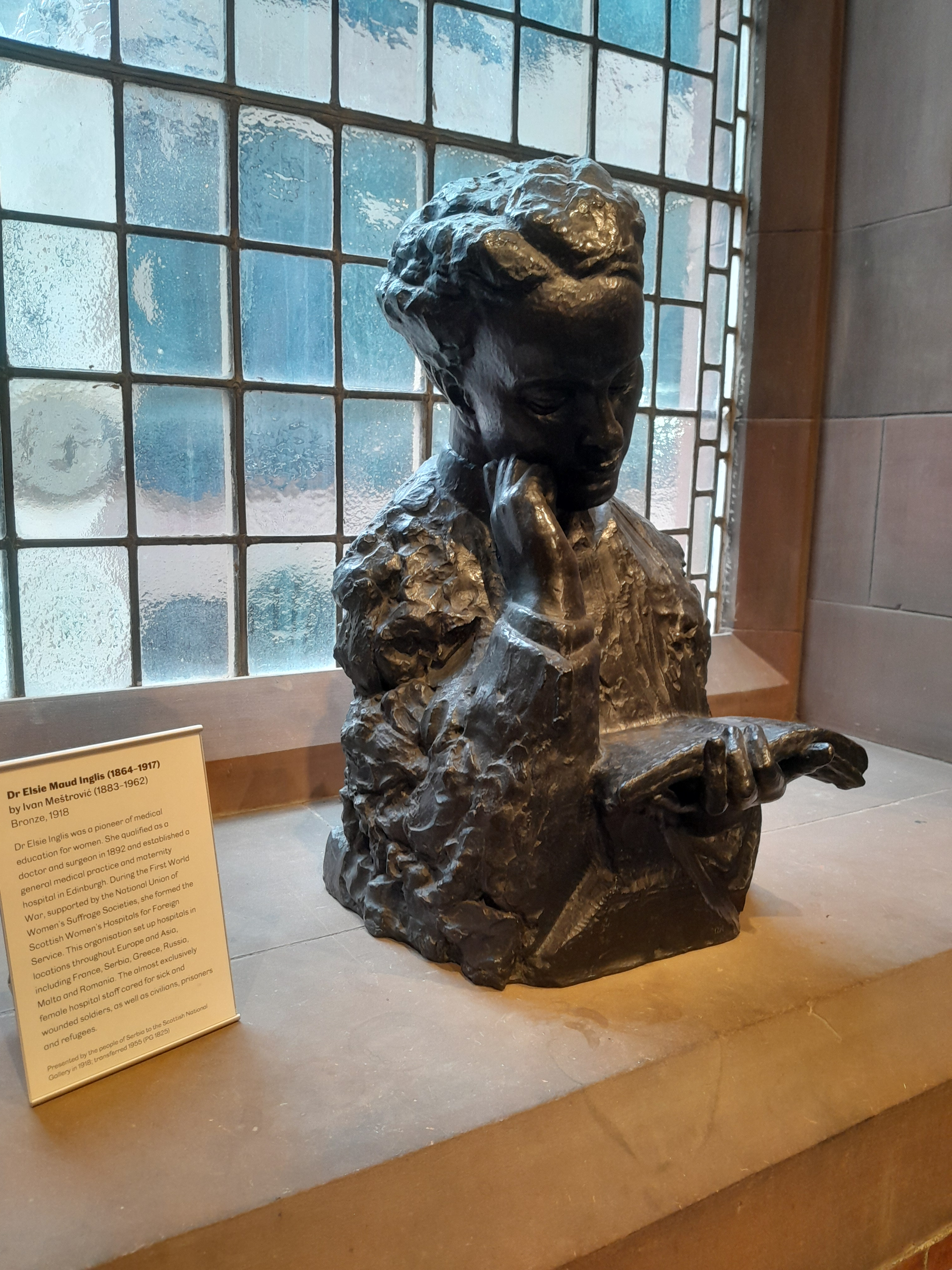
Bust made by Croatian sculptor Ivan Meštrović, exhibited in Scottish National Portrait Gallery in Edinburgh

Although she had already had turned 50 at the start of the conflict, it was during the First World War that she made her mark. Despite government resistance, Inglis established the Scottish Women's Hospitals for Foreign Service Committee, an organisation funded by the women's suffrage movement to provide all female staffed relief hospitals for the Allied war effort, including doctors and technical staff (paid) and others including nurses and transport staff and others as volunteers.

Inglis wanted a neutral name to attract "wide support from men and women". but was able to use her connections to the suffrage movement to raise money for what became the Scottish Women's Hospitals (SWH). Inglis approached the Scottish Red Cross to help with funding, but the head of the Scottish Red Cross, George Beatson denied Inglis' request stating that the Red Cross was in the hands of the War Office and he could have "nothing to say to a hospital staffed by women." To start the project, "she opened a fund with £100 of her own money." Millicent Fawcett, of NUWSS took up the cause and invited Inglis to speak about the SWH in London, and by the next month, Inglis had her first £1,000. The goal was £50,000. Collection boxes had the NUWSS logo in small print, one is held in the National Museum of Scotland.

The organisation was active in sending eventually 14 teams to Belgium, France, Serbia and Russia.

When Inglis approached the Royal Army Medical Corps to offer them a ready-made medical unit staffed by qualified women, the War Office told her, "my good lady, go home and sit still." It was, instead, the French government that took up her offer and established a unit in France and then she led her own unit in Serbia. Inglis was involved in all aspects of the organisation of this service down to the colours of the uniform, 'a hodden grey, with Gordon tartan facings'. The French hospital was based at the Abbey of Royaumont and was run by Frances Ivens from January 1915 to March 1919. Inglis had initially offered a 100-bed hospital but it grew to hold 600 beds as it coped with the severity of battles, including that on the Somme.

Inglis went with the teams sent to Serbia, to work in improving hygiene which reduced typhus and other epidemics there. On her journey, she was to enjoy a last peaceful day of sunshine and starlight on the voyage. The typhus outbreak in Serbia affected the hospital, and eventually took the lives of four of the SWH staff, including Louisa Jordan, after whom the coronavirus pandemic hospital in Glasgow was named in 2020. Four SWH units in Serbia were established but in 1915 Inglis was captured, when the Austro-Hungarian and German forces took over the region, as she had stayed behind with others to repatriate the wounded. Inglis was taken prisoner when at Krushevatz (Kruševac) Hospital in Serbia. Inglis and others were repatriated via neutral Switzerland in February 1916, but upon reaching Scotland, she at once began organising funds for a Scottish Women's Hospital team in Russia. She headed the Scots team when it left in August 1916 for Odessa, Russia. She had appointed two fellow Scottish suffragists, Mary H. J. Henderson as administrator, and Evelina Haverfield as commandant for the new unit. The two SWH units were overcome in the chaos of a retreat with Inglis travelling via Dobruja to Braila, on the Danube with the people in flight, including families, doctors, soldiers and a Romanian officer who had been in Glasgow and knew "British custims" (sic). The Scottish women's journeys and challenging experiences in Serbia were shared by her administrator, Henderson in national and local press and in fundraising talks once she returned home. Inglis was said, in the chaos, to think of her homeland 'there, quiet, strong and invincible, behind everything and everyone'.

At Braila with just six other doctors, only one surgeon, Inglis and team were treating 11,000 wounded soldiers and sailors. A letter in tribute to Inglis, in the name of "The Russian Citizen Soldiers" was written at Easter to "express our sincere gratitude for all the care and attention bestowed on us, and we bow low before the tireless and wonderful work of yourself and your personnel, which we see every day directed towards the good of the soldiers allied to your country". Inglis got the news that her nephew was shot in the head and blinded on the day that she was leaving for Reni, Ukraine. She questioned the eternal battle of good and evil referred to in wartime, when she wrote to her sister expressing her sorrow for her nephew, ending with "we are just here in it, and whatever we lose, it is for the right we are standing...it is all terrible and awful, and I don't believe we can disentangle it all in our minds just now. The only thing is just to go on doing our bit."

Inglis, "an indomitable little figure" lasted another summer in Russia, before she too was forced to return in poor health to the United Kingdom, dying almost on arrival, suffering from bowel cancer. On her final journey, she was seen to stand on deck saying a farewell to each of the Serb officers being evacuated "in quiet dignity."

== Death and legacy ==
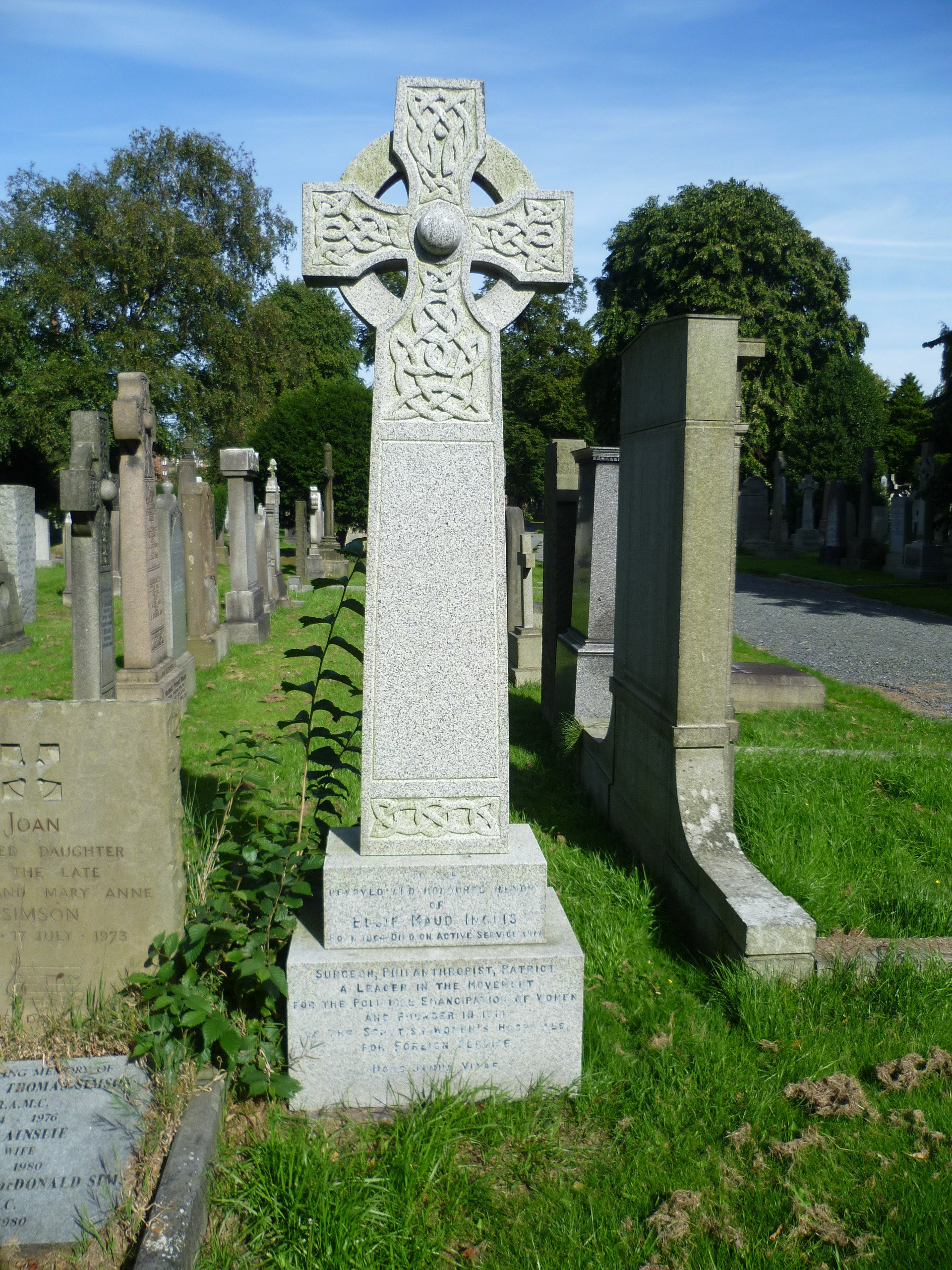
Grave of Dr. Elsie Inglis

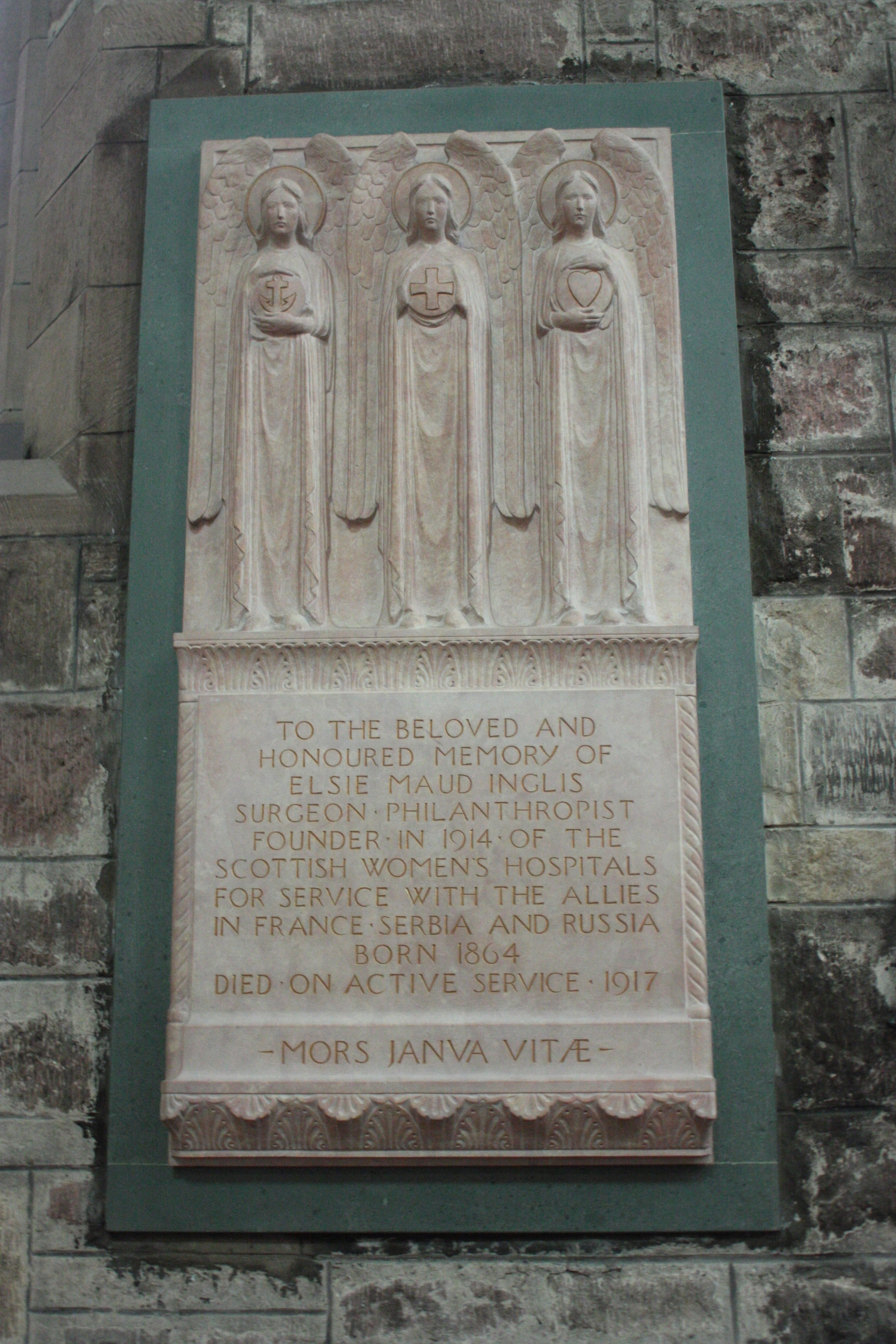
Elsie Inglis Memorial in north aisle of St Giles Cathedral Edinburgh

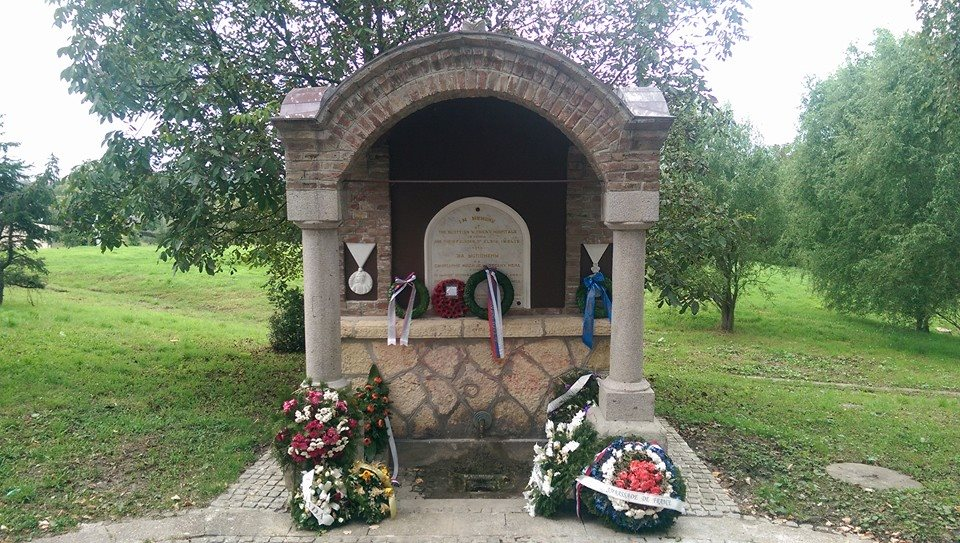
Elsie Inglis Memorial, Mladenovac Serbia

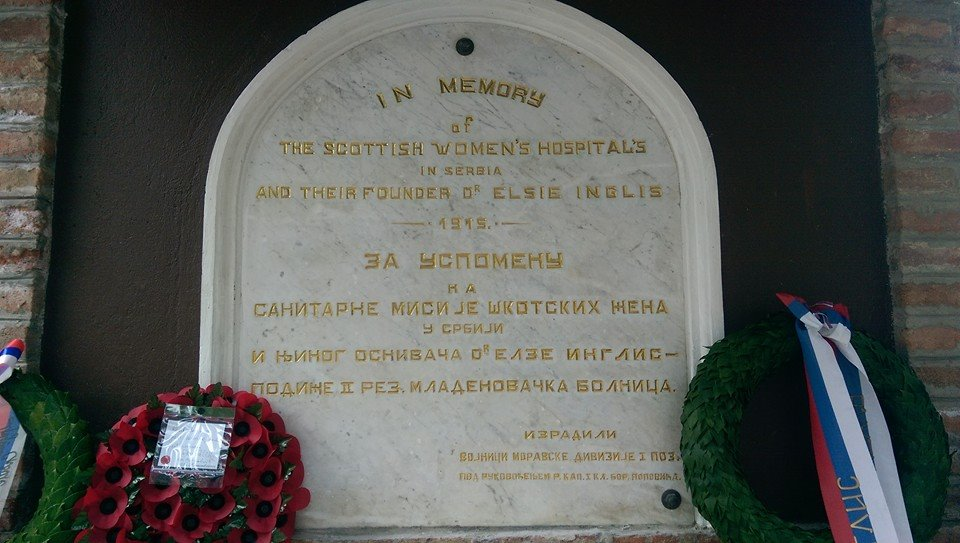
Elsie Inglis Memorial, Mladenovac Serbia

Inglis died on 26 November 1917, the day after she arrived back in Britain, with her sisters at her bedside at the Station Hotel, Newcastle upon Tyne.

Inglis's body lay in state at St Giles Cathedral in Edinburgh, and her funeral there on 29 November was attended by both British and Serbian royalty. The service included the 'Hallelujah Chorus' and the Last Post played by the buglers of the Royal Scots. The streets were lined with people as her coffin went through Edinburgh to be buried at the Dean Cemetery. The Scotsman newspaper wrote that it was an "occasion of an impressive public tribute". Winston Churchill said of Inglis and her nurses "they will shine in history."

In London, a subsequent memorial service, attended by members of the royal families of Britain and Serbia, was held at St Margaret's Church in Westminster, the Anglican parish church of the House of Commons of the United Kingdom.

Inglis is buried in the north section of Dean Cemetery, on a corner north of the central path. Her parents, John Forbes David Inglis (1820–1894) and Harriet Lowes Thompson (1827–1885), as well as her nephew, Sir Henry Simson, lie nearby in the same cemetery.

Her obituary in the British Medical Journal described her as "a born leader, entirely patriotic, and free from self-seeking"

In 1920, Vera Holme declared that Inglis' mantra was that "difficulties only existed to be overcome"

A memorial fountain was erected in Inglis's memory in Mladenovac, Serbia, commemorating her work for the country. A plaque marking her pre-war surgery from 1898 to 1914 was erected at 8 Walker Street, Edinburgh. A portrait of her is included in the mural of heroic women by Walter P. Starmer unveiled in 1921 in the church of St Jude-on-the-Hill in Hampstead Garden Suburb, London. In 1922 a large tablet to her memory (sculpted by Pilkington Jackson) was erected in the north aisle of St Giles Cathedral, in Edinburgh.

Inglis is commemorated on the University of Edinburgh's War Memorial, and her name is included in the accompanying published 786 page Roll of Honour. It can be seen here https://archive.org/details/rollofhonour191400univuoft/page/n103/mode/2up

Her main physical memorial was the building of the Elsie Inglis Memorial Maternity Hospital in 1925 which was operational until 1988. Many Edinburgh children were born there during the 20th century. It was closed by the National Health Service in 1988 and sold off. Part of it is now an old people's home, part is private housing, and parts are demolished; it is no longer recognisable as a hospital. At its closure there were public protests that a new maternity unit should also be named after Inglis, which has not yet happened (2020). A small plaque to Elsie Inglis exists near the south-west corner at the entrance to Holyrood Park.

A nursing career development scheme in NHS Lothian is called 'the Elsies'.

Inglis was commemorated on a new series of banknotes issued by the Clydesdale Bank in 2009; her image appeared on the new issue of £50 notes. In March 2015, the British Residence in Belgrade was renamed 'Elsie Inglis House' in recognition of her work in the country. The ceremony was conducted by the president of Serbia Tomislav Nikolic and the UK Ambassador Denis Keefe said

"Elsie Inglis was one of the first women in Scotland who had finished high education and was a pioneer of medicine. She fought energetically against prejudice, for social and political emancipation of women in Britain. She was also a tireless volunteer, courageous organiser of the Scottish Women's Hospitals and a dedicated humanitarian. Unfortunately, Elsie Inglis didn't live long enough to see the triumph of some of her ideas, but she has had a tremendous influence on social trends in our country. In Scotland she became a doctor, in Serbia she became a saint."

In 2020 it was noted that Serbia's first palliative care hospice will also be named after Elsie Inglis.

In November 2017, a memorial plaque to Elsie Inglis and 15 women who died as a result of their service to the Scottish Women's Hospitals was set in Edinburgh Central Library.

Also in 2017, the University of Edinburgh renamed a courtyard in the medical school in her honour. The university's Principal, Sir Timothy O'Shea, said: "Naming our historic quadrangle after Dr Inglis is a fitting reminder of her remarkable achievements and lasting legacy."

Inglis's name and picture (and those of 58 other women's suffrage supporters) are on the plinth of the statue of Millicent Fawcett in Parliament Square, London, unveiled in 2018.

The Women's Roll of Honour plaque in York Minster also includes Inglis' name.

Inglis's younger sister Eva Helen Shaw McLaren wrote her biography Elsie Inglis, The Woman With the Torch in 1920, and in 2009 a coloured illustrated edition was published, a reference is to Florence Nightingale known as 'The Lady of the Lamp'. The Project Gutenberg has published the former book.

In Eva's papers was found an unpublished manuscript novel by Inglis, 'The Story of a Modern Woman', whose heroine, Hildeguard Forrest, may be seen as autobiographical in part, and in a boating accident the narrator says 'in a sudden flash....[she] suddenly realised she wasn't a coward'.

Inglis was described as one of the 'greatest-ever' Scottish women, 'a great role model and someone young Scots can be proud of'. A journalist called unsuccessfully on the Scottish Ministers to name Edinburgh's Royal Hospital for Children and Young People after Elsie Inglis.

Sir Winston Churchill wrote of the SWH: 'No body of women has won a higher reputation in the Great War.....their work, lit up by the fame of Dr. Inglis, will shine in history'.

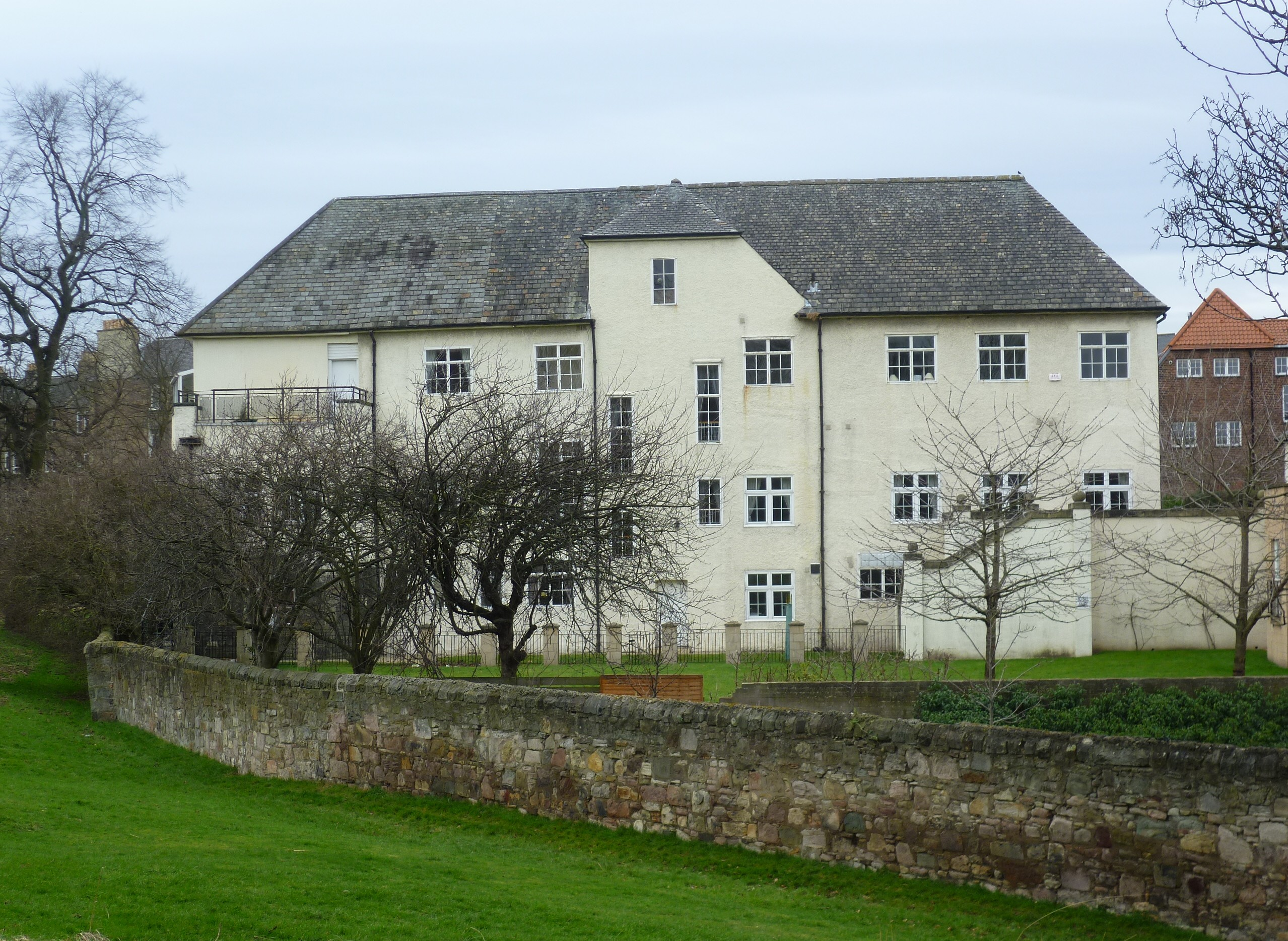
The former Elsie Inglis Memorial Maternity Hospital

=== Statue ===
The Lord Provost of Edinburgh launched a plan to make a permanent memorial to Inglis in the city in November 2021. There are more than 43 statues of men in Edinburgh city centre but only two statues of women, and on the Royal Mile itself (the site for Elsie's statue) there are twelve statues of men, and Elsie's will be the first statue of a woman. There was a campaign to raise the £47,500 funding for the memorial statue, virtual tours (through a QR code on the statue) and other ways to commemorate "a truly revered and treasured figure in Edinburgh's history".

As part of this campaign, an event was held by Girlguiding Scotland on 5 March 2022, in the Meadows in Edinburgh. This event was a sponsored 'sit still', with lots of activities sitting still, such as badge making, first aid and making a shelter from sticks. At this event, there was also a bespoke Elsie Inglis bus tour, provided by Edinburgh Bus Tours, that visited areas linked to Elsie Inglis around Edinburgh. This event was to raise funds for the memorial statue for Elsie, raise awareness and inspire the people of Girlguiding Scotland to do anything they put their mind to. Girlguiding Scotland also created an Elsie Inglis Challenge Pack. Girlguiding Scotland also created an accompanying badge for when members complete some activities from the Challenge Pack.

By May 2022, this crowd-funding drive by Thea Laurie and Fiona Garwood, raised £50,000, by engaging politicians and organisations and public figures like author, Sara Sheridan, tennis coach Judy Murray, scientist Linda Bauld and MSP Jenni Minto, as well as the Lord Provost. They said '"Dr Inglis is the perfect representative for women in Edinburgh. Her achievements in philanthropy and her efforts during World War One are just exceptional. She was a woman who would not be told to sit still and know her place." It will be built on the site of her first hospital at 219 High Street, Edinburgh. A competition for the design of the statue was launched, but on 17 October 2022 the charity's trustees announced that they had decided to cancel the contest and award the commission to Alexander Stoddart, the King's Sculptor in Ordinary. The announcement was met with criticism, and the trustees 'paused' the process to reflect on feedback and to consider their options. The public debate on this controversy has continued into 2025, with an open letter to the Edinburgh city council, with notable supporters from the arts and medicine.

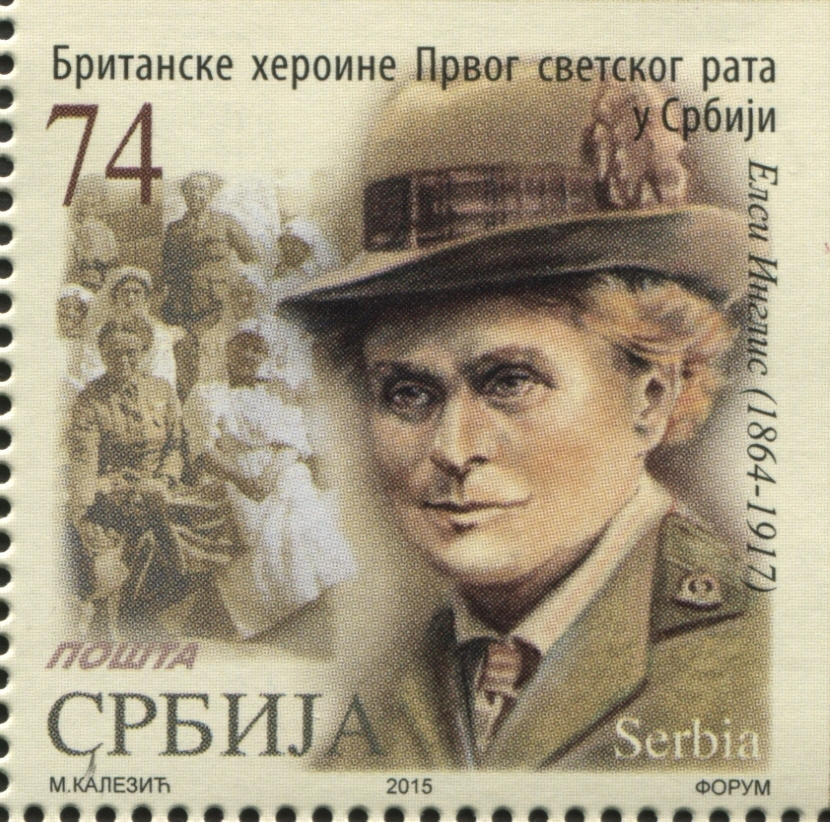
Inglis on a 2015 Serbian stamp

=== Commemorative Stamp ===
In December 2015, the British Embassy in Serbia partnered with the Serbia Post to launch a series of six stamps commemorating "British Heroines of the First World War in Serbia". Elsie Inglis was included in the series along with Captain Flora Sandes, Evelina Haverfield, Elizabeth Ross, Katherine MacPhail and Isabel Emslie Hutton.

== Awards and honours ==
In April 1916, Inglis became the first woman to be awarded the Order of the White Eagle (First class) by the Crown Prince Alexander of Serbia at a ceremony in London. She had previously been awarded the Order of Saint Sava (III class). Her name appears on the screens commemorating the 1,513 women who lost their lives in the First World War as part of the Five Sisters window in York Minster.

== Further information ==
Mary H. J. Henderson, who had helped set up the hospitals and also served with Inglis in Russia, wrote a poem 'In Memoriam: Elsie Maud Inglis', Henderson's poem described Inglis as a heroine.

Gary Mill's 2016 novel My Good Lady is a dramatised account of Inglis's service with the Scottish Women's Hospitals for Foreign Service in the Balkans during World War 1.

The website "My good lady, Elsie Inglis" has many interviews linked to a project by Dr Kamran Qureshi and Dr Iram Qureshi to make a film about Inglis. One of those interviewed was a distant relative of Inglis. The website also includes details of the film producers' visits to Scotland and Serbia, meetings with HRH Crown Prince Alexander

Lothian Health Services Archive holds many records relating to Inglis, as well as a number of her personal possessions. The latter include a case of medical instruments (LHBA 14/37, a Minton coffee cup and saucer (LHBA 14/41) and a beer mug (LHBA 14/38) from Serbia

== See also ==
- People on Scottish banknotes
- Other notable women volunteers in the Scottish Women's Hospitals for Foreign Service
- Women in World War I
- The Serbian campaign (1914–1915)
