= Sarah Mair =

Scottish women's suffragist (1846–1941)

Dame Sarah Mair DBE
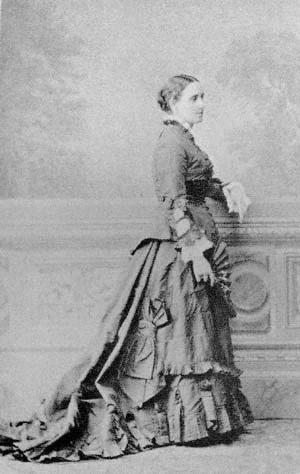
- Sarah Mair, c. 1876
- Born: 23 September 1846; Edinburgh, Scotland
- Died: 13 February 1941 (aged 94); Buckinghamshire, England
- Known for: president of the Ladies' Edinburgh Debating Society
- Relatives: Sarah Siddons (great-grandmother); Henry Siddons (grandfather)

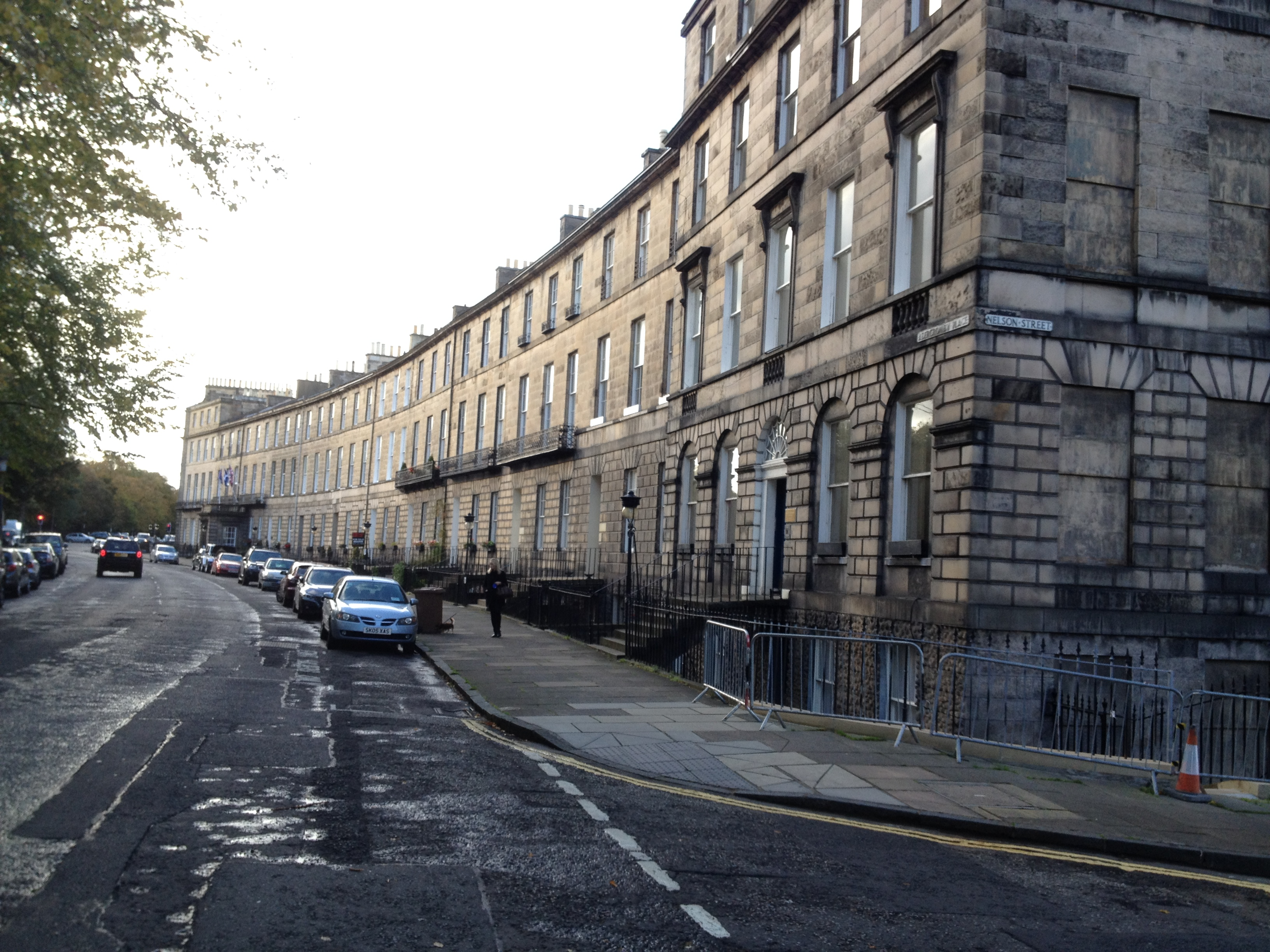
Abercromby Place, Edinburgh

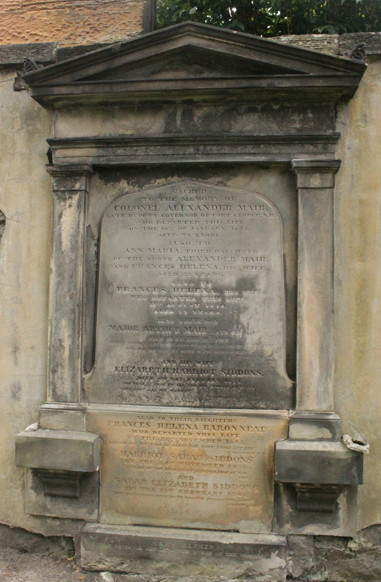
The grave of Sarah Siddons Mair, St Cuthbert's Churchyard, Edinburgh

Dame Sarah Elizabeth Siddons Mair DBE (23 September 1846 – 13 February 1941) was a Scottish campaigner for women's education and women's suffrage. She was active in the Edinburgh Association for the University Education of Women and the Ladies' Edinburgh Debating Society, which she founded before she was 20.

== Life ==
Born into a well-to-do family in Edinburgh, Sarah was the daughter of Major Arthur Mair of the 62nd Regiment and Elizabeth Harriot Mair (née Siddons). She was the granddaughter of actor Henry Siddons and great-granddaughter of actress Sarah Siddons. The family lived at 29 Abercromby Place in Edinburgh's Second New Town.

When Mair was 19, she started the Edinburgh Essay Society, soon renamed the Ladies' Edinburgh Debating Society. She became its president and remained so for 70 years. The society met in the spacious Mair family home in the New Town and offered Edinburgh women of a certain background the chance to discuss social questions, while learning public speaking and debating skills. They published The Attempt, renamed the Ladies' Edinburgh Magazine in 1876, which linked them with readers across the country. It was edited by Mair and Helen Campbell Reid. Charlotte Mary Yonge contributed and Mair reviewed in it Josephine Butler's essay collection Women's Work and Women's Culture.

The society and its headquarters in the Mair dining-room were the focus of much effort to promote women's rights and education, spearheaded by women from usually prosperous professional families. Louisa and Flora Stevenson were early members, as were Louisa Lumsden, founder of St Leonards School in St Andrews, and Charlotte Carmichael, mother of Marie Stopes.

The society debated at intervals the question of women's suffrage, with Mair a lifelong supporter of it. In 1866 and 1872, she found that she and her fellow-suffragists were in the minority, but from 1884 onwards motions in favour of women's suffrage were carried by rising majorities. Mair belonged to the Edinburgh National Society for Women's Suffrage, which had been founded in 1867 as the first Scottish society to campaign for votes for women, and sent speakers to events all over Scotland, including Dr Elsie Inglis, its honorary secretary from 1906. Mair later became its president, and then president of the Scottish Federation of Women's Suffrage Societies. She often managed to mediate between groups with different approaches to campaigning for the vote. Once women over 30 were enfranchised in 1918, she led the Suffrage Society into a new phase as the Society for Equal Citizenship.

Sarah Mair was an important member of the Edinburgh Ladies' Educational Association in 1867, present at the founding meeting, but not considered a founder member, presumably because she was unmarried and rather young. She and Mary Crudelius were willing to take one step at a time towards their goal of equal access to university education for both sexes, with Mair believing a practical approach would bring the right results. However, they ultimately wanted more than a separate system for women, however good the teaching.

In 1876 came an effort to improve women's pre-university education. Classes were offered in St George's Hall to help them gain university entrance, with correspondence courses for those unable to attend. In 1886 she was involved with Mary Russell Walker and others in setting up St George's Training College, followed by St. George's High School for Girls in 1888. The training college was the first Scottish institution to train women to teach in secondary schools and the high school the first Scottish day school for girls that taught them up to university entrance level. Girls from St George's were among the first female graduates of Edinburgh University. Mary Russell Walker returned from London in 1885, qualified to lead the college and later the school.

During the First World War Mair's association with Elsie Inglis, begun as fellow suffragists, continued as she was president of the Hospitals Committee of the Scottish Women's Hospitals for Foreign Service, whose funding was raised from contacts in Edinburgh and beyond. Mair also acted as treasurer of the Edinburgh Association for the University Education of Women's Masson Hall project, and chaired committees of the Bruntsfield Hospital for Women and Children and the Elsie Inglis Memorial Maternity Hospital. She belonged to the Ladies' Chess Club.

== Awards ==
Mair's work for women's education led to an honorary LLD from Edinburgh University in 1920 and a DBE in 1931.

== Remembrance ==
Mair's death at her niece's home in Buckinghamshire was followed by a funeral service in St Mary's Cathedral, Edinburgh. An obituary in The Scotsman called her a "woman pioneer" and a "venerable and notable Edinburgh lady, one who has helped make history in her time." She is remembered also on her paternal family's memorial in St. Cuthbert's Churchyard, Edinburgh.

== See also ==
- List of suffragists and suffragettes

== Sources ==
- Elizabeth Crawford, The Women's Suffrage Movement: A Reference Guide 1866–1928 (Routledge 1999), ISBN 184142031X
