= Aberdeen Ladies' Educational Association =

Ladies' higher education association (1887 – 1893)

The Aberdeen Ladies’ Educational Association (1887 – 1893) was an initiative for the higher education of women in late nineteenth-century Aberdeen.

The Association was one of several associations aimed at improving the higher education of women in Scotland in the late nineteenth century. It was founded in 1887 by a group including local lawyers and businessmen and Lady Christina Alexander Struthers.

The Association established advanced classes given by professors at the University of Aberdeen in 13 different subjects across the sciences and humanities. These classes were taken by 70 – 80 students per year in 1880 – 3.

The Association’s other aim was to campaign for the introduction of local University examinations for both sexes, which had been introduced at the Universities of Edinburgh and St Andrews in the 1860s.

The Association 'proved that women were mentally and physically capable of reaching the standards of male university students,' but it faced several challenges, including the difficulty of drawing enough members in a small town and the work ethic of ladies who had enough leisure time to take up the courses. It discontinued its classes in 1893.

The University of Aberdeen admitted women to its degree courses from 1892.
