= Madeline Daniell =

Scottish educationalist

Madeline Margaret Daniell
- Born: 19 May 1832; Secrole, India
- Died: 21 April 1906 (aged 73); Southsea, England
- Education: Edinburgh Institution for the Education of Young Ladies
- Occupation: educationalist
- Known for: Campaigner for women's right to higher education.
- Spouse: Charles Daniell (m. 1851–1855)
- Children: 1 son

Madeline Margaret Daniell (née Carter) (19 May 1832 – 21 April 1906) was a Scottish educationalist and campaigner for women's rights to higher education.

== Biography ==
Daniell was born on 19 May 1832 in Secrole, India to Helen Gray and Major Henry Carter, of the Bengali native infantry. She was educated at the Edinburgh Institution for the Education of Young Ladies before going on to finishing school in Europe. She married cavalry officer Charles Astell Daniell on 13 November 1851 and together they had a son. Her husband died at Lahore on 24 November 1855.

After her husband's death, she returned to Scotland where she helped establish the Edinburgh Ladies' Educational Association (ELEA), an organisation that provided post-school education for women. In 1866, she hosted the Association's first executive committee meeting at her home on Inverleith Terrace, becoming honorary secretary from 1866 to 1869. In the early years of the Association its president, Mary Crudelius, was often in poor health and Daniell undertook much of the work. In its first year, the Association ran lectures for women on English literature given by the University of Edinburgh's Professor David Masson, and later held classes in physics and mental philosophy. Daniell attended many of the Association's classes.

Daniell left Edinburgh for St Andrews in 1870, to care for her mother. She played a part in the founding of St. Leonard's School for Girls, a school that provided high-quality education to girls and young women prior to their attending university. She was one of the two founding secretaries of the St Andrews School for Girls Company, which established the School.

After her mother's death, Daniell moved to London where she became involved in charity work for impoverished women. While in London she met the philosopher, writer and poet Constance Naden, and in 1887 travelled with her through Europe, Egypt and India. On their return, Daniell lived at Naden's house at Gloucester Square until Naden died in 1889. Daniell wrote the memoir in Naden's posthumous book Induction and Deduction.

After Naden's death Daniell moved to Southport where she was again involved in organisations supporting women's rights including women's suffrage, the Women's Local Government Society, the Southport University Extension Society and the Women's Liberal Association.

Daniell died on 21 April 1906 at her home on Ashburton Road, Southsea after a long, paralysing illness.
