= Mary Crudelius =

British campaigner for women's education

Mary Crudelius (née McLean) (23 February 1839 – 24 July 1877) was a British campaigner for women's education and women's suffrage who lived in Leith, Edinburgh in the 1860s and 1870s. She was a founder of the Edinburgh Association for the University Education of Women.

== Early life ==
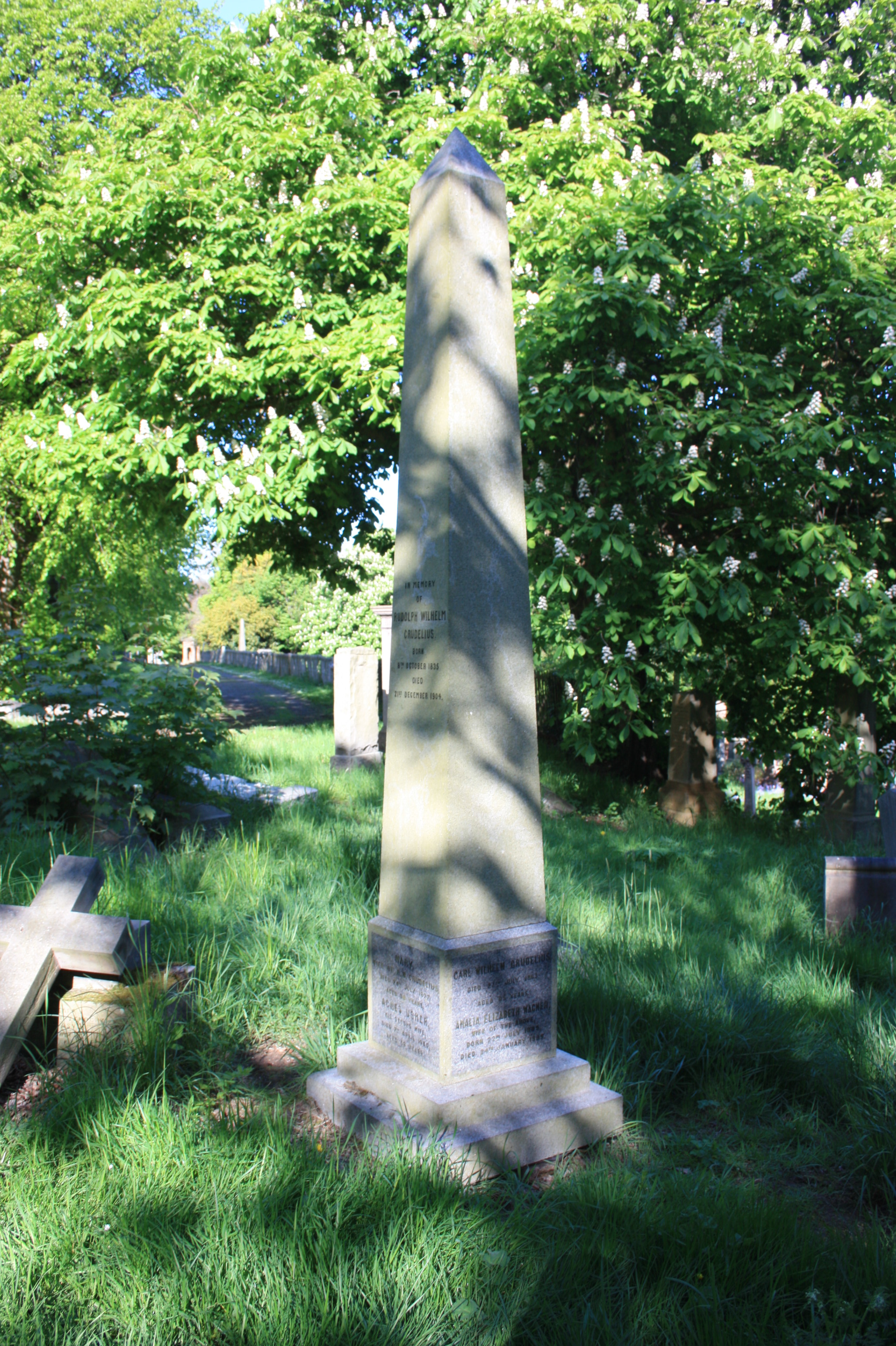
The Crudelius grave, Warriston Cemetery

Crudelius was born Mary McLean in Bury, Lancashire on 23 February 1839 to Mary Alexander and William McLean, both Scots from Dumfriesshire. In the 1850s they sent her to Misses Turnbull's School at 41 Drummond Place, a small Edinburgh female boarding school.

While staying with friends she met her husband Rudolph Wilhelm Crudelius (1835–1904), son of Carl Wilhelm Crudelius (1798–1863), a German wool merchant, and Amalia Elizabeth Wagner (possibly also German). They lived at Jessfield House near Newhaven.

Mary married Rudolph in 1861 and they lived at 7 Laverockbank Terrace in Newhaven (not far from Jessfield). After his father's death, her husband became a partner in the Crudelius and Hirst firm at 7/8 Citadel in Leith. He travelled a great deal on business and Mary wrote him frequent long letters, including discussions of ideas and personal matters. Later she used her abilities as a correspondent to pursue her social and political causes.

== Activism and career ==
In 1866, Crudelius put her name to one of the earliest petitions to Parliament about votes for women. She went on to commit herself to the cause of education for women, starting in 1867 when she spoke out at a ladies' discussion group called the Edinburgh Essay Society. Not long afterwards some of these women, including Crudelius, Madeline Daniell and Sarah Mair, set up the Edinburgh Ladies' Educational Association (ELEA) with the aim of ensuring equal educational opportunities for women.

=== ELEA ===
Crudelius did not want a separate women's college but the admission of women to universities. Nevertheless, she opposed the idea of co-educational classes and went to some trouble to arrange things so as not to attract criticism. Although Sophia Jex-Blake was campaigning during these years for women's medical education alongside men's, the ELEA tried to stay distant, even gaining the support of some of Jex-Blake's enemies. As the group's first secretary, Crudelius was a respected leader and helped steer the association through a few internal disputes and one dispute with the university about details of the plan to offer a university certificate to women passing examinations after attending ELEA lectures.

The association designed its classes according to the university's arts curriculum and to its standards, finding support from several eminent male professors, especially David Masson, who was a strong supporter of Jax-Blake and the Edinburgh Seven, but did not pressure the ELEA to fight for women's admission into British universities, and promoted the Association's objective to provide education for women's "preparing of the mind for the afterlife" rather than for entrance into a profession. 400 women went to Masson's first lecture on English Literature in 1868, with 250 of them staying for the whole series. The certificate was introduced successfully in 1872, though Crudelius hoped there would ultimately be full university degrees for women, but her health had been poor for some time and she did not live to see this happen.

== Death and legacy ==
She died on 24 July 1877 and was buried with her father-in-law and mother-in-law in Warriston Cemetery. The grave lies on the main path from the entrance, where the ground level begins to drop. After her death, Rudolph was remarried to Agnes Usher. When he died, many years later, he was buried with Mary and his parents.

Her death was fifteen years before the first Scottish universities opened their doors to women undergraduates in 1892. Her two daughters, Mary and Maud, were educated through the association in the 1880s and for a few years there was a Crudelius Hall of residence for female students. This was replaced by the Masson Hall in 1897. A Memoir of Mrs. Crudelius was published in 1879 containing some of her letters, poems, and ELEA reports she had written.

Crudelius's granddaughter was Edith Burnet who is known as the first British female architect. There is also a plaque to Crudelius in Bristo Square in Edinburgh.

== Publications ==
- A Memoir of Mary Cornelius (autobiography)
