= Holly Humberstone discography =

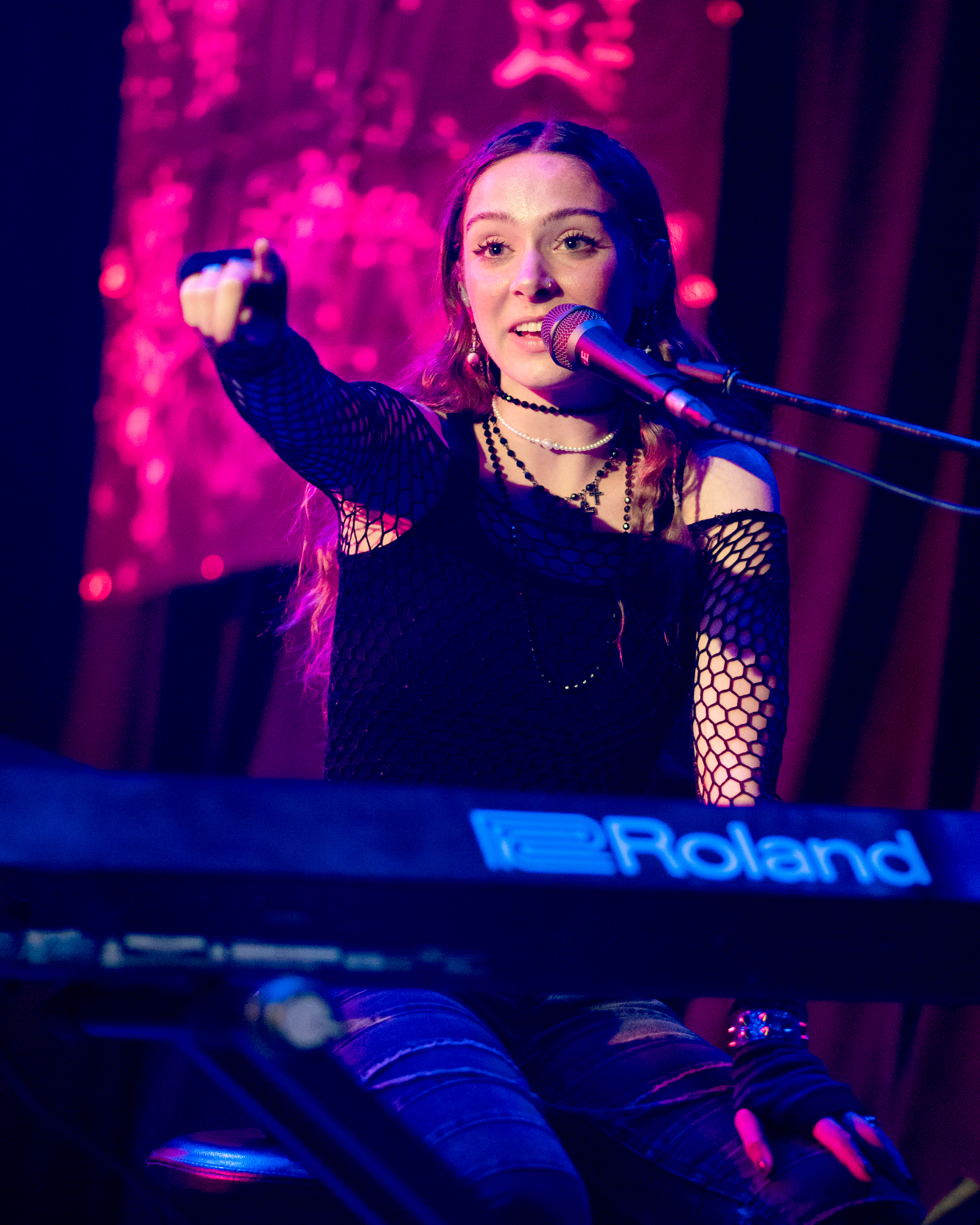
- Humberstone performing in 2021
- Studio albums: 2
- EPs: 4
- Singles: 29
- Compilation albums: 1

The discography of the English singer-songwriter Holly Humberstone consists of two studio albums, one compilation album, four extended plays (EPs) and twenty-nine singles. Humberstone independently released her first single, "Deep End", which was included on her first EP, Falling Asleep at the Wheel (2020). She then signed with Polydor, Darkroom and Interscope Records, as well as a publishing deal with Universal Music Publishing Group. With the labels, she released her second EP, The Walls Are Way Too Thin (2021), which marked her debut on the UK Albums Chart. All of the songs from both EPs were included on a compilation album, Can You Afford to Lose Me?.

In late 2023, Humberstone released her debut album, Paint My Bedroom Black. It debuted at number five on the UK Albums Chart. In 2024, as opposed to releasing a deluxe edition of the album, she released an EP with old songs she had forgotten about, titled Work in Progress. Her second studio album, Cruel World, was released on 10 April 2026. They were preceded by the singles "Die Happy", "To Love Somebody" and "Cruel World". It was later accompanied by It's a Real Cruel World (2026), an EP composed of reimagined versions of select songs.

== Studio albums ==
List of studio albums, with selected details and chart positions
Title	Details	Peak chart positions					
Title	Details	UK	AUS	AUT	BEL (FL)	GER	SCO
Paint My Bedroom Black	Released: 13 October 2023; Label: Polydor, Darkroom, Geffen; Formats: Cassette, CD, digital download, streaming, vinyl	5	— (Note: Paint My Bedroom Black did not enter the ARIA Album chart, but did peak at number 15 on the Australia Hitseekers Albums chart.)	—	94	—	3
Cruel World	Released: 10 April 2026; Label: Polydor; Formats: Cassette, CD, digital download, streaming, vinyl	4	18	65	49	46	2

== Compilation albums ==
List of compilation albums, with selected chart positions
Title	Details	Peak chart positions	
Title	Details	UK Sales	SCO
Can You Afford to Lose Me?	Released: 24 October 2022; Label: Polydor, Darkroom, Geffen; Formats: Cassette, CD, digital download, streaming, vinyl	41	39

== Extended plays ==
List of extended plays, with selected chart positions
Title	Details	Peak chart positions	
Title	Details	UK	SCO
Falling Asleep at the Wheel	Released: 14 August 2020; Label: Platoon; Formats: Digital download, streaming	—	—
The Walls Are Way Too Thin	Released: 12 November 2021; Label: Polydor, Darkroom, Interscope; Formats: Cassette, CD, digital download, streaming, vinyl	64	35
Work in Progress	Released: 15 March 2024; Label: Polydor, Darkroom, Geffen; Formats: Cassette, CD, digital download, streaming, vinyl	—	—
It's a Real Cruel World	Released: 5 June 2026; Label: Polydor; Formats: Digital download, streaming	—	—
"—" denotes a recording that did not chart or was not released in that territory.

== Singles ==
List of singles, with year released, selected chart positions, and album name shown
Title	Year	Peak chart positions										Certifications	Album
Title	Year	UK Sales	AUT Air.	GER	GER Air.	JPN Hot. Over.	LAT Air. (Note: Both Latvian Music Producers Association and TopHit provides airplay charts for Latvia. Since 2023, LaIPA airplay chart has only 20 positions, for this reason the peaks below Top 20 are taken from TopHit Latvian airplay chart.)	LTU Air.	NZ Hot	SLO Air.	SWI Air.	Certifications	Album
"Deep End"	2020	—	—	—	—	—	—	—	—	—	—		Falling Asleep at the Wheel
"Falling Asleep at the Wheel"	2020	—	—	—	—	—	—	—	—	—	—	BPI: Silver	Falling Asleep at the Wheel
"Overkill"	2020	—	—	—	—	—	—	—	—	—	—		Falling Asleep at the Wheel
"Fake Plastic Trees"	2020	—	—	—	—	—	—	—	—	—	—		Non-album single
"Drop Dead"	2020	—	—	—	—	—	—	—	35	—	—		Falling Asleep at the Wheel
"Vanilla"	2020	—	—	—	—	—	—	—	—	—	—		Falling Asleep at the Wheel
"Haunted House"	2021	—	—	—	—	—	—	—	—	—	—		The Walls Are Way Too Thin
"The Walls Are Way Too Thin"	2021	26	—	—	—	—	—	—	—	—	—		The Walls Are Way Too Thin
"Please Don't Leave Just Yet"	2021	—	—	—	—	—	—	—	—	—	—		The Walls Are Way Too Thin
"Scarlett"	2021	35	—	—	—	—	—	—	—	—	86		The Walls Are Way Too Thin
"Friendly Fire"	2021	—	—	—	—	—	—	—	—	—	—		The Walls Are Way Too Thin
"Seventeen Going Under" (acoustic version with Sam Fender)	2021	—	—	—	—	—	—	—	—	—	—		Non-album singles
"London Is Lonely"	2022	41	—	—	—	—	—	—	—	—	—		Non-album singles
"I Would Die 4 U"	2022	—	—	—	—	—	—	—	—	—	—		Non-album singles
"Sleep Tight"	2022	—	—	—	—	—	—	—	—	—	—		Non-album singles
"Can You Afford to Lose Me?"	2022	—	—	—	—	—	—	—	—	—	—		Can You Afford to Lose Me?
"Antichrist"	2023	—	—	—	—	—	—	—	—	—	—		Paint My Bedroom Black
"Room Service"	2023	—	—	—	—	—	—	—	—	—	—		Paint My Bedroom Black
"Superbloodmoon" (featuring D4vd)	2023	—	—	—	—	—	—	—	—	—	—		Paint My Bedroom Black
"Into Your Room" (solo or with Muna)	2023	—	—	—	—	—	—	—	—	—	—		Paint My Bedroom Black
"Kissing in Swimming Pools"	2023	—	—	—	—	—	—	—	—	—	—		Paint My Bedroom Black
"Paint My Bedroom Black"	2023	—	—	—	—	—	—	—	—	—	—		Paint My Bedroom Black
"Cigarettes & Wine" (featuring Del Water Gap)	2024	—	—	—	—	—	—	—	—	—	—		Non-album single
"Dive" (duet version with Asha Banks)	2024	—	—	—	—	—	—	—	—	—	—		Work in Progress
"Work in Progress"	2024	19	—	—	—	—	—	—	—	—	—		Work in Progress
"Die Happy"	2025	—	—	—	—	—	—	—	—	—	—		Cruel World
"To Love Somebody"	2026	—	3	99	1	—	12	21	16	12	16		Cruel World
"Cruel World"	2026	—	—	—	—	18	23	—	—	—	—		Cruel World
"Beauty Pageant"	2026	—	—	—	—	—	—	—	—	—	—		Cruel World
"Too Cute to Be Lonely"	2026	—	—	—	—	13	—	—	—	—	—		Cruel World... So It Ends
"Killing the Mood"	2026	—	—	—	—	—	—	—	34	—	—		Cruel World... So It Ends
"—" denotes a recording that did not chart or was not released in that territory.

== Other charted songs ==
List of other charted songs, with selected chart positions
Title	Year	Peak chart positions		Album
Title	Year	EST Air.	LAT Air.	Album
"White Noise"	2026	80	12	Cruel World

== See also ==
- List of songs recorded by Holly Humberstone
