= List of songs recorded by Holly Humberstone =

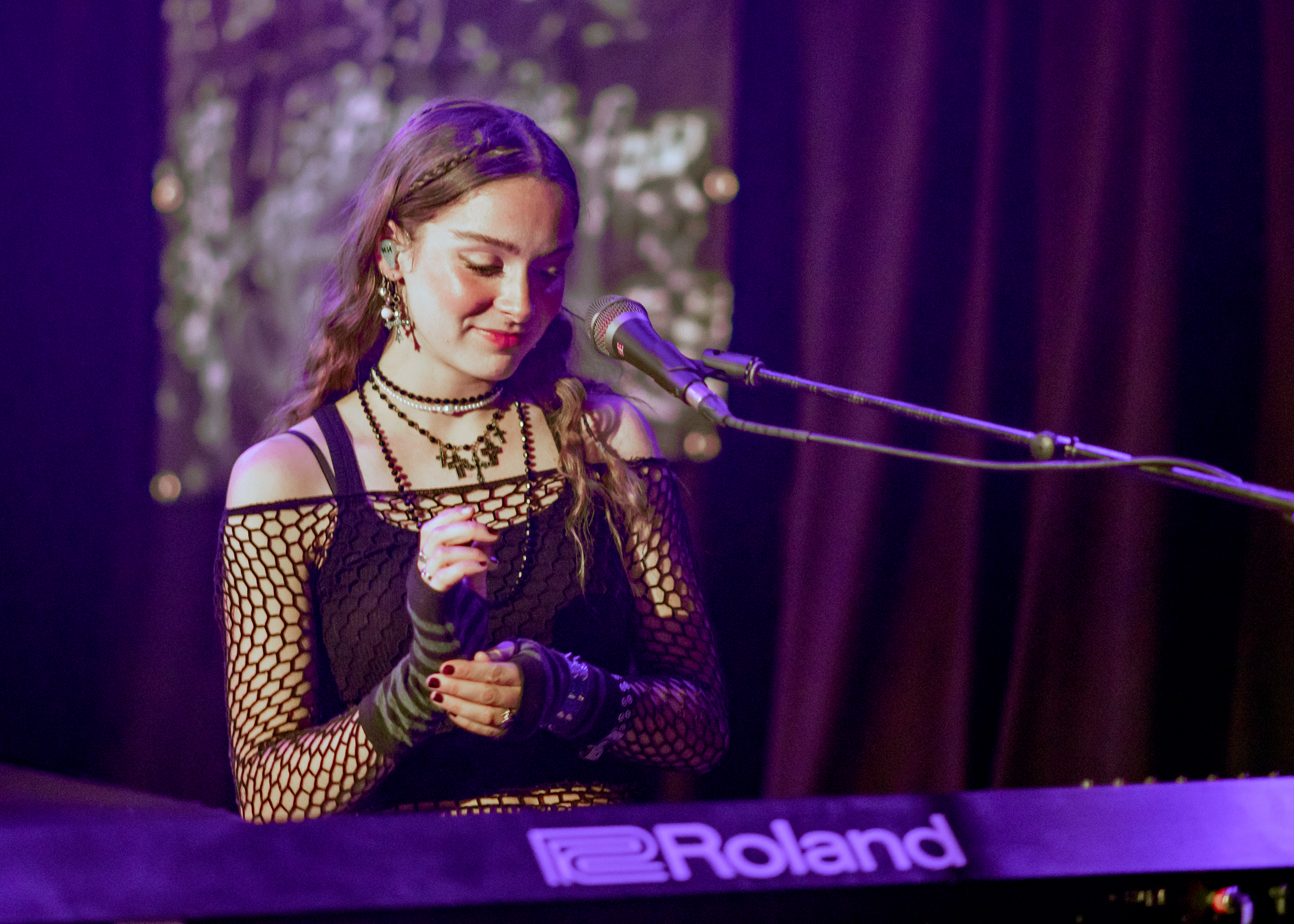
Humberstone performing in 2021

English singer-songwriter Holly Humberstone's professional music career began in 2020, when she independently released her first single, "Deep End". It was included on her first EP, Falling Asleep at the Wheel (2020). She then signed with Polydor, Darkroom and Interscope Records, as well as attaining a publishing deal with Universal Music Publishing Group. With the labels, she released her second EP, The Walls Are Way Too Thin (2021), which marked her debut on the UK Albums Chart. All of the songs from both EPs were included on a compilation album, Can You Afford to Lose Me?.

In late 2023, Humberstone released her debut album, Paint My Bedroom Black. In 2024, as opposed to releasing a deluxe edition of the album, she released an EP with tracks that did not make the final track listing for the album, titled Work in Progress. Her second studio album, Cruel World, was released on 10 April 2026. They were preceded by the singles "Die Happy", "To Love Somebody" and "Cruel World". Two months after the album, Humberstone released It's a Real Cruel World, an EP composed of four reimagined songs from Cruel World.

== Songs ==
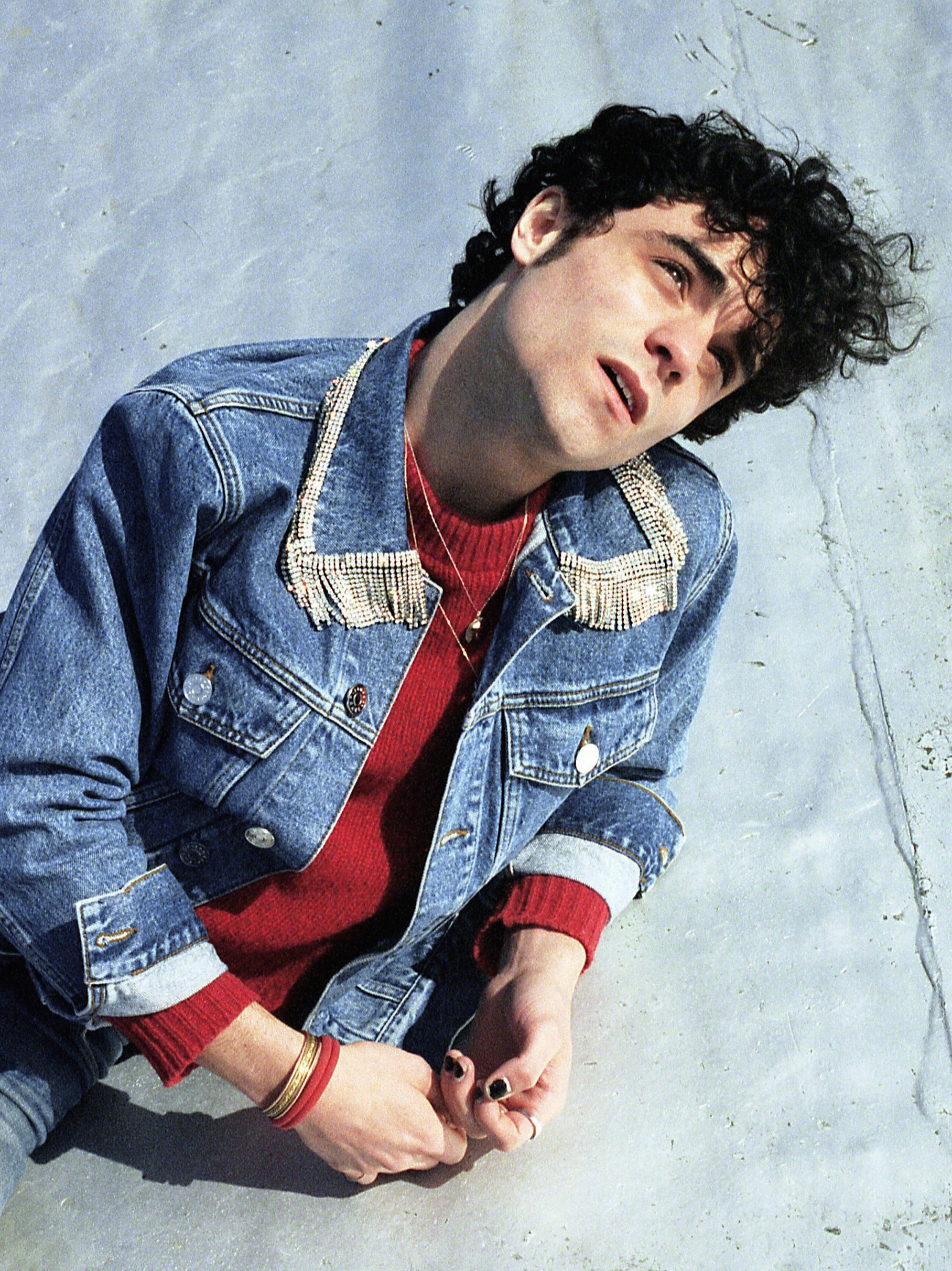
Humberstone featured on Del Water Gap's 2024 song "Cigarettes & Wine".

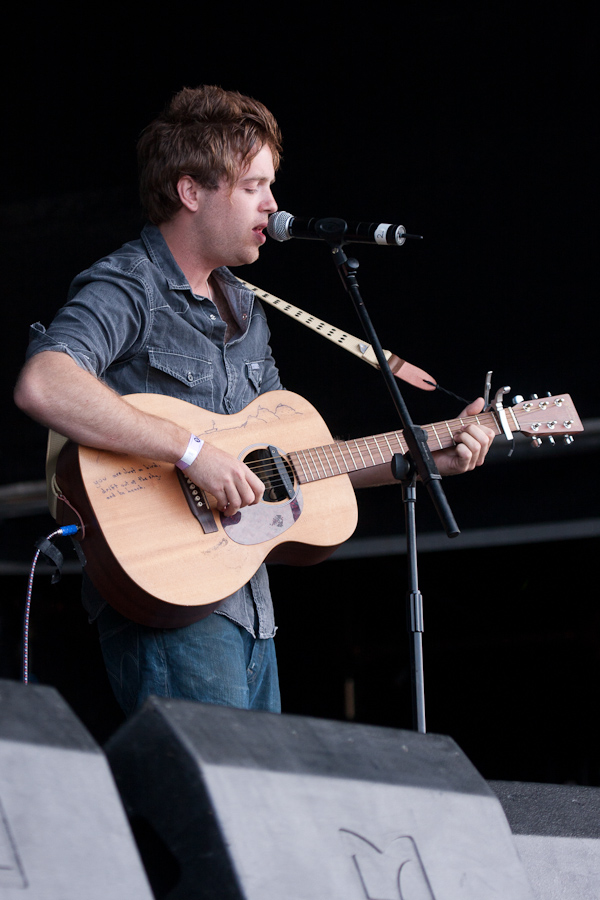
Benjamin Francis Leftwich is a frequent collaborator for Humberstone.

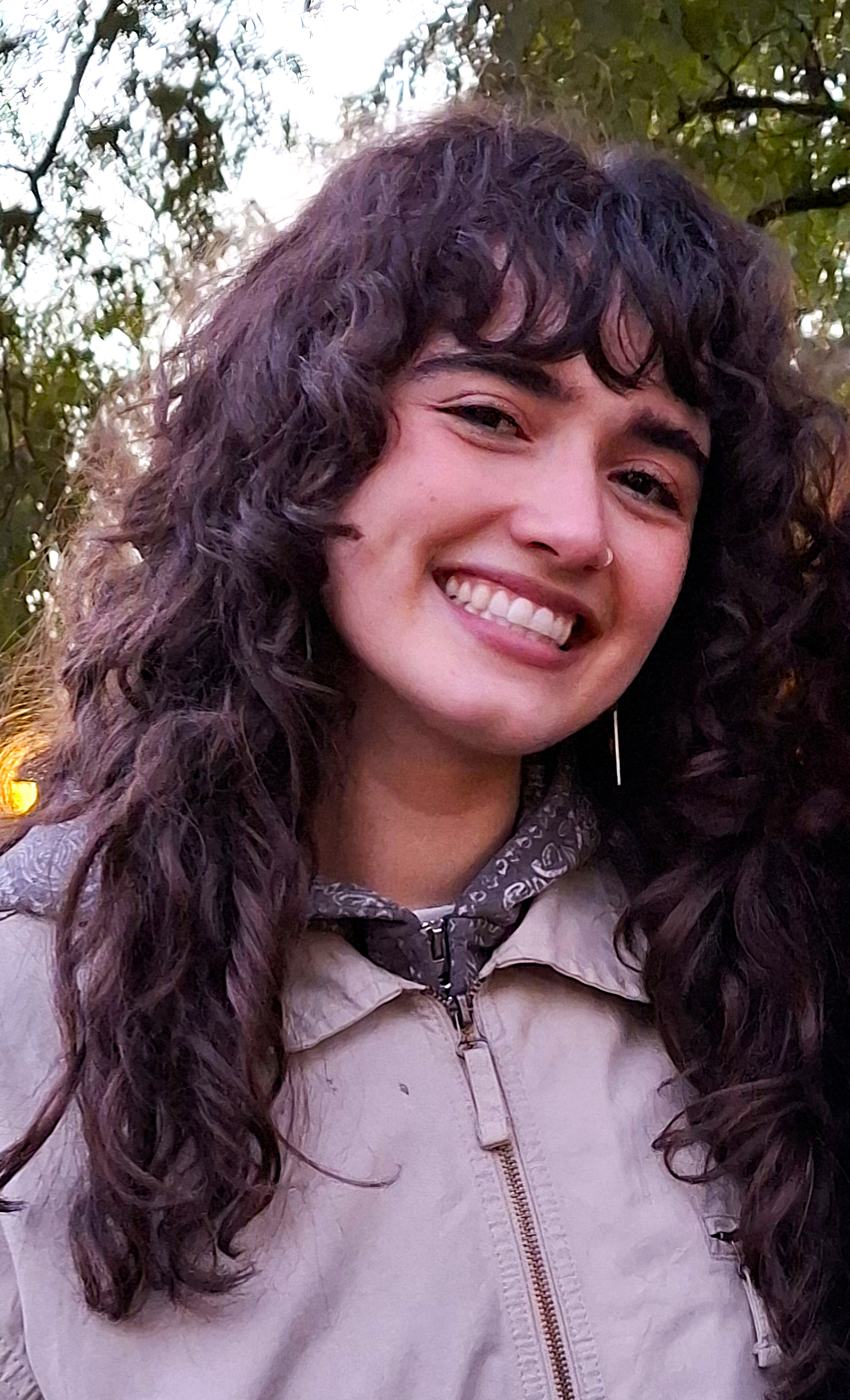
Asha Banks featured on a remix of "Dive" with Humberstone.

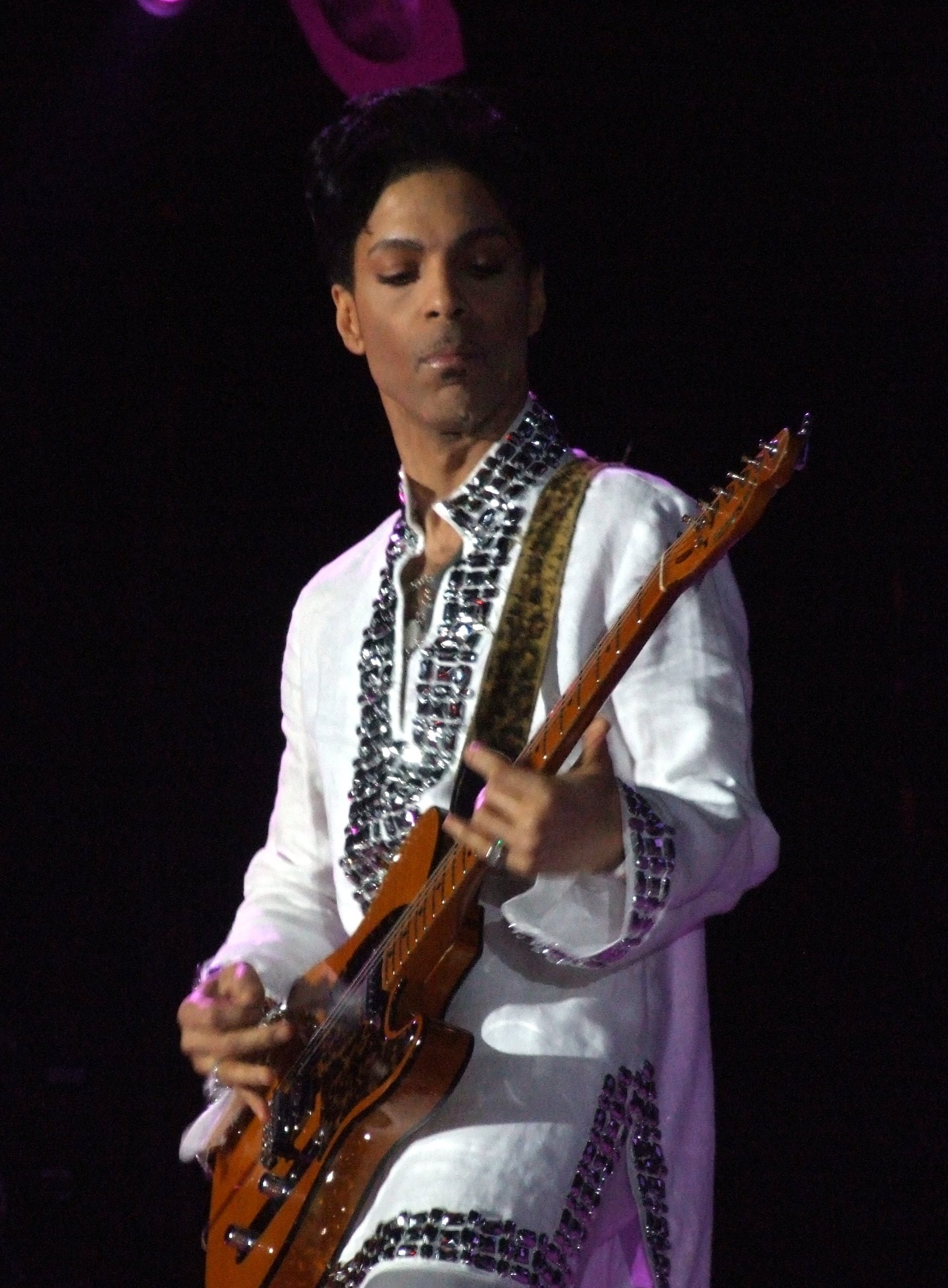
Humberstone covered Prince and the Revolution's "I Would Die 4 U" in 2022.

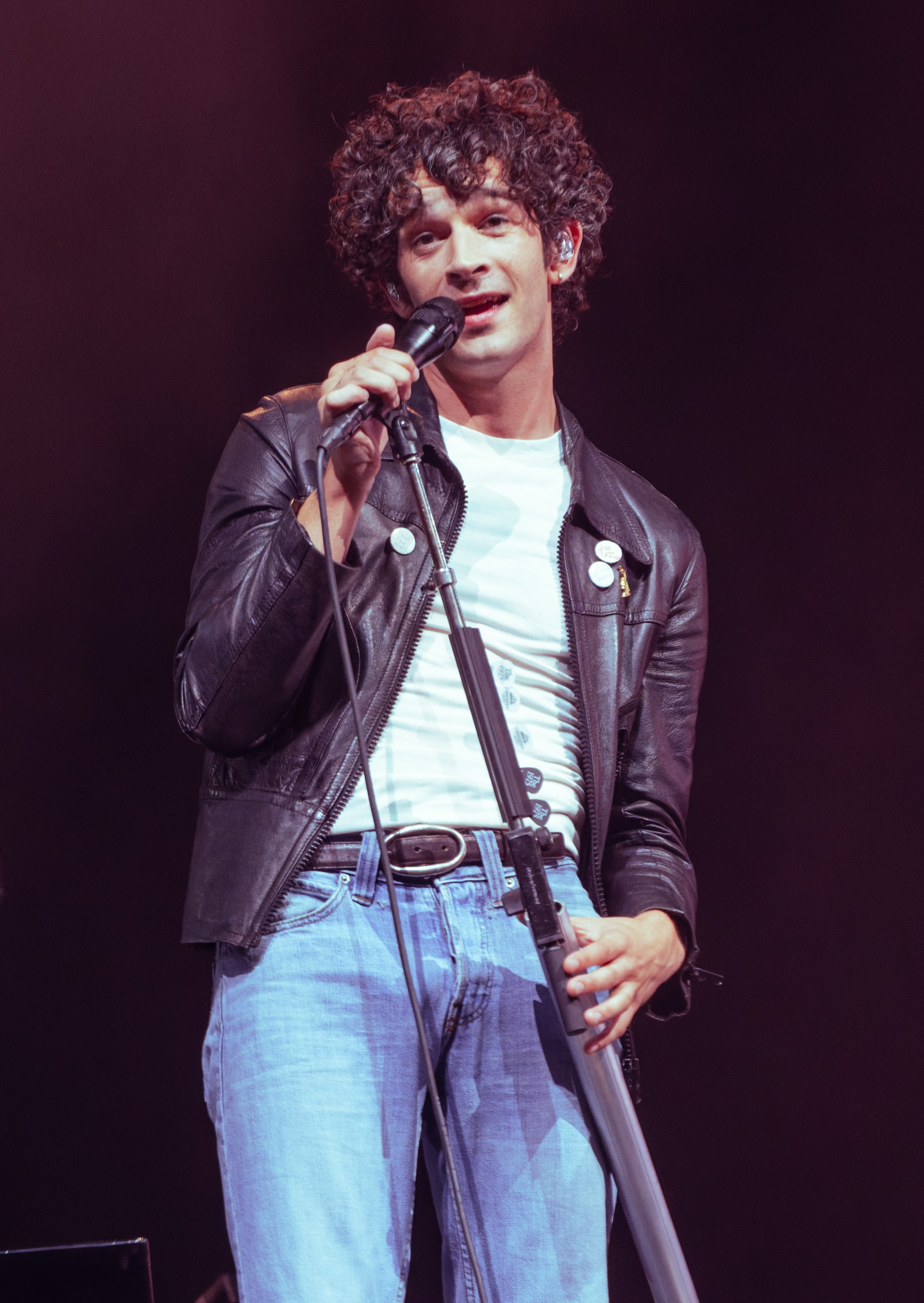
Matty Healy co-wrote two tracks with Humberstone.

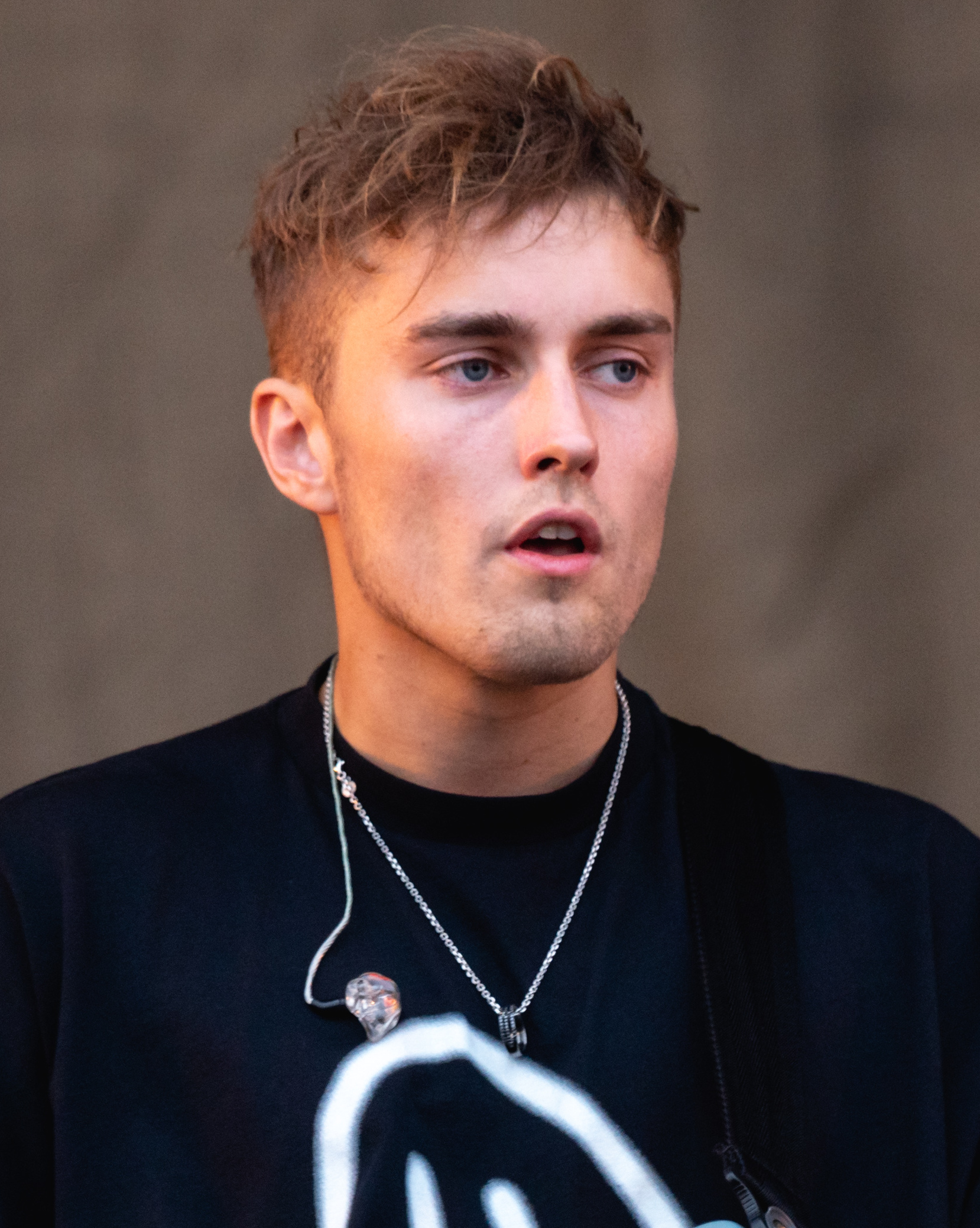
Humberstone featured on an acoustic version of Sam Fender's 2021 single "Seventeen Going Under".

Key
‡	Indicates a single release
‡	Indicates song is a cover of another artist's previous work

Name of song, songwriter(s), originating album and year of release
Song	Artist(s)	Songwriter(s)	Originating album	Year	Ref.
"22 (Over Soon)" (originally by Bon Iver)	Holly Humberstone	Justin Vernon	Apple Music Home Session: Holly Humberstone	2020	
"Antichrist"	Holly Humberstone	Holly Ffion Humberstone; Ines Dunn; Rob Milton	Paint My Bedroom Black	2023	
"At Least You Got to Love Somebody"	Holly Humberstone	Holly Ffion Humberstone; Rob Milton; Jon Green	It's a Real Cruel World	2026	
"Baby Blues"	Holly Humberstone	Holly Ffion Humberstone; Rob Milton; Giampaolo Parisi; Marco Parisi	Paint My Bedroom Black	2023	
"Back in Your Red Chevy"	Holly Humberstone	Holly Ffion Humberstone; Rob Milton	It's a Real Cruel World	2026	
"Beauty Pageant"	Holly Humberstone	Holly Ffion Humberstone; Rob Milton; Benjamin Francis Leftwich; Michel Bernholc; Eddie George; Jean Paul Dréau; Matt Zara	Cruel World	2026	
"Blue Dream"	Holly Humberstone	Holly Ffion Humberstone; Rob Milton	Cruel World	2026	
"Can You Afford to Lose Me?"	Holly Humberstone	Holly Ffion Humberstone; Rob Milton	Can You Afford to Lose Me?	2022	
"Cigarettes & Wine"	Del Water Gap featuring Holly Humberstone	Holly Ffion Humberstone; Rob Milton; S. Holden Jaffe; Scott Harris	Non-album single	2024	
"Cocoon"	Holly Humberstone	Holly Ffion Humberstone; Rob Milton	Paint My Bedroom Black	2023	
"Cruel World"	Holly Humberstone	Holly Ffion Humberstone; Rob Milton; Benjamin Francis Leftwich	Cruel World	2026	
"Deep End"	Holly Humberstone	Holly Ffion Humberstone; Rob Milton; Benjamin Francis Leftwich	Falling Asleep at the Wheel	2020	
"Die Happy"	Holly Humberstone	Holly Ffion Humberstone; Rob Milton; Nate Campany	Cruel World	2025	
"Dive"	Holly Humberstone	Holly Ffion Humberstone; Rob Milton	Work in Progress	2024	
"Dive"	Holly Humberstone and Asha Banks	Holly Ffion Humberstone; Rob Milton	Non-album single	2024	
"Diving"	Bombay Bicycle Club featuring Holly Humberstone	Jack Steadman	My Big Day	2023	
"Down Swinging"	Holly Humberstone	Holly Ffion Humberstone; Benjamin Francis Leftwich; Rob Milton	Work in Progress	2024	
"Drop Dead"	Holly Humberstone	Holly Ffion Humberstone; Sophie Frances Cooke	Falling Asleep at the Wheel	2020	
"Drunk Dialling"	Holly Humberstone	Holly Ffion Humberstone; Rob Milton	Cruel World	2026	
"Easy Does It"	Holly Humberstone	Holly Ffion Humberstone; Rob Milton	Paint My Bedroom Black	2023	
"Easy Tiger"	Holly Humberstone	Holly Ffion Humberstone; Rob Milton	Work in Progress	2024	
"Elvis Impersonators"	Holly Humberstone	Holly Ffion Humberstone; Noah Conrad; Rob Milton; Jonah Summerfield	Paint My Bedroom Black	2023	
"Embers in the Sky"	Holly Humberstone	Holly Ffion Humberstone	Life Is Strange: Reunion	2026	
"Fake Plastic Trees" (originally by Radiohead)	Holly Humberstone	Radiohead	Non-album single	2020	
"Falling Asleep at the Wheel"	Holly Humberstone	Holly Ffion Humberstone; Rob Milton	Falling Asleep at the Wheel	2020	
"Flatlining"	Holly Humberstone	Holly Ffion Humberstone; Noah Conrad; Rob Milton; Jonah Summerfield	Paint My Bedroom Black	2023	
"Friendly Fire"	Holly Humberstone	Holly Ffion Humberstone; Rob Milton; Benjamin Francis Leftwich	The Walls Are Way Too Thin	2021	
"Ghost Me"	Holly Humberstone	Holly Ffion Humberstone; Benjamin Francis Leftwich; Rob Milton	Paint My Bedroom Black	2023	
"Girl"	Holly Humberstone	Holly Ffion Humberstone; Noah Conrad; Rob Milton; Jonah Summerfield	Paint My Bedroom Black	2023	
"Haunted House"	Holly Humberstone	Holly Ffion Humberstone; Rob Milton; Sarah Aarons	The Walls Are Way Too Thin	2021	
"Into Your Room"	Holly Humberstone	Holly Ffion Humberstone; Ethan Gruska; Rob Milton	Paint My Bedroom Black	2023	
"Into Your Room"	Holly Humberstone and Muna	Holly Ffion Humberstone; Ethan Gruska; Rob Milton	Non-album single	2023	
"It's a Real Cruel World"	Holly Humberstone	Holly Ffion Humberstone; Rob Milton; Benjamin Francis Leftwich	It's a Real Cruel World	2026	
"It's Just White Noise"	Holly Humberstone	Holly Ffion Humberstone; Rob Milton; Jon Green; Mikky Ekko	It's a Real Cruel World	2026	
"I Would Die 4 U" (originally by Prince and the Revolution)	Holly Humberstone	Prince	Non-album single	2022	
"Kissing in Swimming Pools"	Holly Humberstone	Holly Ffion Humberstone; Rob Milton	Paint My Bedroom Black	2023	
"Lauren"	Holly Humberstone	Holly Ffion Humberstone; Ethan Gruska; Rob Milton	Paint My Bedroom Black	2023	
"Livewire"	Holly Humberstone	Holly Ffion Humberstone; Rob Milton	Falling Asleep at the Wheel	2020	
"London Is Lonely"	Holly Humberstone	Holly Ffion Humberstone	Non-album single	2022	
"Lucy"	Holly Humberstone	Holly Ffion Humberstone; Rob Milton; Ilsey Juber	Cruel World	2026	
"Make It All Better"	Holly Humberstone	Holly Ffion Humberstone; Rob Milton	Cruel World	2026	
"Miss You to Death"	Holly Humberstone	Holly Ffion Humberstone; Rob Milton; Benjamin Francis Leftwich	The Buccaneers: S2	2025	
"Overkill"	Holly Humberstone	Holly Ffion Humberstone; Rob Milton; Benjamin Francis Leftwich	Falling Asleep at the Wheel	2020	
"Peachy"	Holly Humberstone	Holly Ffion Humberstone; Rob Milton; Jake Greene; Jon Green	Cruel World	2026	
"Please Don't Leave Just Yet"	Holly Humberstone	Holly Ffion Humberstone; Rob Milton; Matthew Healy	The Walls Are Way Too Thin	2021	
"Red Chevy"	Holly Humberstone	Holly Ffion Humberstone; Rob Milton	Cruel World	2026	
"Roadside Flowers"	Holly Humberstone	Holly Ffion Humberstone; Rob Milton; Jonny Coffer	Paint My Bedroom Black	2023	
"Room Service"	Holly Humberstone	Holly Ffion Humberstone; Rob Milton	Paint My Bedroom Black	2023	
"Scarlett"	Holly Humberstone	Holly Ffion Humberstone; Rob Milton	The Walls Are Way Too Thin	2021	
"Seventeen Going Under"	Sam Fender and Holly Humberstone	Sam Fender	Non-album single	2021	
"Sleep Tight"	Holly Humberstone	Holly Ffion Humberstone; Rob Milton; Matthew Healy	Non-album single	2022	
"So It Starts..."	Holly Humberstone	Holly Ffion Humberstone; Rob Milton; Nate Campany	Cruel World	2026	
"Superbloodmoon"	Holly Humberstone featuring D4vd	Holly Ffion Humberstone; David Burke; Scott Harris; Rob Milton	Paint My Bedroom Black	2023	
"Thursday"	Holly Humberstone	Holly Ffion Humberstone; Rob Milton	The Walls Are Way Too Thin	2021	
"To Love Somebody"	Holly Humberstone	Holly Ffion Humberstone; Rob Milton; Jon Green	Cruel World	2026	
"Too Cute to Be Lonely"	Holly Humberstone	Holly Ffion Humberstone; Rob Milton; JT Daly; Benjamin Francis Leftwich	Cruel World... So It Ends	2026	
"Vanilla"	Holly Humberstone	Holly Ffion Humberstone; Rob Milton	Falling Asleep at the Wheel	2020	
"The Walls Are Way Too Thin"	Holly Humberstone	Holly Ffion Humberstone; Rob Milton	The Walls Are Way Too Thin	2021	
"White Noise"	Holly Humberstone	Holly Ffion Humberstone; Rob Milton; Jon Green; Mikky Ekko	Cruel World	2026	
"Work in Progress"	Holly Humberstone	Holly Ffion Humberstone; Rob Milton; William Taylor	Work in Progress	2024	
