= Cruel World (album) =

Studio album by Holly Humberstone
- Released: 10 April 2026
- Recorded: 2023–2025
- Genre: Pop
- Length: 38:30
- Label: Polydor
- Producer: Rob Milton

Holly Humberstone chronology
Work in Progress (2024)	Cruel World (2026)	It's a Real Cruel World (2026)

Singles from Cruel World
- 1. "Die Happy" Released: 5 November 2025; 2. "To Love Somebody" Released: 23 January 2026; 3. "Cruel World" Released: 13 March 2026; 4. "Beauty Pageant" Released: 10 April 2026

Singles from Cruel World... So It Ends
- 1. "Too Cute to Be Lonely" Released: 30 September 2026; 2. "Killing the Mood" Released: 13 November 2026

Cruel World is the second studio album by English singer-songwriter Holly Humberstone. It was released on 10 April 2026 through Polydor Records, following the release of her debut studio album, Paint My Bedroom Black (2023). Cruel World was preceded by the release of three singles: "Die Happy", "To Love Somebody" and titular track "Cruel World". The fourth single, "Beauty Pageant", was released alongside the album.

Cruel World features a sonic and thematic departure from Paint My Bedroom Black, transitioning into an upbeat pop sound; in addition to dissecting themes of belonging, steadiness, repair and discipline. Upon its release, the album received generally positive reviews from music critics, with praise for its production and Humberstone's songwriting. Humberstone later released It's a Real Cruel World, a complimentary extended play composed of reimagined versions of select songs. Later that year, Humberstone announced a deluxe version of the album, Cruel World... So It Ends, which was released on 13 November 2026

== Background ==
Following various project releases including Falling Asleep at the Wheel (2020) and The Walls Are Way Too Thin (2021), Humberstone won the Brit Award for Rising Star in 2022. She released her debut album, Paint My Bedroom Black, in 2023, as well as supporting Olivia Rodrigo on the Sour Tour. In 2024, she released the EP Work in Progress. It was composed of songs not included on Paint My Bedroom Black as opposed to releasing a typical deluxe edition. 2024 also saw her supporting Taylor Swift on The Eras Tour at Wembley Stadium.

In mid-2025, Humberstone returned to musical releases with a contribution to the soundtrack for The Buccaneers, the song "Miss You to Death". Months later, she confirmed that a "new world" was beginning, hinting towards the start of a new album cycle. Humberstone stated that she wrote the album with a "new discipline", attending daily studio sessions with long-term collaborator Rob Milton.

== Promotion and release ==
"Die Happy" was released in November 2025 as the lead single from Cruel World. A visualiser was released alongside it, directed by Silken Weinberg. A headline tour throughout the UK and Europe was also announced, as well as confirmation that Humberstone would support Sam Fender on the Australian leg of his tour; the two previously collaborated in 2021 on a remix of Fender's song "Seventeen Going Under". "To Love Somebody" served as the second single and was released on 23 January 2026. It was again released alongside a visualiser directed by Weinberg, inspired by Victorian theater, the Brothers Grimm and Nosferatu. On the day of its release, she performed "To Love Somebody" on The Tonight Show Starring Jimmy Fallon. That same day, she announced Cruel World's release date as 10 April 2026. A North American tour was later announced in promotion of the album. The third single from the album was "Cruel World"; the titular track. It was released on 13 March 2026, with "Beauty Pageant" released as the fourth single that same day. In June, Humberstone released It's a Real Cruel World, an EP composed of four reimagined versions of "White Noise", "To Love Somebody", "Red Chevy" and "Cruel World".

On 30 September 2026, Humberstone announced a deluxe version of the album, Cruel World... So It Ends, which was released on 13 November 2026. In addition, she also released the first single from the deluxe, "Too Cute to Be Lonely", which also featured a music video directed by Weinberg.

== Composition and lyrics ==
Paint My Bedroom Black, Humberstone's debut album, dealt with themes of turbulence, anxiety and displacement. Cruel World features a shift in theme as it dissects the feeling of belonging, steadiness, repair and discipline. Humberstone had spent years living out of suitcases and staying in hotel rooms, but during the process of making Cruel World, she found a permanent living situation. She felt she had rebuilt "both her physical space and her emotional center" and that music had become her anchor. She also felt completely in control of the record and felt that she could look back on the album in years to come and still feel proud of it. When asked if Cruel World had a scent, Humberstone said: "it would be unisex, not too feminine. It would have a dusky rose, tobacco, because I like my ciggies, and dusty old library books".

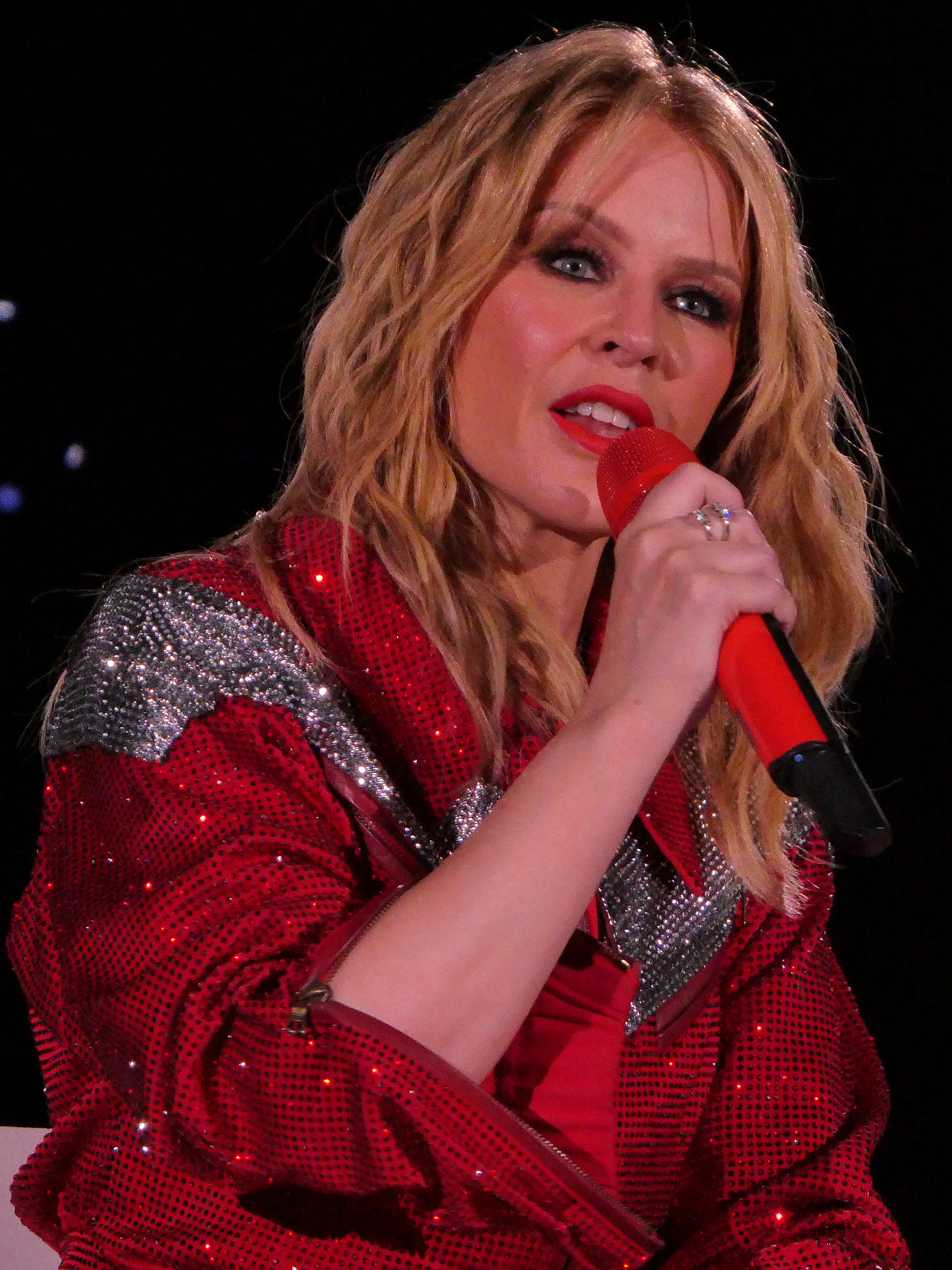
"White Noise" was compared to songs by Kylie Minogue.

Cruel World begins with "So It Starts..." an instrumental introductory track that mimics the sounds of an orchestra readying for a performance. "Make It All Better" follows an alt pop song featuring an "electronic crescendo". Its lyrical content is centred around Humberstone soothing her partner's nightmares and the idea of growing old together in matching tracksuits. "To Love Somebody", the third song from the album, is a "confessional and boldly vulnerable pop track". It explores holding onto the silver lining of a doomed relationship. Co-written with Rob Milton and Jon Green, Humberstone wanted to capture the contradiction of love involving hurting and losing someone, but "at least you got to love somebody". They wrote it after Humberstone was inspired by a friend's "brutal breakup" that she witnessed. The fourth and titular track, "Cruel World", dissects a long-distance relationship and Humberstone's distorted perception of the world since her partner is not nearby.

The fifth track on Cruel World, "Die Happy", is a "gothic love song". The track was inspired by The Bloody Chamber and Dracula and Humberstone wanted to convey the danger of love, especially the "feeling of throwing yourself into love fully and recklessly". "White Noise" follows and was compared to works by Kylie Minogue and the Weeknd, with it described as "naff disco". It sees Humberstone sing about wanting to go to a nightclub to "numb the sting" of a heartbreak.

The seventh song, "Lucy", is an acoustic song that includes commentary about femininity. Its lyrics see Humberstone offer reassurance to girls her age that life gets better after pain. The ninth song, "Drunk Dialling", features a "huge, festival-ready, lighters-in-the-air style chorus" and references the concept of drunk dialing an ex since she feels she has nothing left to lose. In an interview with InStyle, Humberstone spoke about the closing track, titled "Beauty Pageant", which she billed her most vulnerable song to date. The lyrics explore her attitude towards women following growing up with three sisters, going to an all-girls school, then going straight into the music industry. She had realised she had toxic thought patterns of viewing other women as competition; she wrote "Beauty Pageant" about the "unrealistic expectations girls hold [themselves] to and trying to navigate this world that isn't built for [them]—pressures of being pretty, appearing busy and hard working, getting all of [their] validation from social media". She found the lyrics embarrassing to admit, but hoped people would relate to the "human element".

== Critical reception ==
Metacritic review
breakdown (unweighted)

Positive
7 (78%)
Mixed
2 (22%)
Negative
0 (0%)

Professional ratings
Aggregate scores
Source	Rating
AnyDecentMusic?	7.8/10
Metacritic	80/100
Review scores
Source	Rating
DIY	4/5 stars
The Guardian	4/5 stars
Rolling Stone UK	5/5 stars
Under the Radar	8.5/10
The Line of Best Fit	6/10

According to the review aggregator Metacritic, Cruel World received "generally favorable reviews" based on a weighted average score of 80 out of 100 from nine critic scores. The review aggregator Any Decent Music gave the album a weighted average score of 7.8 out of 10 from 14 critic scores.

Rachel Aroesti, writing for The Guardian, said that with its release, Humberstone had managed to cement herself in the pop music scene despite not having a large presence on the music charts. She appreciated the production of the album as well as the majority of Humberstone's lyricism; she did however note that the album suffered "the odd cringeworthy line". Aroesti concluded her review by stating that she could see a long career for Humberstone as a pop star.

Will Richards, writing for Rolling Stone, awarded the album five stars out of a possible five. He appreciated the well-travelled stories told throughout, feeling that they were elevated by "sharp, incisive and perfectly crafted" songwriting from Humberstone. Describing Cruel World as "superb", he also stated that it was her best musical work to date. In a more reserved review, Matt Young of The Line of Best Fit complimented Humberstone for exploring new sounds in Cruel World, but described the album as a "faux embrace" and "contradictory".

== Track listing ==
Cruel World track listing
No.	Title	Writer(s)	Length
1.	"So It Starts..."	Holly Ffion Humberstone; Rob Milton; Nate Campany	0:45
2.	"Make It All Better"	Humberstone; Milton	3:57
3.	"To Love Somebody"	Humberstone; Milton; Jon Green	3:57
4.	"Cruel World"	Humberstone; Milton; Jake Greene; Benjamin Francis Leftwich	3:26
5.	"Die Happy"	Humberstone; Milton; Campany	3:49
6.	"White Noise"	Humberstone; Milton; Jon Green; Mikky Ekko	3:45
7.	"Lucy"	Humberstone; Milton; Ilsey Juber	2:51
8.	"Red Chevy"	Humberstone; Milton	3:00
9.	"Drunk Dialling"	Humberstone; Milton	3:41
10.	"Peachy"	Humberstone; Milton; Jake Greene; Jon Green	2:44
11.	"Blue Dream"	Humberstone; Milton	3:20
12.	"Beauty Pageant"	Humberstone; Milton; Leftwich; Michel Bernholc; Eddie George; Jean Paul Dréau; Matt Zara	3:15
Total length:			38:30

So It Ends bonus tracks
No.	Title	Writer(s)	Length
13.	"Too Cute to Be Lonely"	Humberstone; Milton; Leftwich; JT Daly	3:16
14.	"Killing the Mood"	Humberstone; Milton; Leftwich; Jonah Summerfield	3:23
15.	"Terminally Yours"	Humberstone; Milton; Campany; George	4:05
16.	"Silver Sky"	Humberstone; Milton; George; Zara; Leftwich; Madi Diaz	4:11
17.	"Annihilation"	Humberstone; Milton	3:59
Total length:			57:24

== Personnel ==
Credits are adapted from Tidal.

=== Musicians ===
- Holly Humberstone – vocals (all tracks), background vocals (tracks 1–4, 6–17), synthesizer (1, 4, 5), piano (2, 5, 8), keyboards (4), guitar (17)
- Rob Milton – synthesizer (all tracks), guitar (1–6, 8, 9, 11, 13-14, 16-17), programming (1–3, 6, 8, 9, 11, 13-14, 17), bass (2–4, 6, 8, 9, 11, 13-16), piano (2), percussion (3–6, 9, 11, 13-16), acoustic guitar (3–5, 7, 12-16), background vocals (3–5, 8, 10, 15), cowbell (3), wurlitzer (16)
- Bobby Hawk – strings (1, 3, 5, 13)
- Ian Fitchuk – drums (3, 4, 9)
- Seth Tackaberry – piano, synthesizer (3); background vocals (4)
- Jon Green – piano (3, 10); lap steel guitar, synthesizer (6)
- Lee Smith – background vocals (3)
- Nina Lim – strings (3)
- Lauren O'Donnell Anderson – background vocals (4)
- Jonah Summerfield – programming, synthesizer (5, 14); Mellotron (7); percussion, keyboard (14); drums (16)
- Aksel Coe – drums (5, 8, 12, 14)
- Nate Campany – bass (5)
- Drew Taubenfeld – pedal steel guitar (5)
- John Waugh – saxophone (8)
- Matt Zara – bass, piano, synthesizer (12)
- Rosie Danvers – string arrangement (12)
- Wired Strings – strings (12)
  - Hayley Pomfrett – violin
  - Kerenza Peacock – violin
  - Michael Trainor – violin
  - Natalia Bonner – violin
  - Natalie Klouda – violin
  - Patrick Kiernan – violin
  - Sarah Sexton – violin
  - Stephen Morris – violin
  - Clifton Harrison – viola
  - Meghan Cassidy – viola
  - Rosie Danvers – cello
  - Bryony James – cello
- Dodie – clarinet (12)
- JT Daly - acoustic guitar, drums, synthesizer (13)
- Emily Nelson Rodgers - cello (13)

=== Technical ===
- Rob Milton – production, engineering
- Jonah Summerfield – production (5, 14)
- Matt Zara – production (12)
- TommyD – string production (12)
- Mark "Spike" Stent – mixing (1–6, 8, 9, 12-14)
- Lee Smith – mixing (7, 10, 11, 15-17)
- Randy Merrill – mastering
- Nick Taylor – engineering (12)
- Rob Sellens – engineering (12)
- Olly Thompson – engineering assistance (12)

== Charts ==
Chart performance for Cruel World
Chart (2026)	Peak position
Australian Albums (ARIA)	18
Austrian Albums (Ö3 Austria)	65
Belgian Albums (Ultratop Flanders)	49
French Physical Albums (SNEP)	85
German Albums (Offizielle Top 100)	46
German Rock & Metal Albums (Offizielle Top 100)	13
Scottish Albums (Official Charts)	2
Swiss Albums (Schweizer Hitparade)	89
UK Albums (Official Charts)	4
US Top Album Sales (Billboard)	47
