= Too Cute to Be Lonely =

2026 single by Holly Humberstone

Single by Holly Humberstone

from the album Cruel World... So It Ends
- Released: 30 September 2026
- Genre: Alt pop; synth-pop
- Length: 3:16
- Label: Polydor
- Songwriters: Holly Ffion Humberstone; Rob Milton; JT Daly; Benjamin Francis Leftwich
- Producer: Rob Milton

Holly Humberstone singles chronology
"Beauty Pageant" (2026)	"Too Cute to Be Lonely" (2026)	"Killing the Mood" (2026)

Music video
- "Too Cute to Be Lonely" on YouTube

"Too Cute to Be Lonely" is a song recorded by English singer-songwriter Holly Humberstone. It was released by Polydor Records on 30 September 2026 as a single from the deluxe edition of her second studio album, Cruel World (2026). Humberstone wrote the track with long-term collaborators Rob Milton and Benjamin Francis Leftwich, as well as JT Daly.

An alt synth-pop song, the lyrical content involves Humberstone wanting to find a romantic and physical connection. Although thematically connecting to Cruel World, it was seen as a lyrical departure from the contents of the original album, instead seen as a more positive outlook on relationships. It was accompanied by a music video directed by Silken Weinberg.

== Background and release ==
Humberstone released "Die Happy" in November 2025 as the lead single from her second studio album, Cruel World (2026). It was followed by "To Love Somebody", "Cruel World" and "Beauty Pageant", with the album eventually released on 10 April 2026. In June, a reimagined version of four songs from the album was released as an extended play, It's a Real Cruel World.

Following the release of Cruel World, Humberstone embarked on various tours and festival appearances, including sets at Reading and Leeds, Summer Sonic, Mad Cool, All Things Go and Governors Ball, as well as a headline concert tour across North America and supporting the War on Drugs at British Summer Time. Her set at Reading and Leeds included the first live performances of "Too Cute to Be Lonely" prior to its release. On 30 September, she announced a deluxe edition of Cruel World, titled Cruel World... So It Ends, releasing "Too Cute to Be Lonely" as a single from the project.

== Composition and lyrics ==
Humberstone co-wrote "Too Cute to Be Lonely" with long-term collaborators Rob Milton and Benjamin Francis Leftwich, as well as JT Daly. Milton also handled the production of the track. It has been described as an alt pop and synth-pop song with subtle nods to disco and opera. Inspired by ABBA, Madonna and Robyn, the song was billed as having a "more dancefloor-oriented sound" to Humberstone's typical releases. Speaking about the song and its accompanying deluxe tracks, Humberstone explained that it was a continuation of the original album's story. She explained: "To me the fairytale doesn't end, it just turns a page to a new chapter. Cruel World was a journey of self discovery and finding my confidence in my voice, the songs within So It Ends feel more confident and self assured."

"Too Cute to Be Lonely" sees a lyrical shift from the material Humberstone wrote throughout Cruel World, an album that explored heartbreak, isolation and complicated relationships. "Too Cute to Be Lonely" instead sees her looking to find romance and physical connection, feeling it is a shame to waste a night doing nothing. The lyrical content sees her be flirtatious and suggest that a situationship may be fun. The production was also noted as "lighter and more energetic than the emotional heaviness associated with the original album".

== Critical reception ==
Lily Howard, writing for Music Is to Blame, complimented the "playfulness and optimism" that Humberstone displayed on the song. Despite showcasing a shift in sonic and lyrical content, Howard appreciated that the underlying theme of loneliness linked the song to Cruel World. Nmesoma Okechukwu, writing for Euphoria, billed Humberstone a "rising star" and felt she had mastered the art of "writing songs that speak to her generation, while still retaining a unique air of timelessness".

== Music video ==
"Too Cute to Be Lonely" was accompanied by a music video directed by Silken Weinberg, who worked on the visuals for Cruel World alongside Humberstone and her sister, Eleri. It begins with a book written in ancient script, before opening to a castle, where Humberstone, sporting a shiny gown, sings and dances around the room. There are references to fairytale stories including Rapunzel and Sleeping Beauty, and by the conclusion of the video, her long-awaited prince arrives with a rose.

== Credits and personnel ==
Credits adapted from Spotify.

- Holly Humberstone – vocals, songwriting,
- Rob Milton – production, songwriting, production, recording engineer, programming, guitar, synthesiser, bass, acoustic guitar, percussion
- JT Daly – songwriting, additional production, drums, synthesiser, acoustic guitar
- Benjamin Francis Leftwich – songwriting
- Bobby Hawk – strings
- Emily Nelson Rodgers – cello
- Mark 'Spike' Stent – mixing engineer
- Randy Merrill – mastering engineer

== Charts ==
Chart performance for "Too Cute to Be Lonely"
Chart (2026)	Peak position
Japan Hot Overseas (Billboard Japan)	13
Malta Airplay (Radiomonitor)	19

== Release history ==
Region	Date	Format	Label	Ref.
Various	30 September 2026	Digital download; streaming	Polydor	
