= Beauty Pageant (song) =

2026 single by Holly Humberstone

Single by Holly Humberstone

from the album Cruel World
- Released: 10 April 2026
- Length: 3:15
- Label: Polydor
- Songwriters: Holly Ffion Humberstone; Rob Milton; Matt Zara
- Producers: Rob Milton; Matt Zara

Holly Humberstone singles chronology
| "Cruel World" (2026) | "Beauty Pageant" (2026) | "Too Cute to Be Lonely" (2026) |

Music video
- "Beauty Pageant" on YouTube

"Beauty Pageant" is a song recorded by English singer-songwriter Holly Humberstone. It was released by Polydor Records on 10 April 2026 as the fourth single from her second studio album, Cruel World (2026). Humberstone wrote the track with long-term collaborator Rob Milton, who also produced it alongside Matt Zara. An accompanying music video was released alongside the song.

The lyrical content of the song dissects Humberstone's attitude towards women following growing up with three sisters, going to an all-girls school, then going straight into the music industry. She had realised she had toxic thought patterns of viewing other women as competition and wrote "Beauty Pageant" about the unrealistic expectations women face. The song features instrumentation from a live band, a production choice that was praised by critics including Why Now and PopMatters, who billed it the best song on Cruel World. Humberstone's vocals were also praised on the track.

== Background and release ==
After her debut album, Paint My Bedroom Black (2023), Humberstone returned to musical releases in 2025 with a contribution to the soundtrack for The Buccaneers, the song "Miss You to Death". Months later, she confirmed that a "new world" was beginning, hinting towards the start of a new album cycle. She released three singles: "Die Happy", "To Love Somebody" and "Cruel World", all of which preceded her third studio album, Cruel World (2026). In an interview with InStyle, she revealed the title of "Beauty Pageant", which was not released at the time. It was eventually released as a single alongside the release of Cruel World. An accompanying music video was released alongside the song, which features Humberstone under the spotlight "in a jewel-embellished satin corset".

== Composition and lyrics ==
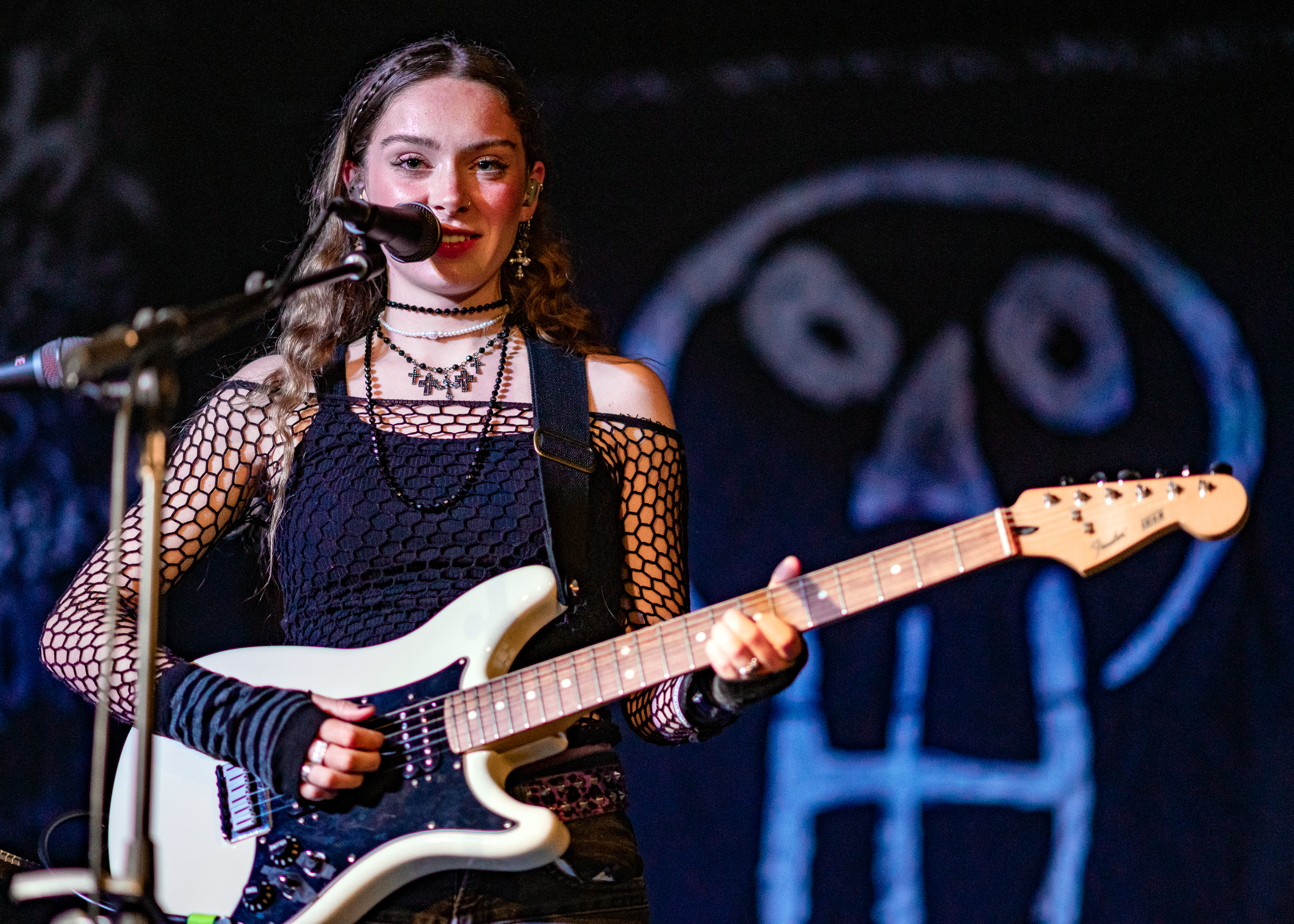
Humberstone was inspired to write "Beauty Pageant" after finding a broken jewellery box from her childhood.

Humberstone was inspired to write "Beauty Pageant" after finding a broken jewellery box in her childhood home. She was clearing out her old belongings following her parents listing her childhood home for sale and was surprised to find that despite being broken, it still played the tune when she spun the ballerina inside. Prior to the release of "Beauty Pageant", Humberstone spoke about the lyrical content in an interview with InStyle. She billed it her most vulnerable song to date as the lyrics explore her attitude towards women following growing up with three sisters, going to an all-girls school, then going straight into the music industry. She had realised she had toxic thought patterns of viewing other women as competition; she wrote "Beauty Pageant" about the "unrealistic expectations girls hold [themselves] to and trying to navigate this world that isn't built for [them]—pressures of being pretty, appearing busy and hard working, getting all of [their] validation from social media". She found the lyrics embarrassing to admit, but hoped people would relate to the "human element".

Having become accustomed to writing with a room full of men, she had long wanted to bring up the topic of attitudes towards women in songwriting sessions. However, she had put off broaching the subject since she knew her collaborators could not relate or connect personally. She eventually decided that the subject matter of the song was too important. Humberstone co-wrote "Beauty Pageant" alongside long-term collaborator Rob Milton, with help from Matt Zara; Milton and Zara also handled the production of the song. "Beauty Pageant" has been described as starting as a "gentle ballad" before introducing live instruments. Many of the string instruments were played by the musical group Wired Strings.

== Critical reception ==
Elliot John of Why Now complimented Milton and Zara's production on the track. They felt that throughout the album as a whole, the production of the songs never tended to "crowd" Humberstone, so they felt that the live strings on "Beauty Pageant" landed well. John also billed it as his stand-out track from Cruel World due to its production and lyrical content, hoping her next project would be rooted in its sound. PopMatters' Jeffrey Davies also agreed that it was the best song on Cruel World.

When the Horn Blows praised Humberstone's vocals showcases on "Beauty Pageant", as well as echoing their praise for the production and live instruments. The Indie Scene billed it the perfect album closer, highlighting its "angelic vocals and satisfyingly relatable lyrics and stories".

== Credits and personnel ==
Credits adapted from Spotify.

- Holly Humberstone – vocals, songwriting
- Rob Milton – production, songwriting, recording engineer, acoustic guitar, synthesiser
- Matt Zara – production, songwriting, bass, piano, synthesiser
- Rosie Danvers – string arrangement
- Wired Strings – strings
  - Hayley Pomfrett – violin
  - Kerenza Peacock – violin
  - Michael Trainor – violin
  - Natalia Bonner – violin
  - Natalie Klouda – violin
  - Patrick Kiernan – violin
  - Sarah Sexton – violin
  - Stephen Morris – violin
  - Clifton Harrison – viola
  - Meghan Cassidy – viola
  - Rosie Danvers – cello
  - Bryony James – cello
- Dodie – clarinet
- Aksel Coe – drums
- TommyD – string production
- Nick Taylor – engineering
- Rob Sellens – engineering
- Olly Thompson – engineering assistance
- Mark 'Spike' Stent – mixing engineer
- Randy Merrill – mastering engineer

== Release history ==
| Region | Date | Format | Label | Ref. |
|---|---|---|---|---|
| Various | 10 April 2026 | Digital download; streaming | Polydor | |
