= Die Happy =

Die Happy may refer to:

- Die Happy (American band), an American Christian rock band
- Die Happy (German band), a German alternative rock band
- "Die Happy" (song), a 2025 single by Holly Humberstone
- "Die Happy", a 2019 single by Dreamers
- "Die Happy", a song by Metric from the album Art of Doubt
- "Die Happy", a song by Sufjan Stevens from the album The Ascension
- Die Happy, a 2024 album by Emily Burns
