= London Is Lonely =

2022 single by Holly Humberstone

Single by Holly Humberstone
- Released: 20 January 2022
- Length: 3:54
- Label: Polydor; Darkroom; Interscope
- Songwriter: Holly Ffion Humberstone
- Producer: Rob Milton

Holly Humberstone singles chronology
"Seventeen Going Under" (2021)	"London Is Lonely" (2022)	"I Would Die 4 U" (2022)

Music video
- "London Is Lonely" on YouTube

"London Is Lonely" is a song recorded by English singer-songwriter Holly Humberstone. It was released on 20 January 2022 and was written solely by Humberstone. Rob Milton, her long-term collaborator, produced the song. She performed "London Is Lonely" at the 2022 Brit Awards, where she also won the Brit Award for Rising Star. A music video shot in an abandoned London Underground station accompanied the song.

The lyrical content of "London Is Lonely" explores Humberstone's experiences with moving to London, specifically the loneliness and isolation she felt. She had lived in Grantham until she was 19 and moved down to Deptford in a bid to further her music career. Feeling like an "alien", writing songs in her bedroom became her safe space. NME billed it a "heartbreaking number".

== Background and release ==
Following the release of her debut extended play (EP) Falling Asleep at the Wheel (2020), Humberstone signed with Polydor Records in the UK and Darkroom and Interscope Records in the United States. With the label, she released her second EP, The Walls Are Way Too Thin. As well as spawning the single "Scarlett", the EP earned Humberstone a Brit Award for Rising Star, as well as the Best Mixtape accolade at the 2022 NME Awards. Her first musical release following the project was a feature on Sam Fender's song "Seventeen Going Under". "London Is Lonely" followed as her next solo release, released on 20 January 2022. A music video for "London Is Lonely" was filmed in an abandoned London Underground station.

== Composition and lyrics ==
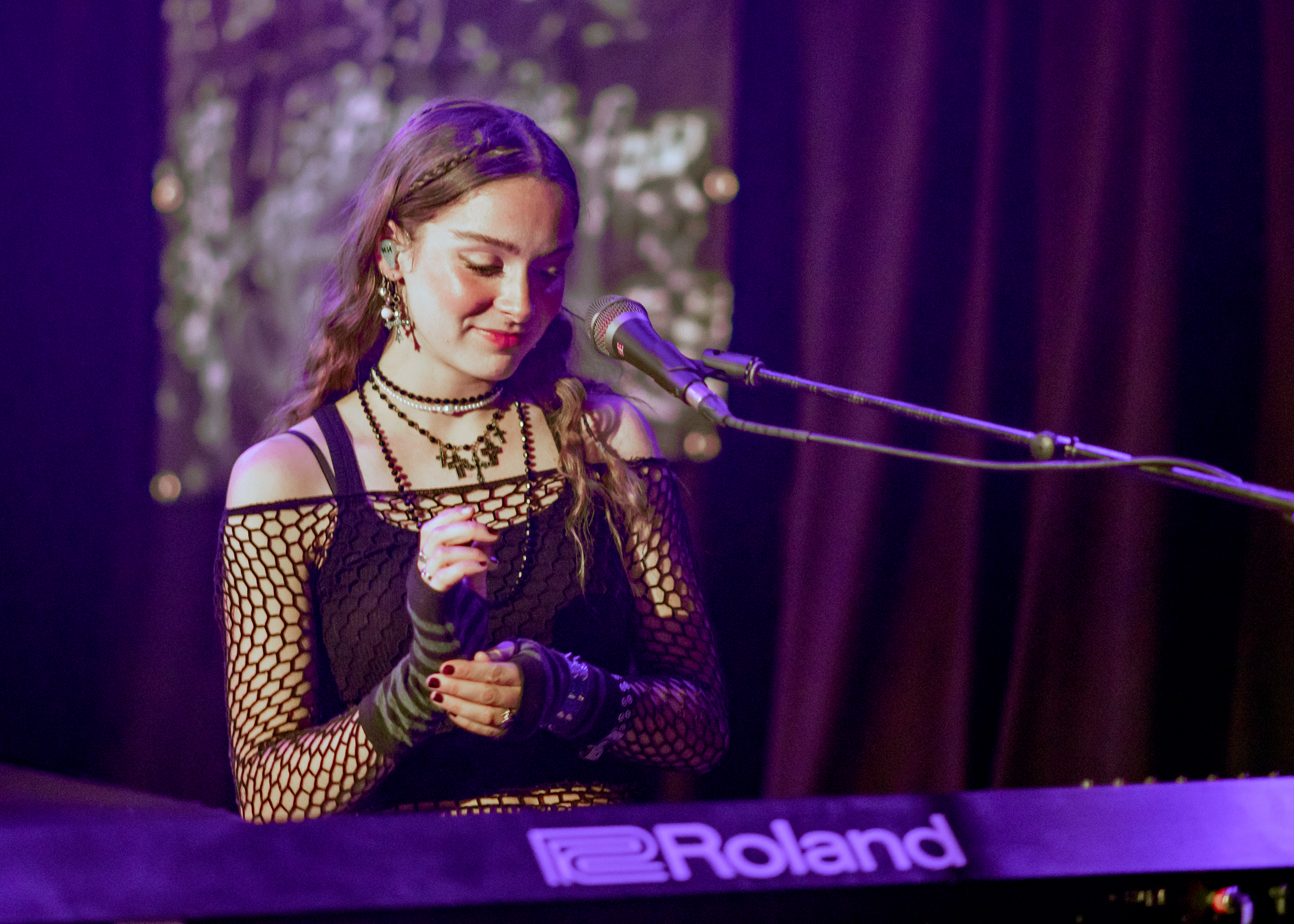
Humberstone moved to Deptford aged 19 and found the experience isolating.

Humberstone wrote "London Is Lonely" by herself, with long-term collaborator Rob Milton handling the production. She wrote it in February 2020, just prior to the COVID-19 pandemic affected the UK. She wrote it about her experiences moving out of her childhood home in Grantham and down to London in a bid to further her music career. She had moved to Deptford, aged 19, into a house share which was also referenced in "The Walls Are Way Too Thin". She felt overwhelmed with the move and despite having so many more people around her, she felt isolated and that she did not belong there. Humberstone felt that going home each day and writing songs had become her "safe space" to process daily events, which resulted in writing the track.

Humberstone references Stranger Things in the opening line of "London Is Lonely", comparing London to the Upside Down. Speaking of the line, she admitted that she felt like an alien when she wrote the song. She was living in a small flat in an area she did not know well and had very few friends, therefore spent a lot of time shut inside her bedroom alone. She added: "I just shut myself in my room because the outside was so chaotic – I felt like I couldn’t really deal with it and process it." On its release almost two years later, she still confessed that she often related to the loneliness of the track.

== Live performances ==
Humberstone debuted "London Is Lonely" at the 2022 Brit Awards ceremony; she also received the Rising Star accolade at the ceremony. She also performed the song on BBC Radio 1 for their Live Lounge segment, as well as a cover of Doja Cat's "Kiss Me More".

== Critical reception ==
NME felt the track was "poignant" and urged people to listen to the "heartbreaking number". UDiscover Music agreed, labelling it "her most heartbreaking and poignant song yet" and felt that Humberstone had "become the UK's next great songwriting talent".

== Credits and personnel ==
Credits adapted from Spotify.

- Holly Humberstone – vocals, songwriting, piano
- Rob Milton – production, programming, guitar, percussion
- John Waugh – saxophone
- Reuben Flower – trumpet
- Trevor Mires – trombone
- Lee Smith – mixing
- Mike Bozzi – mastering engineer

== Charts ==
Weekly chart performance
Chart (2022)	Peak position
UK Sales (OCC)	41

== Release history ==
Region	Date	Format	Label	Ref.
Various	20 January 2022	Digital download; streaming	Polydor; Darkroom; Interscope	
