= Cruel World (song) =

2026 single by Holly Humberstone

Single by Holly Humberstone

from the album Cruel World
- Released: 13 March 2026
- Length: 3:26
- Label: Polydor
- Songwriters: Holly Ffion Humberstone; Rob Milton; Benjamin Francis Leftwich
- Producer: Rob Milton

Holly Humberstone singles chronology
"To Love Somebody" (2026)	"Cruel World" (2026)	"Beauty Pageant" (2026)

Visualiser
- "Cruel World" on YouTube

"Cruel World" is a song recorded by English singer-songwriter Holly Humberstone. It was released by Polydor Records on 13 March 2026 as the third single from her second studio album of the same name (2026). Humberstone wrote the track with long-term collaborators Rob Milton and Benjamin Francis Leftwich, with Milton handling the production.

The lyrical content of "Cruel World" dissects the dual feelings of love and pain within long-distance relationships. It explores Humberstone's perception of the world being distorted due to not having her partner nearby and she billed it her favourite song she had written to date. It was praised by Clash and Euphoria for Humberstone's "diaristic" style of writing and Milton's production.

== Background and release ==
After her debut album, Paint My Bedroom Black (2023), Humberstone returned to musical releases in 2025 with a contribution to the soundtrack for The Buccaneers, the song "Miss You to Death". Months later, she confirmed that a "new world" was beginning, hinting towards the start of a new album cycle. She thanked fans on social media for "waiting for [her] to get it right". "Die Happy" then was released on 5 November 2025, with an album announcement expected to follow. Humberstone announced the album, Cruel World, on 23 January 2026, as well as releasing "To Love Somebody" as its second single. "Cruel World" was then released as the third single from the album on 13 March 2026. It was released alongside an accompanying visualiser inspired by Victorian theatre, directed by Silken Weinberg. In June, a reimagined version of the song was released as part of It's a Real Cruel World.

== Composition and lyrics ==
Humberstone co-wrote "Cruel World" with long-term collaborators Rob Milton and Benjamin Francis Leftwich. The lyrical content explores Humberstone in a long-distance relationship, with her perception of the world distorted due to not having her partner nearby and having "no fun in going out solo". The lyrics also dissect the dichotomy of finding euphoria and deep love in their relationship, despite the distance. Humberstone billed it her favourite song that she had written to date.

== Critical reception ==
Clash praised "Cruel World", complimenting Humberstone's "diaristic flourish" and "neat melodic twists and turns". Euphoria also praised Humberstone's songwriting and felt that she had "beautifully portrayed" the pain of longing for someone.

== Credits and personnel ==
Credits adapted from Spotify.

- Holly Humberstone – vocals, songwriting, piano, synthesiser, keyboard
- Rob Milton – songwriting, production, backing vocals, guitar, synthesiser, acoustic guitar, bass, percussion, recording engineer
- Benjamin Francis Leftwich – songwriting
- Seth Tackleberry – backing vocals
- Lauren O'Donnell Anderson – backing vocals
- Ian Fitchuk – drums
- Mark 'Spike' Stent – mixing engineer
- Randy Merrill – mastering engineer

== Charts ==
=== Weekly charts ===
Weekly chart performance
Chart (2026)	Peak position
Japan Hot Overseas (Billboard Japan)	18
Latvia Airplay (TopHit)	23

=== Monthly charts ===
Monthly chart performance
Chart (2026)	Peak position
Latvia Airplay (TopHit)	38

== Release history ==
Region	Date	Format	Label	Ref.
Various	13 March 2026	Digital download; streaming	Polydor	
