= To Love Somebody (Holly Humberstone song) =

2026 single by Holly Humberstone

Single by Holly Humberstone

from the album Cruel World
- Released: 23 January 2026
- Genre: Pop
- Length: 3:57
- Label: Polydor
- Songwriters: Holly Ffion Humberstone; Rob Milton; Jon Green
- Producer: Rob Milton

Holly Humberstone singles chronology
"Die Happy" (2025)	"To Love Somebody" (2026)	"Cruel World" (2026)

Visualiser
- "To Love Somebody" on YouTube

"To Love Somebody" is a song recorded by English singer-songwriter Holly Humberstone. It was released by Polydor Records on 23 January 2026 as the second single from her second studio album, Cruel World (2026). Humberstone wrote the track with long-term collaborators Rob Milton and Jon Green, with Milton handling the production.

The lyrical content of "To Love Somebody" dissects the silver lining of losing relationships. She was inspired after witnessing a close friend's heartbreak and wanted to flip the narrative to "at least you got to love somebody". "To Love Somebody" is a thematic and sonic shift for Humberstone and was praised by critics. DIY billed it "a bittersweet earworm of a track", with Atwood writer Mitch Mosk saying that he cried "happy tears" upon his first listen.

== Background and release ==
Humberstone released her debut album, Paint My Bedroom Black, in 2023, as well as supporting Olivia Rodrigo on the Sour Tour. In 2024, she released the EP Work in Progress. It was composed of songs not included on Paint My Bedroom Black as opposed to releasing a typical deluxe edition. 2024 also saw her supporting Taylor Swift on The Eras Tour at Wembley Stadium.

In mid-2025, Humberstone returned to musical releases with a contribution to the soundtrack for The Buccaneers, the song "Miss You to Death". Months later, she confirmed that a "new world" was beginning, hinting towards the start of a new album cycle. She thanked fans on social media for "waiting for [her] to get it right". "Die Happy" then was released on 5 November 2025, with an album announcement expected to follow. Humberstone announced the album, Cruel World, on 23 January 2026, as well as releasing "To Love Somebody". It was accompanied by a visualiser, directed by Silken Weinberg. It was inspired by Brothers Grimm, Victorian theatre and Nosferatu. In June, a reimagined version of the song was released as part of It's a Real Cruel World.

== Composition and lyrics ==
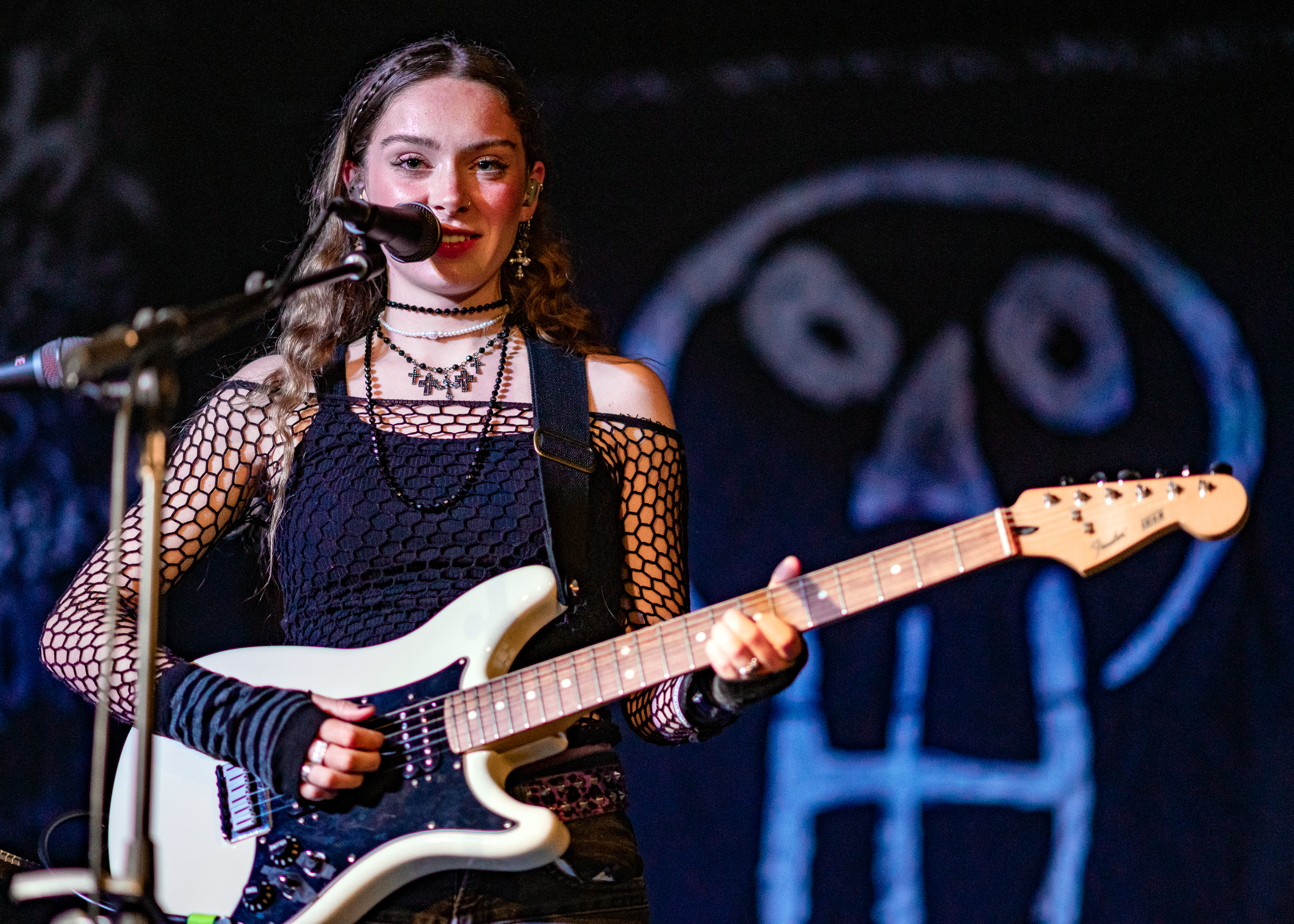
Humberstone wrote "To Love Somebody" after witnessing a friend's heartbreak.

"To Love Somebody" is a pop song. Humberstone wrote the track with long-term collaborators Rob Milton and Jon Green; Milton also produced it. She wanted the theme for the song to be about the "grounding and destabilising" feelings that come with love. She felt that there is often a contradiction with love, adding: "to love somebody, is to hurt somebody and to lose somebody, well at least you got to love somebody. In order to feel extreme happiness, you have to know extreme sadness."

Speaking to Atwood about writing the song, Humberstone stated that she wrote the track after seeing someone close to her go through a "brutal heartbreak". Despite the hurt involved, she wanted to express that it is better to have loved and lost, deeming it "part of the human experience". "To Love Somebody" was recognised as thematically different to much of Humberstone's discography. As opposed to talking about fear and anxiety surrounding relationships, the lyrical content dissects a "warmer, more grounded, and self-assured" reflection of love. The lyrics talk about cherishing the love you have, as well as finding the silver lining in the love you have lost. "To Love Somebody" also features a sonic shift from prior singles, with an upbeat tempo.

== Critical reception ==
NME described "To Love Somebody" as a "confessional and boldly vulnerable" song. Mitch Mosk, writing for Atwood, admitted that he cried "happy tears" upon his first listen to the song and billed it a "glistening, gut-punch anthem". Despite feeling it was thematically and sonically different from much of her work, Mosk felt it was at its core, a "familiar Humberstone alchemy" and praised the lyrical content. DIY commended the listenability of the song, calling it "a bittersweet earworm of a track". DIY also praised the visualiser for the song, calling it "delicious". Euphoria also praised the lyrics, writing that she "knew how to infuse every line with a depth of emotion".

== Credits and personnel ==
Credits adapted from Spotify.

- Holly Humberstone – vocals, songwriting, piano
- Rob Milton – songwriting, production, backing vocals, programming, guitar, synthesiser, acoustic guitar, percussion, bass, cowbell
- Jon Green – songwriting, piano, composing
- Bobby Hawk – strings
- Ian Fitchuk – drums
- Seth Tackaberry – piano, synthesiser
- Nina Lim – strings
- Mark 'Spike' Stent – mixing engineer
- Randy Merrill – mastering engineer

== Charts ==
=== Weekly charts ===
Weekly chart performance
Chart (2026)	Peak position
Austria Airplay (IFPI)	3
Croatia International Airplay (Top lista)	29
Estonia Airplay (TopHit)	64
Finland Airplay (Radiosoittolista)	42
Germany (GfK)	99
Germany Airplay (MusicTrace)	1
Latvia Airplay (LaIPA)	12
Lithuania Airplay (TopHit)	21
New Zealand Hot Singles (RMNZ)	16
Slovakia Airplay (ČNS IFPI)	21
Slovenia Airplay (Radiomonitor)	12
Switzerland Airplay (MusicTrace)	7

=== Monthly charts ===
Monthly chart performance
Chart (2026)	Peak position
Estonia Airplay (TopHit)	94
Latvia Airplay (TopHit)	90
Lithuania Airplay (TopHit)	31

== Release history ==
Region	Date	Format	Label	Ref.
Various	23 January 2026	Digital download; streaming	Polydor	
