= Superbloodmoon =

2023 song by Holly Humberstone and D4vd

Single by Holly Humberstone and D4vd

from the album Paint My Bedroom Black
- Released: 28 July 2023
- Length: 2:31
- Label: Polydor; Darkroom; Geffen
- Songwriters: Holly Humberstone; David Burke; Scott Harris; Rob Milton
- Producer: Rob Milton

Holly Humberstone singles chronology
"Room Service" (2023)	"Superbloodmoon" (2023)	"Into Your Room" (2023)

D4vd singles chronology
"The Bridge" (2023)	"Superbloodmoon" (2023)	"Notes from a Wrist" (2023)

"Superbloodmoon" is a song by English singer Holly Humberstone and American singer D4vd. It was released as a single on 28 July 2023, a part of the album Paint My Bedroom Black. D4vd's feature on the song received mixed reviews. Following Celeste Rivas Hernandez's dead body being found in D4vd's car boot, the song was removed from streaming services.

== Background ==
During a concert, D4vd joined Holly Humberstone to perform "Superbloodmoon" before release. The song was released on 28 July 2023, through Darkroom, Geffen, and Polydor Records. The song was released as a single for Paint My Bedroom Black. The song was recorded in "just a few hours" while D4vd was in the United Kingdom on a tour.

"Superbloodmoon" is about emotional connection across distance, inspired by both of the artists constantly traveling and feeling disconnected from their homes and the people they care about. The title was a metaphor for "two people witnessing the same thing no matter where they are in the world." Following Celeste Rivas Hernandez's dead body being found in D4vd's car boot, the song was removed from streaming services.

== Critical reception ==
Hannah Jocelyn of Pitchfork stated that the song had a "stiff duet" with D4vd. Jocelyn states the song has a "lovely narrative" and creation production elements to keep the song interesting. Writing for Paste, Alyssa Goldberg praised D4vd's feature, calling it a "beautiful feature." Hollie Geraghty of NME praised the "cinematic vignettes" of two people separated by distance but emotionally connected.
