= It's a Real Cruel World =

2026 EP by Holly Humberstone

EP by Holly Humberstone
- Released: 5 June 2026
- Length: 14:22
- Label: Polydor
- Producer: Rob Milton

Holly Humberstone chronology
Cruel World (2026)	It's a Real Cruel World (2026)

It's a Real Cruel World is the fourth extended play by the English singer-songwriter Holly Humberstone. It was released on 5 June 2026 through Polydor Records as a companion project to her second studio album, Cruel World (2026). Released two months after the album, it is composed of four reimagined versions of songs included on Cruel World.

Humberstone has admitted that she found it difficult to select songs to include since she felt she could have reimagined the entirety of Cruel World, but ultimately went with four fan-favourites: "White Noise", "To Love Somebody", "Red Chevy" and "Cruel World". She did not want them to be "basic acoustic versions" and opted to experiment with the instruments used and add ad libs, as well as making the tracks appropriate for summer.

== Background and release ==
Humberstone released her second studio album, Cruel World, on 10 April 2026. It featured singles "To Love Somebody" and its titular track, "Cruel World", amongst others. The album dealt with themes of love, belonging, steadiness, repair and discipline and was predominantly produced by long-term collaborator Rob Milton. Humberstone found it difficult to select songs to reimagine for an EP, admitting that she felt she could have reimagined every track from Cruel World and wished she had time to do so. She ultimately chose to pick four fan-favourites from the response she had noticed: "White Noise", "To Love Somebody", "Red Chevy" and "Cruel World".

Throughout the process of reimagining the four selected songs, Humberstone did not want to make "basic acoustic versions" and wanted the offerings to be "more interesting". She felt that since Cruel World was a "very summer-coded" album, she wanted to make stripped back versions that toyed with different instruments and ad libs. She found it a pleasant experience and had fun experimenting with how she could make her pre-existing songs sound. It was released on 5 June 2026, alongside the announcement that she would be an opener for Gracie Abrams' Look at My Life Tour later in the year. It was accompanied by visualisers and artwork credited to Silken Weinberg, who also directed material for Cruel World.

== Critical reception ==
Writing for his website, Eric Alper described the EP as a "gorgeous, vulnerable companion piece" and felt that it proved that the selected tracks could "hold up under any light".

== Track listing ==
It's a Real Cruel World track listing
No.	Title	Writer(s)	Length
1.	"It's Just White Noise"	Holly Ffion Humberstone; Rob Milton; Jon Green; Mikky Ekko	3:57
2.	"At Least You Got to Love Somebody"	Humberstone; Milton; Green	4:03
3.	"Back in Your Red Chevy"	Humberstone; Milton	2:55
4.	"It's a Real Cruel World"	Humberstone; Milton; Benjamin Francis Leftwich	3:27
Total length:			14:22

== Personnel ==
Credits are adapted from Tidal.

- Holly Humberstone – vocals, background vocals
- Rob Milton – production, engineering (all tracks); acoustic guitar (tracks 1, 2, 4); bass, electric guitar, percussion, Wurlitzer electric piano (1); guitar (2, 4), piano (3)
- Lee Smith – mixing
- Simon Francis – mastering
- Drew Taubenfeld – pedal steel guitar (1)
- Nina Lim – strings (1)
