= Ninush =

English music artist

- Born: Nina Lim
- Instrument: Violin
- Labels: The Bird Records

Nina Lim, known as Ninush, is a British violinist. Gaining prominence through her live work alongside the band Black Country, New Road and other artists, she released a debut solo EP, The Flowers I See You In, on 6 February 2026.

== Early life and education ==
Lim has stated that she started playing the violin at age seven, and that she was given the childhood nickname Ninush or Ninusha by her Polish mother and grandparents; this comes from her first name and the suffix -ush or -usha, which she has said is used in Polish to make names "cuter".

She studied classical violin at the Guildhall School of Music and Drama, though has stated that she developed "crippling performance anxiety" during this time. She gradually got involved with songwriting as a hobby, creating a selection of songs for fun with producer Sam Tsang, who showed her music to others. Friends of Lim encouraged her to release her music publicly.

== Career ==
While she was studying at Guildhall, she was asked to come with the band Black Country, New Road on tour, filling in for the band's usual violinist Georgia Ellery in 2022; these concerts, working with members of the Windmill scene, were Lim's first experiences of playing live music away from her usual classical setting. Time in this scene aided her with her anxiety. She became a familiar face among session musicians based in London, working with artists Holly Humberstone, Little Simz, Jockstrap, Geordie Greep, as well as more pop-associated acts Jade and Anne-Marie. In 2025, she supported Shura at Bush Hall. She returned home after touring, spending a solitary period writing music.

=== The Flowers I See You In ===
Lim released her first two singles under the moniker Ninush, "The End" and "Stardoll", both of which came from her early songwriting sessions and live experimentation and referencing isolation following her time touring. In November 2025, Lim released the single "I Don't Mind", announcing her debut solo EP, The Flowers I See You In. She remarked that it was "the closest [she had] come to writing a pop song". Its video features the choreographers Foam Sweet Foam. On 6 February 2026, the EP became the first release of The Bird Records, a record label set up by Black Country, New Road drummer Charlie Wayne, as well as Mita De of the record labels Brownswood, Ninja Tune, and Polydor. Lim drew the album artwork herself, and had her friend Katie Broderick convert it into a lino print. The album largely features piano and string-led compositions, and was produced by Sam Tsang. Lim has cited the score of Poor Things, as well as the soundtracks to Disney films Fantasia and the original Alice in Wonderland as influences for the project. "Tormentor", a song on the EP from which it gets its name, covers Lim's grief for the loss of her father, as do other songs on the project. Daisy Carter of DIY gave the album four stars, calling it "a project of understated beauty, both full-bodied and feather-light."

== Personal life ==
Lim's father died when she was at an early age.
