= Work in Progress (EP) =

2024 EP by Holly Humberstone

EP by Holly Humberstone
- Released: 15 March 2024
- Length: 15:14
- Label: Polydor; Darkroom; Geffen
- Producer: Rob Milton; Andrew Sarlo

Holly Humberstone chronology
Paint My Bedroom Black (2023)	Work in Progress (2024)	Cruel World (2026)

Singles from Work in Progress
- 1. "Dive" Released: 15 February 2024; 2. "Work in Progress" Released: 15 March 2024

Work in Progress is the third extended play by the English singer-songwriter Holly Humberstone. It was released on 15 March 2024. Released just six months after her debut album, Paint My Bedroom Black (2023), Humberstone initially planned on releasing a deluxe edition of the album but decided against it. She did not want to release filler songs and instead searched through her archive of demos and found unfinished tracks that she felt determined to release.

The lyrical content of Work in Progress dissects themes including uncertainty around love, anxiety, imperfect relationships and depression. The majority of the EP was produced by Rob Milton, a long-time collaborator of Humberstone's. It was mostly praised by critics, who complimented Humberstone's vocals and vulnerable songwriting, as well as praising the production of the tracks.

== Background and release ==
Humberstone released two extended plays (EPs), Falling Asleep at the Wheel and The Walls Are Way Too Thin, in 2020 and 2021, respectively. She announced in 2023 that her debut album was titled Paint My Bedroom Black; it was released on 13 October 2023. Following its release, Humberstone assumed that she would release a deluxe edition with songs that did not make the final track listing. However, she later decided against it. She said: "One day I was like, 'I don't want to release a deluxe album that's just loads of filler.' And I went back through all of these demos and I found a bunch of songs - all of them are from different points over the last few years. I loved these songs and they somehow just kind of got forgotten about. I just wanted to release them!"

Humberstone titled the EP Work in Progress as she felt it represented her and that she woke up as a different person everyday. She also wanted to depict that every song starts as a work in progress and that many remain unfinished demos. However, she felt that she "couldn't leave behind" the four tracks chosen for this EP. "Dive" was released as the first single from the project in February. The EP was then released on 15 March 2024 through Polydor, Darkroom and Geffen Records. Released just six months after Paint My Bedroom Black, she cited her reason for the quick release as wanting it out before she was next touring.

== Composition ==
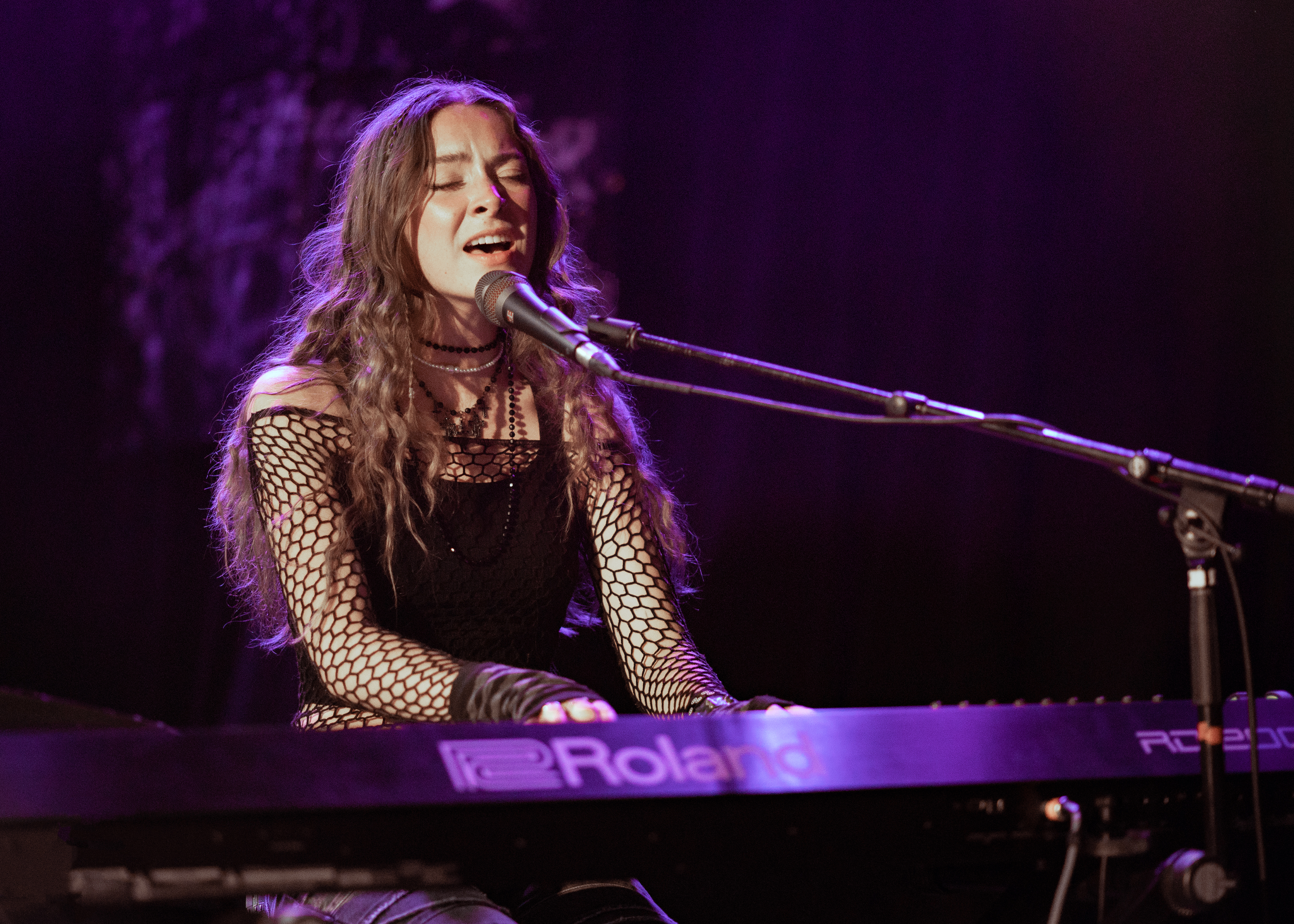
Work in Progress is composed of old songs Humberstone had found in her archives.

The majority of Work in Progress was produced and written with Rob Milton, Humberstone's long-time collaborator. It also features credits from Benjamin Francis Leftwich, Andrew Sarlo and William Taylor. "Dive", the opening track of Work in Progress, begins as a gentle acoustic song that builds into "fun melodic flourishes". With isolated vocals throughout the verses, the chorus then features a harmonised section. The lyrical content of "Dive" talks about the cautious mindset around the beginning of a new romantic connection, following a bad breakup. She wrote it as a warning to a man to not get involved with her, believing she would hurt him. Humberstone's vocals in the song were described as "feathery" and compared to that of Billie Eilish. "Dive" also samples a scene from The Real Housewives of Beverly Hills. "Work in Progress", the second and titular track, features an acoustic guitar throughout and has a "melancholic" vibe. It also contains a drumline that mimics the sound of a heartbeat. Its lyrics dissect the story of an imperfect love, describing her romantic partner as incomplete, but still loving them.

"Down Swinging", the third track, marks a sonic shift from the previous two tracks, with a faster pace and an electronic sound incorporated. An '80s inspired song, the lyrics see Humberstone admit her toxic traits but wanting to push herself through the bad days. Speaking about writing it, she said: "I felt like wallowing in self pity and then we wrote the chorus which says 'I can take it, give me hellfire'. I constantly need to give myself little reminders like that to push myself through the bad days - not to let my brain win and to not go down without a fight." The closing track on the EP, "Easy Tiger", sees Humberstone express gratitude for those who know what to say and do when she feels depressed. A guitar ballad, its lyrics describe feelings of self-hatred and depressive episodes, until someone comforts her and knows what to say to help. It was likened to the music of Bon Iver.

== Critical reception ==
Melodic praised the EP, noting Humberstone's "vibrant storytelling and her ethereal vocals". The Line of Best Fit reviewed Work in Progress, in which they gave the EP a six out of ten. They felt that the EP had no lyrical or sonic surprises, as well as "a slight dreariness mixed with cloying romanticism which can grate". However, they appreciated Humberstone's vocals and vulnerability within her songwriting. When the Horn Blows felt the EP "boasts some of her best work to date" and was delighted that she had decided to release the songs formally, years after they were written. They also wrote that throughout the songs, Humberstone had "shown her undeniable ability to muster up incredibly emotive music which grips listeners from the get-go".

== Track listing ==
Work in Progress track listing
No.	Title	Writer(s)	Producer(s)	Length
1.	"Dive"	Holly Ffion Humberstone; Rob Milton	Milton	3:59
2.	"Work in Progress"	Humberstone; Andrew Sarlo; William Taylor	Sarlo	3:40
3.	"Down Swinging"	Humberstone; Milton; Benjamin Francis Leftwich	Milton	2:56
4.	"Easy Tiger"	Humberstone; Milton	Milton	4:37
Total length:				15:14

== Personnel ==
Credits adapted from Tidal.

- Holly Humberstone – vocals (all tracks), background vocals (tracks 1, 3, 4), piano (3)
- Lee Smith – mixing (all tracks), drums (1, 3)
- Matt Colton – mastering
- Rob Milton – acoustic guitar, electric guitar, programming, synthesizer (1, 3); background vocals (3); bass, guitar, percussion (4)
- Andrew Sarlo – drums, Moog bass, engineering (2)
- Will Taylor – guitar (2)
- Johnny "Bluehat" Davis – saxophone (3)
