= Die Happy (song) =

2025 single by Holly Humberstone

Single by Holly Humberstone

from the album Cruel World
- Released: 5 November 2025
- Genre: Alt pop
- Length: 3:49
- Label: Polydor
- Songwriters: Holly Ffion Humberstone; Rob Milton; Nate Campany
- Producers: Rob Milton; Jonah Summerfield

Holly Humberstone singles chronology
"Work in Progress" (2024)	"Die Happy" (2025)	"To Love Somebody" (2026)

Visualiser
- "Die Happy" on YouTube

"Die Happy" is a song recorded by English singer-songwriter Holly Humberstone. It was released by Polydor Records on 5 November 2025 as the lead single from her second studio album, Cruel World (2026). Humberstone wrote the track with long-term collaborators Rob Milton and Nate Campany, with Milton and Jonah Summerfield handling the production.

An alt pop ballad, the lyrical content of "Die Happy" explores the danger of falling in love recklessly. Humberstone was inspired by The Bloody Chamber and Dracula throughout the writing process and wanted the track to feel like a fairytale set at night. It was praised by critics and was billed a "bold new chapter" for Humberstone's artistry.

== Background and release ==
Humberstone released her debut album, Paint My Bedroom Black, in 2023, as well as supporting Olivia Rodrigo on the Sour Tour. In 2024, she released the EP Work in Progress. It was composed of songs not included on Paint My Bedroom Black as opposed to releasing a typical deluxe edition. 2024 also saw her supporting Taylor Swift on The Eras Tour at Wembley Stadium.

In mid-2025, Humberstone returned to musical releases with a contribution to the soundtrack for The Buccaneers, the song "Miss You to Death". Months later, she confirmed that a "new world" was beginning, hinting towards the start of a new album cycle. She thanked fans on social media for "waiting for [her] to get it right". "Die Happy" then was released on 5 November 2025 as the lead single from her second studio album, Cruel World. A visualiser, directed by Silken Weinberg, accompanied the song.

== Composition and lyrics ==
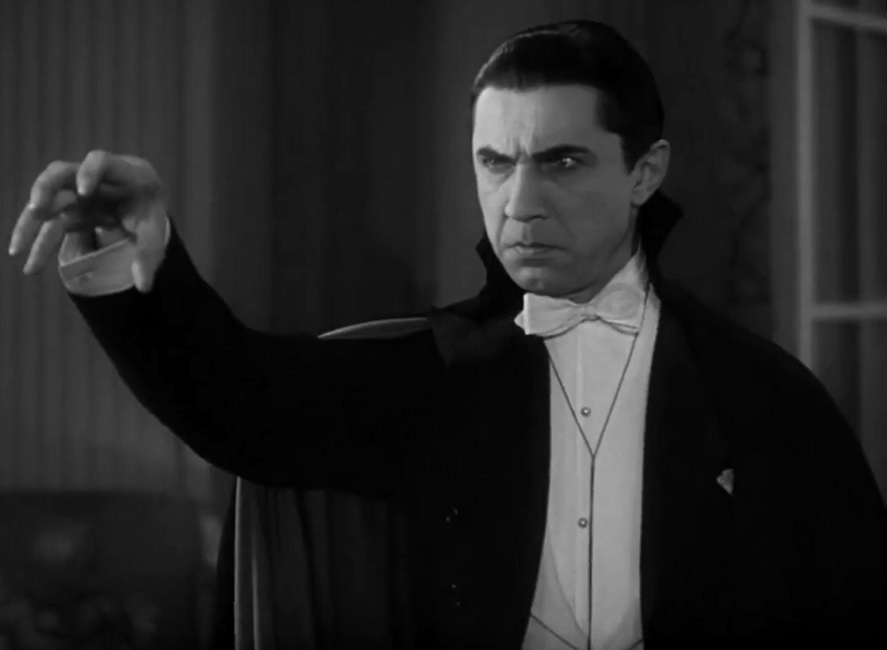
Dracula partly inspired "Die Happy".

"Die Happy" is an alt pop ballad. Humberstone wrote the track with long-term collaborators Rob Milton and Nate Campany; Milton and Jonah Summerfield produced it. Throughout the writing process, she was thinking about a fairytale at night, picturing "driving fast with the windows down and wandering through a crumbling old house". She was also inspired by The Bloody Chamber and Dracula.

With "Die Happy", Humberstone wanted to sing about the danger in love, as well as "the feeling of throwing yourself into love fully and recklessly". In its lyrical content, she aimed to show that to feel happiness, you also have to know "extreme sadness". She also hoped to reflect "deeper stability and agency" with her new music.

== Critical reception ==
Mystic Sons felt that "Die Happy" had marked a "bold new chapter" for Humberstone's artistry. They described it as "intoxicating" and "sweeping". The Forty Five listed it as their top recommendation of the week; they wrote: "Esteemed for her soft, delicate vocals and candid storytelling, Holly Humberstone has garnered a loyal and ever-growing following thanks to her string of high-profile supporting slots, as well as a BRIT Rising Star Award and two Ivor Novello nominations. Her new single "Die Happy" is an enamoured love ballad that has all the passion and elegance of a fairytale, but edged with Humberstone’s subtle, dark mystique."

== Credits and personnel ==
Credits adapted from Spotify.

- Holly Humberstone – vocals, songwriting, piano, synthesiser
- Rob Milton – songwriting, production, programming, recording engineer, backing vocals, guitar, synthesiser, acoustic guitar, percussion
- Nate Campany – songwriting, bass
- Jonah Summerfield – production, programming, synthesiser
- Aksel Coe – drums
- Bobby Hawk – strings
- Drew Taubenfeld – guitar
- Mark 'Spike' Stent – mixing engineer
- Randy Merrill – mastering engineer

== Release history ==
Region	Date	Format	Label	Ref.
Various	5 November 2025	Digital download; streaming	Polydor	
