= Seventeen Going Under (song) =

2021 single by Sam Fender

Single by Sam Fender

from the album Seventeen Going Under
- Released: 7 July 2021
- Genre: Indie rock
- Length: 5:02 (original); 4:57 (album version); 3:57 (radio edit)
- Label: Polydor
- Songwriter: Sam Fender
- Producer: Bramwell Bronte

Sam Fender singles chronology
"Winter Song" (2020)	"Seventeen Going Under" (2021)	"Aye" (2021)

Music video
- "Seventeen Going Under" on YouTube

"Seventeen Going Under" is a song by English singer-songwriter Sam Fender. It was released on 7 July 2021 as the lead single from his second studio album of the same name. The song was written by Fender, and produced by Bramwell Bronte. It was a sleeper hit, peaking at number three on the UK Singles Chart on 7 January 2022, becoming Fender's then highest-charting career single to date. An acoustic version, featuring Holly Humberstone, was also released.

"Seventeen Going Under" was named Hottest Record of the Year 2021 by BBC Radio 1 listeners and was voted number sixteen by Australian radio Triple J listeners on the Triple J Hottest 100 chart. It was also voted number one by more than 14,000 Radio X listeners for the Best of British 2022. In May 2022, the song won the Ivor Novello Award for Best Song Musically and Lyrically from the British Academy of Songwriters, Composers, and Authors. It received the 2022 Rolling Stone UK Award for Song of the Year Award.

In the Netherlands the song has featured on the annual Radio 2 Top 2000 all-time chart since 2022, which is broadcast every year between Christmas Day and New Year's Eve on public pop station NPO Radio 2. Despite not registering any success on the weekly pop charts, the song rose to number 490 in the 2025 edition of the Top 2000, its highest position since it was first listed on that chart.

== Background and release ==
The song chronicles Fender's life at 17 when his mother, Shirley was afflicted with fibromyalgia and depressed because she could no longer work after 40 years of service as a nurse. She had become the owner of her apartment at 19 and had never missed a workday. Nevertheless, the Department for Work and Pensions began harassing her with letters and treating her unjustly. Fender was trying to help his mother financially but could not due to his young age. Fender recalled: "That's when my rose-tinted glasses fell off." He told Rolling Stone that it is "a letter to [his] 17 year old self", explaining: "17 is when all the challenges begin: you're not a baby, but you're definitely not an adult, I'm not even sure it'll happen at all for you, but growing up is for fools and the near dead, so stop being so serious all the time".

On 7 July 2021, Fender shared the song and announced it would be the title song from his forthcoming album. It also went viral on TikTok, with users utilising the song to "convey their personal tales of abuse and mistreatment". About the phenomenon, Fender stated to Radio X: "I'm honoured that Seventeen's kind of resonated with people in that way. It's a very special moment for me as a songwriter". In late 2021, an acoustic version of the track, featuring Holly Humberstone, was released.

== Critical reception ==
Rolling Stone called the song a "five minutes of glorious, life-affirming rock and roll". Retro Gazing commented that the song "feels nostalgic and melancholic", and stated It's "a song that so many people can relate to, regardless of what age they're in, though possibly especially for those who have finally had the chance to clearly see their youth in a new, possibly more realistic and understanding, light". Georgie Holland and Scott Colothan of Absolute Radio described "Seventeen Going Under" as an "emphatic, soaring guitar song that collates the struggles of unemployed life, but also the daftness of age where you otherwise have little to fear and the world at your feet." In Tribune magazine, Alex Niven called the song "a triumphant memento vivere for dark times" and commended Fender for "produc[ing] a towering monument to a decade of social injustice and building youthful radicalism which the political mainstream seems determined to try to whitewash."

=== Rankings ===
Critical rankings for "Seventeen Going Under"
Publication	Accolade	Rank	Ref.
NME	The 50 best songs of 2021	4	

== Track listing ==
7" vinyl
No.	Title	Length
1.	"Seventeen Going Under"	5:03
2.	"Howdon Aldi Death Queue"	1:57

Digital download and streaming
No.	Title	Length
1.	"Seventeen Going Under"	5:03
2.	"Seventeen Going Under" (Edit)	3:57
3.	"Howdon Aldi Death Queue"	1:57

Digital download and streaming – explicit
No.	Title	Length
1.	"Seventeen Going Under" (Explicit)	4:57

Digital download and streaming – acoustic
No.	Title	Length
1.	"Seventeen Going Under" (Acoustic)	5:11

== Credits and personnel ==
Credits adapted from AllMusic.

- Alex Borwick – assistant engineer
- Joe Atkinson – synthesizer
- Bramwell Bronte – producer
- Mark Broughton – engineer
- Greg Calbi – mastering engineer
- Johnny Davis – saxophone
- Steve Fallone – mastering engineer
- Sam Fender – composer, glockenspiel, guitar, guitar (acoustic), piano, primary artist, vocals, vocals (background)
- Thom Lewis – percussion, programming
- Drew Michael – drums
- Craig Silvey – mixing
- Dani Spragg – engineer
- Dean Thompson – engineer, guitar
- Tom Ungerer – engineer

== Charts ==
=== Weekly charts ===
Weekly chart performance for "Seventeen Going Under"
Chart (2021–2022)	Peak position
Australia (ARIA)	69
Canada Rock (Billboard)	43
Euro Digital Song Sales (Billboard)	14
Global 200 Excl. US (Billboard)	161
Hungary (Rádiós Top 40)	30
Ireland (IRMA)	4
Netherlands Single Tip (MegaCharts)	1
New Zealand Hot Singles (RMNZ)	13
Sweden (Sverigetopplistan)	96
Switzerland Airplay (Schweizer Hitparade)	79
UK Singles (Official Charts)	3
US Hot Rock & Alternative Songs (Billboard)	24
US Rock & Alternative Airplay (Billboard)	27

=== Year-end charts ===
2022 year-end chart performance for "Seventeen Going Under"
Chart (2022)	Position
UK Singles (OCC)	10
US Adult Alternative Airplay Songs (Billboard)	36
US Alternative Airplay Songs (Billboard)	49

2023 year-end chart performance for "Seventeen Going Under"
Chart (2023)	Position
UK Singles (OCC)	63

2025 year-end chart performance for "Seventeen Going Under"
Chart (2025)	Position
UK Singles (OCC)	77

== Certifications ==
Certifications for "Seventeen Going Under"
Region	Certification	Certified units/sales
New Zealand (RMNZ)	Platinum	30,000^{‡}
United Kingdom (BPI)	5× Platinum	3,000,000^{‡}
^{‡} Sales+streaming figures based on certification alone.

== Release history ==
Release history for "Seventeen Going Under"
Region	Date	Format	Label	Ref.
Various	7 July 2021	Digital download; streaming	Polydor	
United States	31 January 2022	Triple A radio	Polydor; Interscope	
United States	1 February 2022	Alternative radio	Polydor; Interscope	
