= Holly Humberstone =

British singer (born 1999)

- Humberstone in 2021

Background information
- Born: Holly Ffion Humberstone; 17 December 1999 (age 26); Nottingham, England
- Origin: Grantham, Lincolnshire, England
- Genres: Pop; synth-pop; indie rock; alternative rock; pop rock
- Occupations: Musician; singer; songwriter
- Instruments: Vocals; guitar; piano; violin
- Works: Discography; songs recorded
- Years active: 2018–present
- Labels: Platoon; Polydor; Darkroom; Interscope; Geffen
- Website: www.hollyhumberstone.com

Holly Ffion Humberstone (born 17 December 1999) is an English singer and songwriter. She released her debut EP Falling Asleep at the Wheel in 2020, before signing a recording contract with Polydor and Darkroom Records. Her first EP following the signings, The Walls Are Way Too Thin, was released in November 2021; she subsequently won the Brit Award for Rising Star at the 2022 Brit Awards. She has since released two studio albums, Paint My Bedroom Black (2023) and Cruel World (2026), both of which received positive reviews.

== Early life ==
Holly Ffion Humberstone was born on 17 December 1999 in the Queen's Medical Centre in Nottingham. She grew up in Grantham. Humberstone is one of four sisters and her parents are doctors. She studied at Kesteven and Grantham Girls' Grammar School and the Liverpool Institute for Performing Arts.

Humberstone started writing songs at a young age. She has discussed growing up in a small town, stating there was "no music scene growing up in rural Lincolnshire, so I just really did my own thing" in an interview with The Telegraph. Humberstone was formerly a violinist for the Lincolnshire Youth Symphony Orchestra and was first spotted by a manager whilst performing on her local BBC Music Introducing radio show.

== Career ==
=== 2017–2021: Debut and The Walls Are Way Too Thin ===
Humberstone caught attention whilst still in school after performing on BBC Radio Lincolnshire in 2017. Through this Humberstone performed at Glastonbury Festival 2019 on the BBC Music Introducing stage. Her debut single "Deep End" was released on 30 January 2020. Her second single, "Falling Asleep at the Wheel", was released on 19 March, while her third single, "Overkill", was released on 26 June. On 30 July 2020, she released a cover of "Fake Plastic Trees" by the English rock band Radiohead. Her debut EP, also titled Falling Asleep at the Wheel, was released on 14 August, which contained her three previous singles, alongside the tracks "Vanilla", "Drop Dead" and "Livewire". On 9 December 2020, she was included in Vevo DSCVR's Artists to Watch 2021. She performed her song "Vanilla" on the channel.

In March 2021, ahead of the release of her single "Haunted House" and her second EP, Humberstone signed with Polydor Records in the United Kingdom and Darkroom/Interscope Records in the United States. She also signed a publishing deal with Universal Music Publishing Group. On 13 October 2021, Humberstone performed "Scarlett" from her EP The Walls Are Way Too Thin on The Tonight Show Starring Jimmy Fallon. On 9 December 2021, it was announced that Humberstone had been awarded the Brit Award for Rising Star, which recognises pop's most promising new acts to watch. Sam Fender surprised Humberstone with the award whilst they were recording an acoustic duet of his song "Seventeen Going Under".

=== 2022–2024: Paint My Bedroom Black and tours ===
On 21 January 2022, she released the single "London is Lonely". Humberstone was the opening act for Girl in Red's Make It Go Quiet Tour of North America in March 2022, as well as the opening act for the second half of the North American leg of Olivia Rodrigo's Sour Tour. Also in March 2022, The Walls Are Way Too Thin won the Best Mixtape accolade at the 2022 NME Awards. After a string of standalone singles including "Sleep Tight", she released a compilation album of her music released at that point in time, Can You Afford to Lose Me?. It was made available on 24 October 2022. In June 2023, she announced that her debut album would be titled Paint My Bedroom Black. It was released on 13 October 2023 and was promoted with three singles: "Antichrist", "Room Service" and "Superbloodmoon", the latter most of which featured American artist d4vd. The track was removed from streaming services following allegations of d4vd's involvement in the case of Celeste Rivas Hernandez. In July 2023, she was featured on the song "Diving" by British band Bombay Bicycle Club.

In February 2024, Humberstone released Dive and announced her third EP Work In Progress would be released on 15 March, noting that the track listing was composed of demos she had forgotten about, as opposed to a typical deluxe album. On 5 August 2024, she was announced as an opener for the 16 August 2024 show of Taylor Swift's The Eras Tour.

=== 2025–present: Cruel World ===
In mid-2025, Humberstone returned to musical releases with a contribution to the soundtrack for The Buccaneers, the song "Miss You to Death". Months later, she confirmed that a "new world" was beginning, hinting towards the start of a new album cycle. She thanked fans on social media for "waiting for [her] to get it right". Humberstone then released the single "Die Happy" on 5 November 2025. Her second studio album, Cruel World, was announced on 23 January 2026, accompanying the release of its second single, "To Love Somebody", which Humberstone performed during a 28 January appearance on The Tonight Show in the U.S. The album was released on 10 April 2026. In June, Humberstone released It's a Real Cruel World, an EP composed of four reimagined versions of songs from the album.

Humberstone contributed the original song "Embers in the Sky" to the 2026 video game Life Is Strange: Reunion.

== Musical style and influences ==
Humberstone's music has been described as pop, synth-pop, indie rock, alternative rock and pop rock. Her music style has been compared to artists such as Lorde and Bon Iver given its intimate and atmospheric style. Humberstone cites Damien Rice, Ben Howard, Phoebe Bridgers and Haim as musical inspirations. Rice's debut studio album O (2002) is considered by Humberstone to be her "first favourite album". She has stated she mostly identifies with "female writers who overshare" and has described her own musical style as "quite self-exposing".

== Discography ==
- Paint My Bedroom Black (2023)
- Cruel World (2026)

== Concert tours ==
=== Headlining ===
- Deep End Tour (2021)
- Sleep Tight Tour (2022)
- This Feels Like The Truman Show (2024)
- The Holly Humberstone Show (2024)
- The Cruel World Tour (2026–2027)

=== Supporting ===
- Divinely Uninspired to a Hellish Extent Tour (Lewis Capaldi, 2019–2020)
- The Sour Tour (Olivia Rodrigo, 2022)
- Make It Go Quiet Tour (Girl in Red, 2022)
- The Eras Tour (Taylor Swift, 2024)
- People Watching Tour (Sam Fender, 2024–2025)
- The Look at My Life Tour (Gracie Abrams, 2026)

== Awards and nominations ==
Year	Organisation	Category	Nominee(s)/work(s)	Result	Ref.
2021	Ivor Novello Awards	Rising Star	Herself	Nominated	
2021	BBC	Sound of...	Herself	2nd	
2022	Brit Awards	Rising Star	Herself	Won	
2022	NME Awards	Best Mixtape	The Walls Are Way Too Thin	Won	
2022	Ivor Novello Awards	Best Song Musically and Lyrically	"Haunted House"	Nominated	
2026	Berlin Music Video Awards	Best Song	"Beauty Pageant"	Nominated	
