= Falling Asleep at the Wheel (EP) =

2020 EP by Holly Humberstone

EP by Holly Humberstone
- Released: 14 August 2020
- Genre: Pop-soul
- Length: 19:18
- Label: Platoon
- Producer: Rob Milton

Holly Humberstone chronology
Falling Asleep at the Wheel (2020)	The Walls Are Way Too Thin (2021)

Falling Asleep at the Wheel is the debut extended play by English singer-songwriter Holly Humberstone. It was released on 14 August 2020 through Platoon Records. Dealing with themes including mental health toxic relationships, Humberstone co-wrote the EP alongside Rob Milton, who produced it in its entirety. It was written in her childhood home in Grantham over the course of two years. Humberstone recalled some of the tracks being written as lyrical pieces before having production, while others began with Milton's production.

Falling Asleep at the Wheel was praised by critics, receiving complimentary reviews from media outlets including The New York Times, NME and Variety. They commended Humberstone's vocal ability as well as her lyricism, feeling that a bright new talent had been found. Despite minor comparisons to established artists, it was acknowledged that Humberstone had formed her own musical identity within the debut project.

== Background and release ==
Humberstone began writing songs at a young age. She has discussed growing up in a small town, stating there was "no music scene growing up in rural Lincolnshire, so I just really did my own thing". She became a violinist for the Lincolnshire Youth Symphony Orchestra and was spotted by a manager whilst performing on her local BBC Music Introducing radio show. She then performed at Glastonbury Festival 2019 on the BBC Music Introducing stage. Humberstone's debut single "Deep End" was then released on 30 January 2020.

== Composition ==
Over the course of two years, Humberstone co-wrote the EP with Rob Milton, who also produced it in its entirety. Milton had heard Humberstone on the radio and reached out to work with her. Benjamin Francis Leftwich and Frances also received various writing credits, respectively. Humberstone and Milton quickly formed a mutual agreement on the type of songs they wanted to create together. They wanted to make the lyrics "very personal and heartbreaking" and wanted to achieve longevity with what they wrote. Humberstone explained that the pair aimed to write "lyrics that someone would get tattooed on their skin for life", adding: "if they're not tattoo lyrics, then they don't make the record." The majority of the EP was written in Humberstone's childhood home in Grantham. Various songs, including "Deep End" and "Drop Dead, were written lyrically first, while others began with their production.

"Deep End", the opening track of Falling Asleep at the Wheel, was written about Humberstone's sister having depression. Detailing the "ice cold grip" that depression has on her sister, "Deep End" was titled "unbearably sad", although retaining a sense of compassion throughout. It was likened to the work of Phoebe Bridgers. The titular track of the EP follows; the lyrical content of the song explores emotions slowly destroying both a relationship and the people involved. Humberstone loved the "dark, wonky sonics" of the track and felt it defined her as a musician. "Overkill", the third track on the EP, contains one of Humberstone's favourite lyrics from the project: "A couple more tequilas, and I'll tell you how I'm feeling". She positively remembered writing "Overkill" with Milton and Leftwich, as she was going through something positive at the time and felt good about the track.

"Drop Dead" is the fourth song on the EP and was compared to Lorde's "Still Sane". It was described by NME as a "moody ballad" with a "pattern of ambient, barely-there beats as gently throbbing rhythms make their presence felt". "Vanilla", the fifth track, contains "plain-spoken, exuding honesty and refreshing candour". It dissects having a boring partner and enjoying life when Humberstone is not by their side. The closing track, "Livewire", was billed as an "ambient, poignant heart-on-sleeve piano ballad" by Atwood Magazine.

== Critical reception ==
The New York Times praised the EP, writing: "song after song is a striking blend of offhand conversation and acutely detailed storytelling, verses that feel like whispers into the ear of an intimate." They also praised Humberstone's vocal ability, which they described as "fluttery and precise, and also oozy, hanging over her songs like low, enveloping fog". NME also praised Falling Asleep at the Wheel, giving it 5 stars in their review. They commended track "Deep End", labelling it a track that will "leave you floored on first listen". Variety complimented Humberstone's "lovely and versatile voice". They wrote that although there are "flashes of several other artists in her songs", the EP sees her musical identity almost fully formed. The Indiependent acknowledged that it would be easy to compare Humberstone, like any new singer, to established artists. However, they felt it would be "an injustice" to compare her to others, writing: "this striking debut has such emotional depth that it signals the arrival of a bright new talent". They praised her raw lyricism and her versatility for genres on the album.

== Track listing ==
Falling Asleep at the Wheel track listing
No.	Title	Writer(s)	Producer(s)	Length
1.	"Deep End"	Holly Ffion Humberstone; Robert James Milton; Benjamin Francis Leftwich	Milton	2:51
2.	"Falling Asleep at the Wheel"	Humberstone; Milton	Milton	3:23
3.	"Overkill"	Humberstone; Milton; Leftwich	Milton	3:06
4.	"Drop Dead"	Humberstone; Sophie Frances Cooke	Milton	2:57
5.	"Vanilla"	Humberstone; Milton	Milton	3:44
6.	"Livewire"	Humberstone; Milton	Milton	3:14
Total length:				19:18

== Charts ==
Chart performance for Falling Asleep at the Wheel
Chart (2020)	Peak position
Swiss Albums (Schweizer Hitparade)	63
