= The Walls Are Way Too Thin =

EP by Holly Humberstone
- Released: 12 November 2021
- Length: 20:51
- Labels: Polydor; Darkroom; Interscope
- Producers: Rob Milton; Matthew Healy

Holly Humberstone chronology
Falling Asleep at the Wheel (2020)	The Walls Are Way Too Thin (2021)	Can You Afford to Lose Me? (2022)

Professional ratings
Aggregate scores
Source	Rating
Metacritic	86/100
Review scores
Source	Rating
Flood Magazine	7/10
Gigwise	7/10
NME	4/5 stars
Under the Radar	8/10

The Walls Are Way Too Thin is the second extended play (EP) by the English singer and songwriter Holly Humberstone, released on 5 November 2021.

== Release ==
On 5 August 2021, Holly Humberstone announced the release of her second EP The Walls Are Way Too Thin alongside co-writer Matty Healy of the 1975.

== Critical reception ==
The Walls Are Way Too Thin was met with widespread critical acclaim from critics. At Metacritic, which assigns a weighted average rating out of 100 to reviews from mainstream publications, this release received an average score of 86 based on 4 reviews, which indicates "universal acclaim".

In a review for Gigwise, writer Harrison Smith wrote: "Humberstone dives headfirst into first-person narratives, romantic woes and poignant self-discovery on this latest offering. The charming lyrical honesty, infectious groove and playful energy throughout make The Walls Are Way Too Thin a coltish example of Humberstone's dynamic talent and spirit. At Under the Radar, Andy Von Pip said: "The Walls Are Way Too Thin EP provides proof positive that Humberstone is perhaps the brightest Gen Z singer/songwriter to emerge from the U.K. in quite some time. The EP deals with a sense of displacement, of messy relationships, of things falling apart, both physically and emotionally, and attempting to move on whilst trying to find your place in the world."

== Track listing ==
The Walls Are Way Too Thin track listing
No.	Title	Writer(s)	Producer(s)	Length
1.	"Haunted House"	Holly Ffion Humberstone; Robert James Milton; Sarah Aarons	Milton	2:13
2.	"The Walls Are Way Too Thin"	Humberstone; Milton	Milton	3:41
3.	"Please Don't Leave Just Yet"	Humberstone; Milton; Matthew Healy	Milton; Healy	3:49
4.	"Thursday"	Humberstone; Milton	Milton	4:07
5.	"Scarlett"	Humberstone; Milton	Milton	3:16
6.	"Friendly Fire"	Humberstone; Milton; Benjamin Francis Leftwich	Milton	3:42
Total length:				20:51

== Charts ==
Chart performance for The Walls Are Way Too Thin
Chart (2021)	Peak position
Scottish Albums (Official Charts)	35
UK Albums (Official Charts)	64
