= Paint My Bedroom Black =

- Standard cover

Studio album by Holly Humberstone
- Released: 13 October 2023
- Genres: Pop; alternative pop
- Length: 41:57
- Labels: Polydor; Darkroom; Geffen
- Producers: Noah Conrad; Ethan Gruska; Rob Milton; Parisi; Jonah Summerfield

Holly Humberstone chronology
Can You Afford to Lose Me? (2022)	Paint My Bedroom Black (2023)	Work in Progress (2024)

Singles from Paint My Bedroom Black
- 1. "Antichrist" Released: 28 June 2023; 2. "Room Service" Released: 28 June 2023; 3. "Superbloodmoon" Released: 28 July 2023; 4. "Into Your Room" Released: 21 September 2023; 5. "Kissing in Swimming Pools" Released: 5 October 2023; 6. "Paint My Bedroom Black" Released: 11 October 2023

Paint My Bedroom Black is the debut studio album by the English singer and songwriter Holly Humberstone, released on 13 October 2023 by Polydor, Darkroom and Geffen Records.

== Background ==
In 2020, Holly Humberstone broke out with the release of her single "Falling Asleep at the Wheel". In November 2021, Humberstone's second extended play (EP) The Walls Are Way Too Thin was released to positive critical reception. In April and May 2022, Humberstone toured as a supporting act with Olivia Rodrigo on her Sour Tour.

On 29 June 2023, Paint My Bedroom Black was announced to be releasing on 13 October.

== Singles ==
On 28 June 2023, the tracks "Antichrist" and "Room Service" were released simultaneously as a double A-side single. "Antichrist" is about a breakup Humberstone experienced where she felt she was "inevitably going to have to hurt the person who I wanted so much to love". The music video for "Antichrist" was shot in an abandoned hospital in the Czech Republic which Humberstone claimed was "definitely haunted". "Room Service" was written by Humberstone while touring with Olivia Rodrigo when she was "missing home and my friends" and felt she "was being left behind" in being away from home on tour. The music video for "Room Service" debuted on 12 July 2023.

The third single "Superbloodmoon", a collaboration with d4vd, was released on 28 July 2023.

== Release and promotion ==
Paint My Bedroom Black is available in black and purple coloured vinyl formats, both of which are 140g pressings produced using 100% recycled eco-mix vinyl material. The purple coloured vinyl LP comes with an alternate album cover. An exclusive 140g light blue-coloured vinyl edition with a black album cover is available from Humberstone's official website shop.

== Critical reception ==
Professional ratings
Aggregate scores
Source	Rating
Metacritic	75/100
Review scores
Source	Rating
DIY	4/5 stars
Evening Standard	3/5 stars
The Line of Best Fit	6/10
The Guardian	4/5 stars
The Independent	3/5 stars
NME	4/5 stars
The Skinny	3/5 stars
The Telegraph	3/5 stars

Paint My Bedroom Black received a score of 75 out of 100 on review aggregator Metacritic based on thirteen critics' reviews, indicating "generally favorable" reception. DIY's Ben Tipple commented that the album is "at once escapist and heavily personal" and "a dark, pop-perfect, melancholic fantasy". Maya Georgi of Rolling Stone called it "an amalgamation of flashing colors, moving from cerulean blue to super blood moon orange at hyper-speed" and opined that it "doubles down on her voracious honesty, laying bare her deepest regrets, doom scroll nights, and drinking habits". Reviewing the album for The Line of Best Fit, Emma Thimgren found it to be "full of slick melodies and the songs are so very neatly crafted, yet the reach towards a bigger sound loses the immediacy between Humberstone and the listener". Emma Cooper-Raeburn of The Skinny felt that the "influences of Damien Rice and Phoebe Bridgers are evident throughout" the album, which "demonstrates Humberstone's progress in her talent and career [...] although all of the tracks on the record blend seamlessly together, many sadly sound similar to the last".

Rolling Stone mentioned Paint My Bedroom Black as one of the best albums of 2023. NME placed the album at number 39 on their compilation of the 50 best albums of 2023, stating that it was "filled with everything that she does best: diaristic confessions on friendships, crushes and heartbreaks; softly-sung lyrics; brooding melodies for fans to escape within".

== Track listing ==
Paint My Bedroom Black track listing
No.	Title	Writer(s)	Producer(s)	Length
1.	"Paint My Bedroom Black"	Holly Humberstone; Rob Milton	Milton	3:49
2.	"Into Your Room"	Humberstone; Ethan Gruska; Milton	Milton; Gruska	3:29
3.	"Cocoon"	Humberstone; Milton	Milton	3:06
4.	"Kissing in Swimming Pools"	Humberstone; Milton	Milton	4:47
5.	"Ghost Me"	Humberstone; Benjamin Leftwich; Milton	Milton	3:37
6.	"Superbloodmoon" (featuring D4vd (Note: "Superbloodmoon" was removed from streaming services in October 2025.))	Humberstone; David Burke; Scott Harris; Milton	Milton	2:31
7.	"Antichrist"	Humberstone; Ines Dunn; Milton	Milton	3:20
8.	"Lauren"	Humberstone; Gruska; Milton	Milton; Gruska	2:58
9.	"Baby Blues"	Humberstone; Milton; Giampaolo Parisi; Marco Parisi	Milton; Parisi	1:18
10.	"Flatlining"	Humberstone; Noah Conrad; Milton; Jonah Summerfield	Milton; Conrad; Summerfield	3:02
11.	"Elvis Impersonators"	Humberstone; Conrad; Milton; Summerfield	Milton; Conrad; Summerfield	2:52
12.	"Girl"	Humberstone; Conrad; Milton; Summerfield	Milton; Conrad; Summerfield	3:22
13.	"Room Service"	Humberstone; Milton	Milton	3:46
Total length:				41:57

DTC Acoustic CD and cassette bonus tracks
No.	Title	Writer(s)	Length
14.	"Into Your Room"	Humberstone; Gruska; Milton	3:35
15.	"Cocoon"	Humberstone; Milton	3:21
16.	"Antichrist"	Humberstone; Dunn; Milton	3:35
17.	"Paint My Bedroom Black"	Humberstone; Milton	4:02
Total length:			56:30

DTC Voicenotes CD and cassette bonus tracks
No.	Title	Writer(s)	Length
14.	"Roadside Flowers"	Humberstone; Milton; Johnny Coffer	2:54
15.	"Ghost Me"	Humberstone; Leftwich; Milton	3:35
16.	"Easy Does It"	Humberstone; Milton; Conrad; Summerfield	2:29
17.	"Kissing in Swimming Pools"	Humberstone; Milton	4:49
Total length:			55:44

=== Notes ===
- ^[a] – "Superbloodmoon" was removed from streaming services in October 2025.
- Acoustic edition bonus tracks are subtitled "Acoustic" and were produced by Milton.
- Voicenotes edition bonus tracks are subtitled "Voicenote" and were produced by Humberstone.

== Personnel ==
- Holly Humberstone – vocals, background vocals (all tracks); piano (tracks 1, 5, 7, Acoustic tracks), tambourine (4), vibraphone (8), guitar (Voicenotes tracks); acoustic guitar, Wurlitzer organ (Acoustic tracks)
- Matt Colton – mastering (1–13, Acoustic tracks)
- Jeremy Cooper - mastering (Voicenotes tracks)
- Lee Smith – mixing (1–13, Acoustic tracks), drums (4–7)
- Rob Milton – synthesizer (1–13), guitar (1–12, Acoustic tracks), programming (1–3, 5, 6, 8, 10–12), percussion (1, 4, 7, 12, Acoustic tracks), bass (3, 5, 6), background vocals (3, 11, 13), keyboards (6), acoustic guitar (13, Acoustic tracks), piano synthesizer (Acoustic tracks)
- Ethan Gruska – synthesizer (2, 8); guitar, programming (2); bass, drums, percussion (8)
- Rob Slater – drums (3, 7)
- Max Clilverd – pedal steel (4, 5)
- Angelica Bomford – cello (4)
- Julian Bayliss – conductor, piano (4)
- Joseph Lowe – viola (4)
- Anastasia Vaina – violin (4)
- Chloë Meade – violin (4)
- Benjamin Leftwich – guitar (5)
- Jamie Lockhart – strings (5)
- D4vd – vocals, background vocals (6)
- Giampaolo Parisi – programming, synthesizer, vocal programming (9)
- Marco Parisi – programming, synthesizer, vocal programming (9)
- Noah Conrad – piano, synthesizer (10–12); guitar (11)
- Jonah Summerfield – programming, synthesizer (10–12)

== Charts ==
Chart performance for Paint My Bedroom Black
Chart (2023)	Peak position
Australian Hitseekers Albums (ARIA)	15
Belgian Albums (Ultratop Flanders)	94
Scottish Albums (Official Charts)	3
UK Albums (Official Charts)	5

== Release history ==
Release dates and formats for Paint My Bedroom Black
Region	Date	Format(s)	Label	Ref.
Various	13 October 2023	CD; digital download; LP; streaming	Polydor	
