= Scarlett (surname) =

Scarlett is an English name of Norman French origin and is a metonymic occupational surname for a dyer or a seller of rich, brightly coloured cloth, often of a brilliant, vivid red colour. The derivation of the name is from the Old French word "Escarlate", scarlet, which by 1182 was already being used as the name of a cloth, particularly bright red cloth. The ultimate derivation is from the Latin "scarlata". The modern surname can be found in either of two forms: Scarlet or Scarlett.

== Notable people ==
Notable people with the surname include:

- Baron Abinger several people including:
  - James Scarlett, 1st Baron Abinger (1769–1844)
  - Robert Scarlett, 2nd Baron Abinger (1794–1861)
  - William Scarlett, 3rd Baron Abinger (1826–1892)
  - James Scarlett, 4th Baron Abinger (1871–1903)
  - Shelley Scarlett, 5th Baron Abinger (1872–1917)
  - Robert Scarlett, 6th Baron Abinger (1876–1927)
  - Hugh Scarlett, 7th Baron Abinger (1878–1943)
  - James Scarlett, 8th Baron Abinger (1914–2002)
- Andre Scarlett (born 1980), English professional footballer
- Austin Scarlett (born 1983), US fashion designers and artists
- Brian Scarlett (1938–2004) British particle technologist
- Connor Scarlett (born 1992), British actor
- Dane Scarlett (born 2004), English professional footballer
- Francis Muir Scarlett (1891–1971), United States District Judge
- Francis Scarlett (1875–1934), Royal Air Force commander
- Fred Scarlett (born 1975), British rower
- Hunter Scarlett (1885–1954), American ophthalmologist and college footballer
- James Yorke Scarlett (1799–1871), British general and hero of the Crimean War
- John Scarlett (footballer) (1947–2019), Australian rules footballer
- John Scarlett (Toronto) (1777–1865), Canadian merchant
- John McLeod Scarlett (born 1948), head of the British Secret Intelligence Service, commonly known as MI6
- Ken Scarlett (born 1927), Australian Writer
- Liam Scarlett (1986-2021), British choreographer
- Lynn Scarlett, American environmental policy analyst
- Mary J. Scarlett Dixon (1822-1900), American physician
- Matthew Scarlett (born 1979), Australian footballer
- Niara Scarlett, British singer-songwriter
- Peter Campbell Scarlett (1804–1881), British diplomat
- Sir Peter W.S.Y. Scarlett (1905–1987), British diplomat
- Reginald Scarlett (1934-2019), West Indian cricketer
- Robert Scarlett (born 1979), Jamaican footballer
- Robert Dalley-Scarlett (1887–1959), Australian organist, choirmaster and composer
- Ron Scarlett (1911–2002), New Zealand paleozoologist
- Sir William Anglin Scarlett (1777–1831), Chief Justice of Jamaica

== Fictional characters ==
- Remilia Scarlet and Flandre Scarlet, from the Japanese video game franchise Touhou Project
- Will Scarlet, one of Robin Hood's "Merry Men"

== See also ==
- Scarlett (disambiguation)
