= Jane Shelley =

English biographer (1820–1899)

- Born: 1820
- Died: 1899 (aged 78–79)
- Spouse: Percy Florence Shelley

Lady Jane Shelley (née Gibson, other married name St John, 1820–1899) was an English noblewoman who published on the Shelley family. The wife of Sir Percy Florence Shelley 3rd Baronet, the only surviving child of Mary Shelley and Percy Bysshe Shelley, Lady Jane attempted to control the legacy of her parents-in-law by publishing accounts of them and commissioning biographies of Percy Bysshe Shelley which portrayed him in a positive light. When she objected to Thomas Jefferson Hogg's The Life of Percy Bysshe Shelley, she published The Shelley Memorials: From Authentic Sources in 1858 and commissioned another biography by Edward Dowden. She also commissioned the Shelley Memorial.

== Life ==
Jane Gibson was born in 1820, one of nine illegitimate children of banker Thomas Gibson and Ann Shevill. In 1832, when her father died, she and one of her younger brothers were sent to live with their paternal aunt in the Lake District. In 1841, she married Charles St John, the youngest son of George St John, 3rd Viscount Bolingbroke, and cared for him until his death in 1844. She then became guardian of her husband's illegitimate son, Charles Robert St John. These extramarital relationships were concealed until 1985.

In 1847, Jane met Mary Shelley and her son Percy Florence Shelley. They became engaged in March 1848 and married in June that year. Jane brought £15000 into the family, which allowed Mary and Percy Florence to become debt-free. Mary Shelley moved in with them at Field Place, Warnham in July. The three of them lived and travelled together from then on. In 1849, they encountered some friction with Mary's sister-in-law Claire Clairmont. On one occasion, Lady Jane had to intervene when Claire was pressuring her niece, Clara, to pretend to be married. Later, Claire accused Mary and Lady Jane of poorly chaperoning Clara when she met Percy Florence's friend, the writer Alexander Andrew Knox, at their house, and became engaged to him within a week. Claire fell out with Mary as she held that the Shelleys had encouraged the marriage. Lady Jane later said that Mary had opposed the marriage, which turned out to be a happy one.

Lady Jane cared for Mary until the latter's death in 1851.

Lady Jane and Sir Percy Florence Shelley adopted Lady Jane's niece from her first marriage, Bessie Florence Gibson, who married Lieutenant Colonel Leopold Scarlett and became the mother of Shelley, Robert and Hugh Scarlett, the 5th, 6th and 7th barons Abinger.

== Works ==
The Shelley Memorial was commissioned by Lady Jane Shelley in 1890

Lady Jane Shelley dedicated herself to the legacy of Percy Bysshe Shelley. At first, she collected material about Percy Bysshe to provide to Thomas Jefferson Hogg, whom she had commissioned to write a biography of him. Two volumes of The Life of Percy Bysshe Shelley were published in 1858, but the Shelley family objected to Hogg's portrayal of Percy Bysshe and terminated the project. Lady Jane published The Shelley Memorials: From Authentic Sources in 1859 and compiled volumes called Shelley and Mary for private circulation in 1882. She then commissioned Edward Dowden to write a new biography, which was published in 1886. She conducted interviews and collected newspaper articles and reviews to provide material for him and closely oversaw the project. Throughout her efforts, Lady Jane endeavoured to suppress irregular information and portray the Shelleys in a positive light. For example, her projects avoid references to Claire Clairmont or to Percy Bysshe's first wife Harriet Westbrook and do not mention his mother, Elizabeth Shelley, at all.

Lady Jane commissioned a marble and bronze sculpture to commemorate Percy Bysshe in 1890. It was crafted by Edward Onslow Ford. When the sculpture was found to be too large for its intended plot in the Protestant Cemetery in Rome, Lady Jane contributed £500 towards a building to house it at University College, Oxford, where it remains.
