= Scarlet (comics) =

Scarlet or Scarlett, in comics, may refer to:

- Scarlet (Icon Comics), a 2010 series from writer Brian Michael Bendis
- Scarlet (DC Comics), a sidekick to Jason Todd's Red Hood from Batman and Robin
- Scarlett (DC Comics), a 1993 DC Comics series
- Scarlett (G.I. Joe), a G.I. Joe character who appeared in the spin-off comics
- Mr. Scarlet, a Fawcett Comics superhero later drafted into the DC Universe
- Miss Scarlet, a character from the 2000 AD story Stickleback

It may also refer to:

- Scarlet Centurion, an alias used by a number of Marvel Comics characters
- Scarlet Knights (comics), a Marvel Comics superhero team
- Scarlet Scarab, a number of Marvel Comics characters
- Scarlet Scorpion, an AC Comics character and member of the Sentinels of Justice
- Scarlet Spider, the alias for a number of Marvel Comics characters
- Scarlet Traces, a Dark Horse series from Ian Edginton and D'Israeli
- Scarlet Witch, a Marvel Comics superhero

== See also ==
- Scarlet (disambiguation)
- Scarlett (disambiguation)
