= Scarlett =

Scarlett may refer to:

== People ==
- Scarlett (given name), a feminine name including list of persons and characters with the name
- Scarlett (surname)
- Scarlett (gamer) (Sasha Hostyn), professional video game player

== Places ==
- Scarlett Place, a high-rise residential facility in Baltimore, Maryland.
- Scarlett Point, a location on Montagu Island, in the South Sandwich Islands
- Scarlett Point, near Castletown, Isle of Man
- Scarlett Road, a street in Toronto, Ontario, Canada

== Arts and entertainment ==
- Scarlett (musical), a 1970 musical based on the novel Gone with the Wind
- Scarlett (Cassidy novel), a 2006 novel by Cathy Cassidy
- Scarlett (Ripley novel), a 1991 novel by Alexandra Ripley
- Scarlett (miniseries), a 1994 television adaptation loosely based on the novel Scarlett by Alexandra Ripley
- Scarlett, a 2006 TV movie starring Rebecca Gayheart directed by Steve Miner
- Scarlett (2018 film), an Italian thriller film directed by Luigi Boccia
- "Scarlett", a 1995 song by Closterkeller from the album Scarlet
- Project Scarlett, working name of the Xbox Series X
- Scarlett Pictures, an Australian film production company
- Scarlett (song), a 2021 song by Holly Humberstone

== Other uses ==
- Scarlett (cat) (1995–2008), a feline who received worldwide media attention for saving her kittens
- Scarlett, a product line of audio USB-interfaces by Focusrite

== See also ==
- Scarlet (disambiguation)
- Scarlett Martínez International Airport, international airport serving Río Hato, Mexico
