= Monument to Edward Onslow Ford =

Monument on Abbey Road in London

Coordinates: 51.5319°N 0.1771°W

Edward Onslow Ford
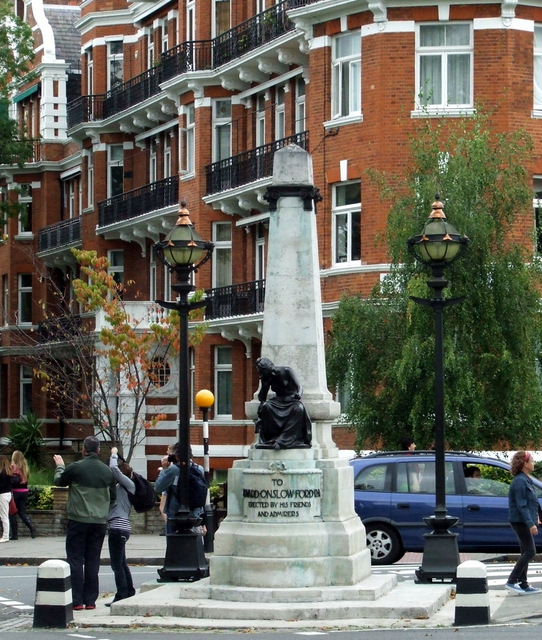
- Artist: John William Simpson and Andrea Carlo Lucchesi
- Completion date: c. 1901
- Subject: Edward Onslow Ford
- Location: London

Listed Building – Grade II
- Official name: Monument to Edward Onslow Ford,including Pair of Lamp Standards
- Designated: 9 January 1970
- Reference no.: 1066531

The Monument to Edward Onslow Ford is a Grade II listed monument on Abbey Road in St John's Wood, London, near Ford's former home. Onslow Ford was himself a sculptor and would produce many memorials and monuments in his own lifetime.

The monument was erected around 1901 unveiled by Lawrence Alma-Tadema, with artists such as John William Simpson and Andrea Carlo Lucchesi involved in the design. It takes the form of a Portland stone obelisk with bronze detailing including a relief bust of Onslow Ford by Lucchesi and on the obverse side a copy of Ford's Muse taken from his Shelley Memorial by Simpson. The monument is listed alongside the two ornamented lamps to either side. An inscription on the monument reads 'To thine own self be true', a quote from Hamlet.

Ford was a member of the New Sculpture movement, with strong influences from Alfred Gilbert. The memorial was set up by friends, colleagues and admirers with whom Ford was popular.
