= Andrea Lucchesi (disambiguation) =

Andrea Lucchesi may refer to:

- Andrea Luchesi (1741–1801), or Lucchesi, Italian composer
- Andrea Carlo Lucchesi (1859–1925), Anglo-Italian sculptor
