= Helen M. Moore =

American author and editor (1862 – 1954)

Helen Maria Moore (August 2, 1862 – August 2, 1954) was an American author, librarian, and editor who wrote the first biography published on the life of Mary Shelley, the English author of Frankenstein.

== Life and career ==
=== Early life and education ===
Helen Maria Moore was born on August 2, 1862, in Dubuque, Iowa. Her parents were Eben N. Moore, a pharmacist, and Lucy Green Cleveland Moore. Her siblings were Henry Cleveland Moore (1860–1881) and Elizabeth Putnam Moore (1865–1943). The family lived in Iowa until 1880 and then moved to Chicago, Illinois. It was here that Moore attended a private school with a focus in literature and Latin.

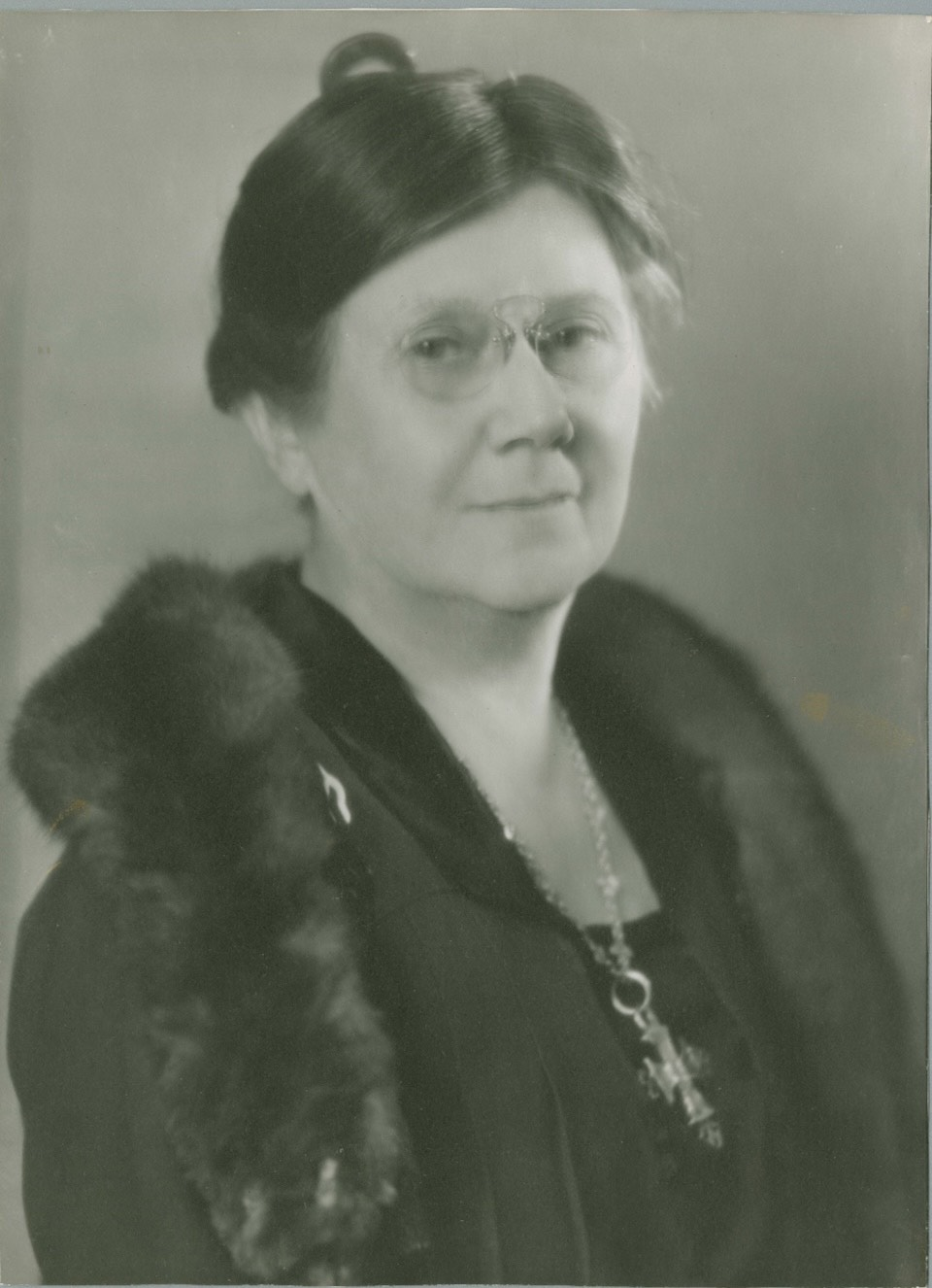
Helen Moore circa 1930.

Another move in 1883 relocated the family to Philadelphia, where Moore continued her education at the Pennsylvania Academy of Fine Arts (PAFA). She took life drawing classes that year under the instruction of controversial artist Thomas Eakins. Moore attended PAFA for just one year, before continuing her education at New York University.

=== Mary Shelley ===
In August 1885 Moore wrote to Percy Florence Shelley, expressing her admiration of his mother, Mary Shelley, and wished to write her biography. The following summer in 1886, Moore's book, Mary Wollstonecraft Shelley, was published by the J. B. Lippincott Company of Philadelphia. Lippincott was an associate of her former instructor Eakins. Promotion of the book resulted in reviews and advertisements in newspapers across the country. The book was priced at $1.25, and the reviews were generally favorable for the young author's first book. The National Republican in Washington D.C. wrote" Helen Moore's part is well done, carefully, tenderly, appreciatively, and the warmest public applause, to which she is certainly entitled, we may confidently expect to be her reward." A New Orleans paper said "Miss Moore has accomplished a labor of love in preparing this tribute to the genius, the personal worth and loveableness of one comparatively so little known sister-women. She has availed herself of the liberal advantages of the Boston, Athenaeum and Public libraries in its preparation, and not only sets in order the epochs of the outer and inner life of Mary Shelley, but analyzes her separate works in considerable detail, with impartial discussion of their respective merits and shortcomings and of the inadaptability of most of them to contemporary standards of sentiment and literary style." However, the Chicago Tribune stated, "the authoress gives her imagination too free a scope for a book of this description."

=== Travels and Walt Whitman ===
Following the release of the book, Moore began correspondence with Percy Ives, a former classmate at PAFA. She wrote that she would be traveling to France with her mother and sister. Ives, already in Paris and studying at the Beaux-Arts, arranged accommodations for the Moore family who arrived in September. While in Paris, Ives escorted the women to the local museums and gardens. In October Moore left her mother and sister in Paris and traveled to England, returning to the United States in November. Ives wrote to family friend Walt Whitman and asked if he would be willing to meet with Moore upon her return. The letter is held at the Library of Congress, although it is unknown if Whitman and Moore ever met.

=== Librarian in Manhattan ===
By 1890 Moore and her family had moved to Manhattan where Moore became the first paid librarian for the University Settlement Society, a charity organization that assisted immigrants in the city. Moore's annual reports and firm belief in the need of children's books were often quoted in the press. She wrote "Tenement Neighborhood Idea – University Settlement" that was included with other authors and published in 1893, in a book titled "The Literature of Philanthropy". The New York Times published an article in 1896 "Work Among the Poor" where Moore said "The twelve months just passed have been a history of progress and prosperity. Since January we have received a sufficient number of volumes, so that admission is no longer refused for actual lack of books. Now, when children are turned away, it is because the capacity of space and our slender resources are taxed to the utmost, and half who apply cannot be admitted." She concluded her report with "It is the cry not only of the children that we hear, but of the young citizens, who, oppressed by the standards of civic life that surround them, consciously reach out for the records of noble deeds - 'the lives of great men' - that shall teach them how to make their own sublime." Before leaving the University Settlement Society in 1900, Moore had established a library that began with 400 books and had grown to a collection of 5,000. Three years later the library was absorbed into the New York City Public Library.

=== Research, social policy and later life ===
Over the next few years Moore continued to write from home while living with her parents and sister. In 1909, she began working for a second organization, the Russell Sage Foundation. She would remain there for the next 37 years as a research editor, editing several hundred books and pamphlets over the course of her long career. Moore also served as a member of the education committee of the New York State Commission on Immigration and retired at the age of 84 in 1946. She never married or had children and spent her last years in a Fairfield, Connecticut nursing home. She died on her 92nd birthday in 1954, leaving the bulk of her estate to close friend, Ethel Mason Eaton. Eaton, a fellow writer and widow with two children, had met Moore through literary connections. A "Pioneer in Social Work", Moore's obituary was published in several states and credited her with "establishing the first recognized children's library in the country" and one of the first social workers to aid immigrant families in New York City slums.

Moore died in 1954.

== Selected publications ==
- Moore, Helen (1886). Mary Wollstonecraft Shelley. Philadelphia: J.B. Lippincott. OCLC 1111168968.
