= Edward Onslow Ford =

English sculptor (1852–1901)

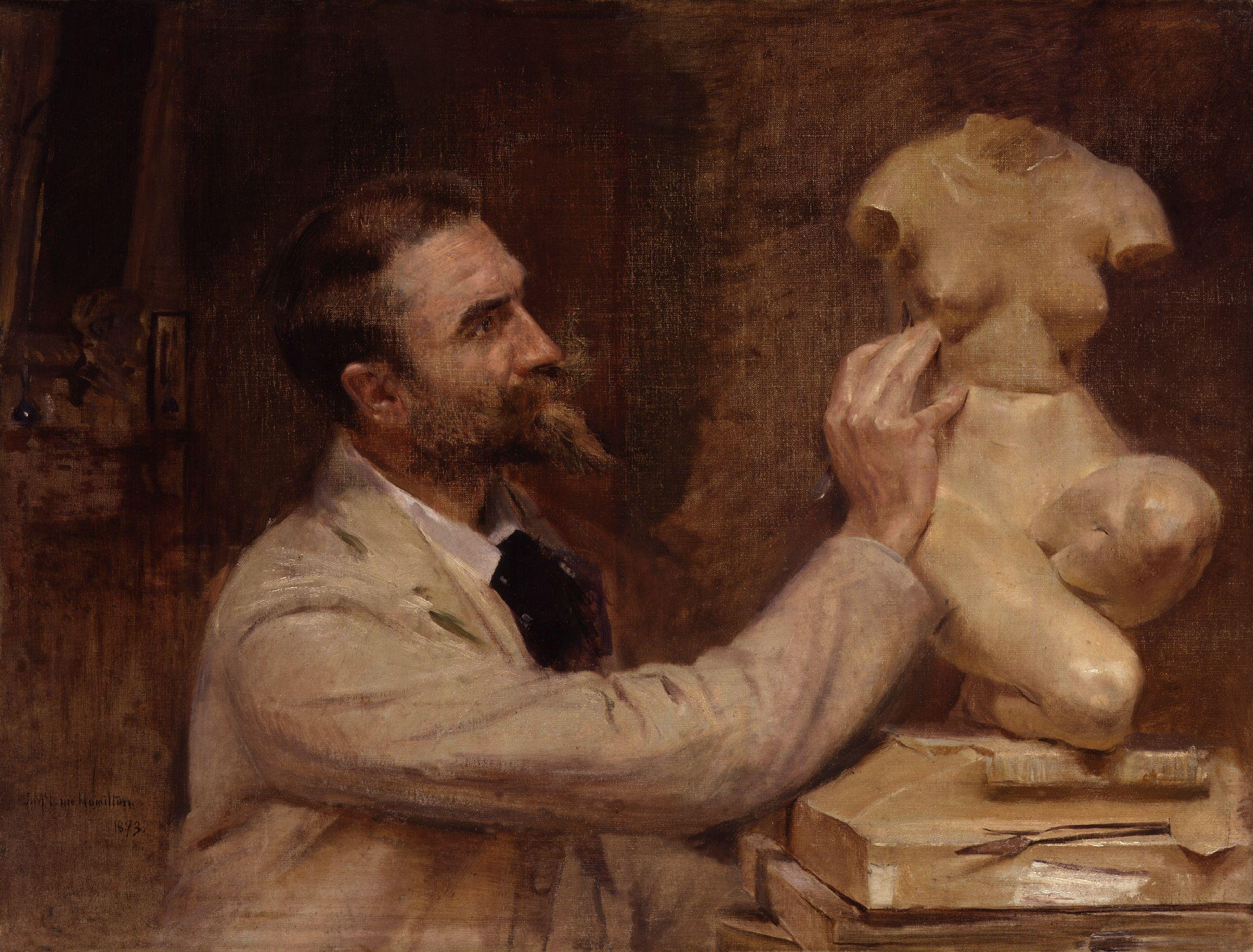
- Edward Onslow Ford by John McLure Hamilton, 1893. The work in progress is Applause, completed in bronze the same year.
- Born: 27 July 1852; London, England
- Died: 23 December 1901 (aged 49); London, England
- Known for: Sculpture
- Movement: New Sculpture
- Spouse: Anne Gwendoline von Kreuzer

Edward Onslow Ford RA (27 July 1852 – 23 December 1901) was an English sculptor. Much of Ford's early success came with portrait heads or busts. These were considered extremely refined, showing his subjects at their best and led to him receiving a number of commissions for public monuments and statues, both in Britain and overseas. Ford also produced a number of bronze statuettes of free-standing figures loosely drawn from mythology or of allegorical subjects. These 'ideal' figures became characteristic of the New Sculpture movement that developed in Britain from about 1880 and of which Ford was a leading exponent.

== Biography ==
=== Early life ===
Ford was born at Islington in north London, the son of businessman Edward Ford and Martha Lydia Gardner. His family moved to Blackheath while he was still a child. After he had spent some time at Blackheath Proprietary School, he went to Antwerp to study painting at Royal Academy of Fine Arts there during 1870 and 1871. Ford then studied under Michael Wagmüller in Munich until 1874, during which time he shared a studio with the sculptor Edwin Roscoe Mullins. Before leaving Munich, Ford married a fellow student Anne Gwendoline, the third daughter of Baron Frans von Kreusser, in 1873.

=== Portrait work ===
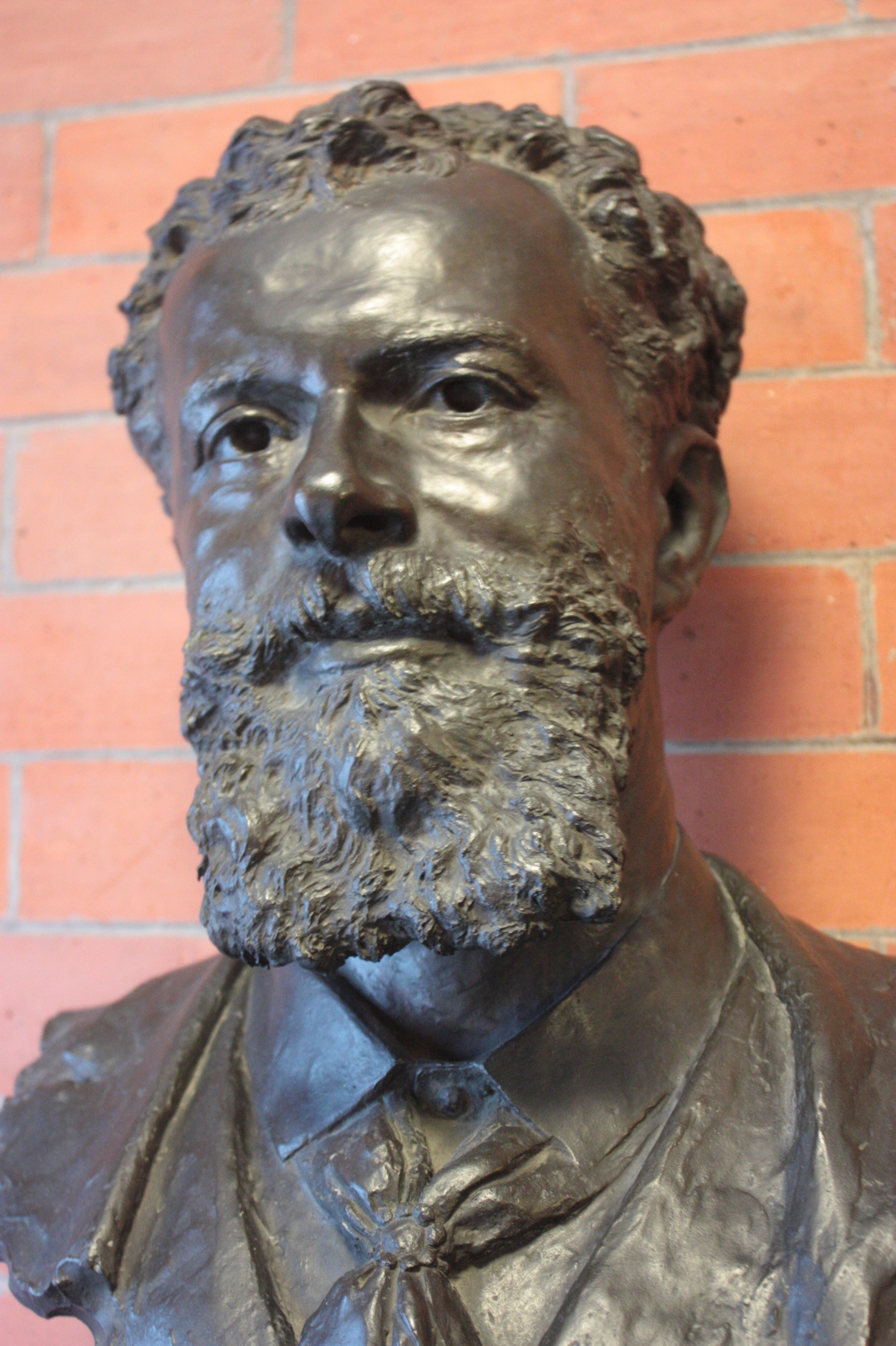
George Henschel by Edward Onslow Ford, 1895

On returning to England around 1874, Ford settled at Blackheath and established a studio concentrating on portrait sculptures. In 1875, he submitted a portrait bust he had sculpted of his wife to the Royal Academy Summer Exhibition in London. From 1875 to 1884 Ford exhibited portrait sculptures each year at the Academy.

Much of Ford's early success came in portraiture. His portrait busts are extremely refined and show his subjects at their best. He sculpted many portrait busts which are noted for their tasteful conception, delicate modelling, and verisimilitude. The best, perhaps, are the heads of John Everett Millais, Thomas Huxley, Herbert Spencer, Sir WQ Orchardson, Matthew Ridley Corbet, the duke of Norfolk, Briton Rivière, Sir Lawrence Alma-Tadema, Sir Walter Armstrong, Sir Hubert von Herkomer, Arthur Hacker (1894), and M. Dagnan-Bouveret. Those in bronze of his fellow-artist Arthur Hacker (1894) and of the politician Arthur Balfour are striking likenesses, as is the marble statue of Sir Frederick Bramwell for the Royal Institution.

In 1881 Ford moved his studio operation to Sydney Mews, among a block of studios off the Fulham Road. Alfred Gilbert had a neighbouring studio and together they worked on a number of experimental techniques, notably in lost wax casting which Ford would use throughout his career.

=== Exhibition pieces ===
In 1885 Ford exhibited a full-size bronze male nude, Linus at the Royal Academy and the following year exhibited Folly there, the first in an extended series of bronze statuettes of adolescent girls in poses loosely derived from mythology or allegorical themes. Folly was acquired by the Trusties of the Chantrey Fund for the Tate in 1886 and Ford's subsequent variations on the subject, including Peace (1887), The Singer (1889), Applause (1893) and Echo (1895) were also widely praised. These works, termed 'ideal figures', came to be regarded by art critics as among the defining works of the New Sculpture movement that had developed in Britain from about 1880 onwards as a reaction to the blandness of much other Victorian sculpture.

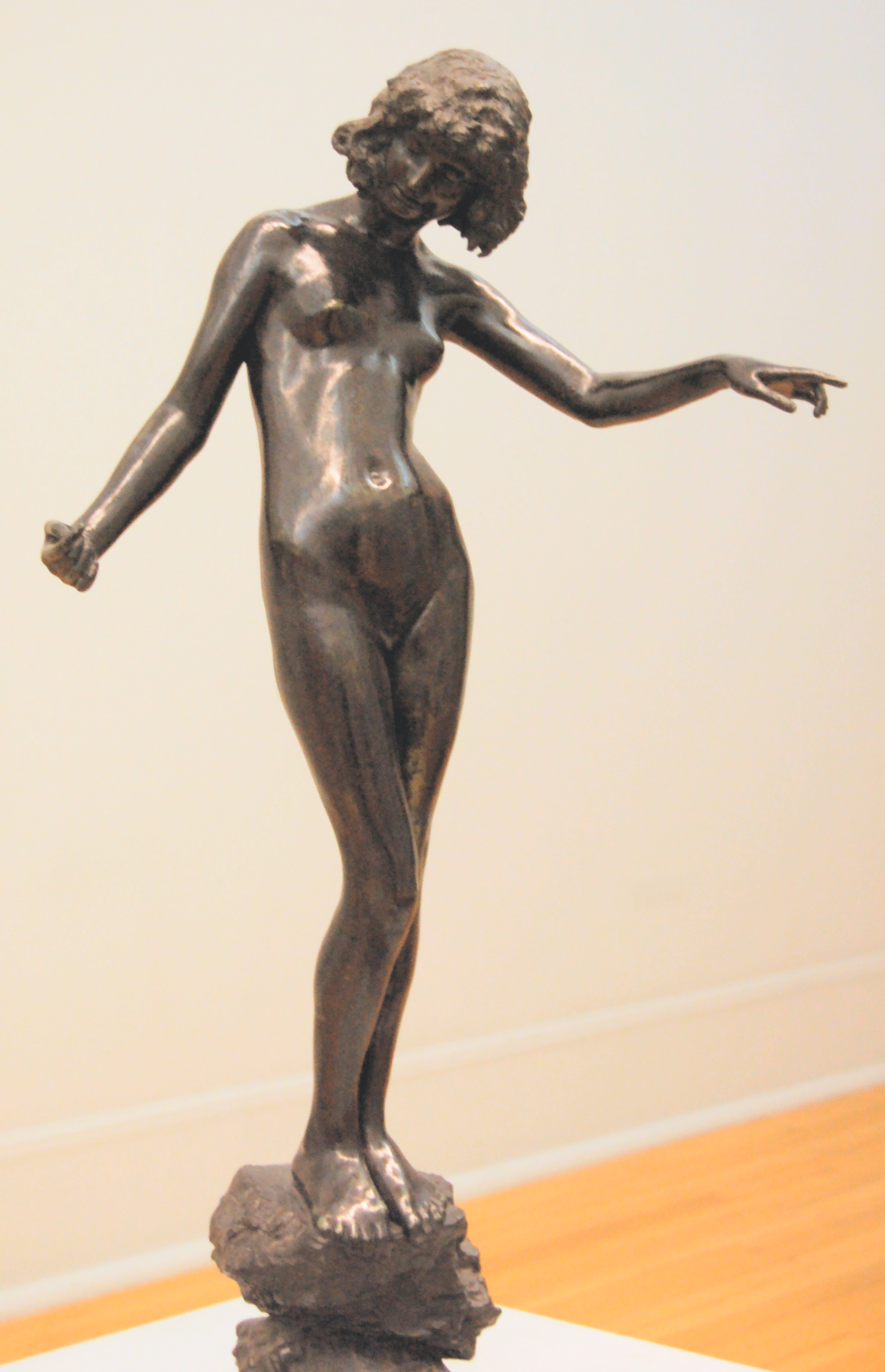
Folly, 1886

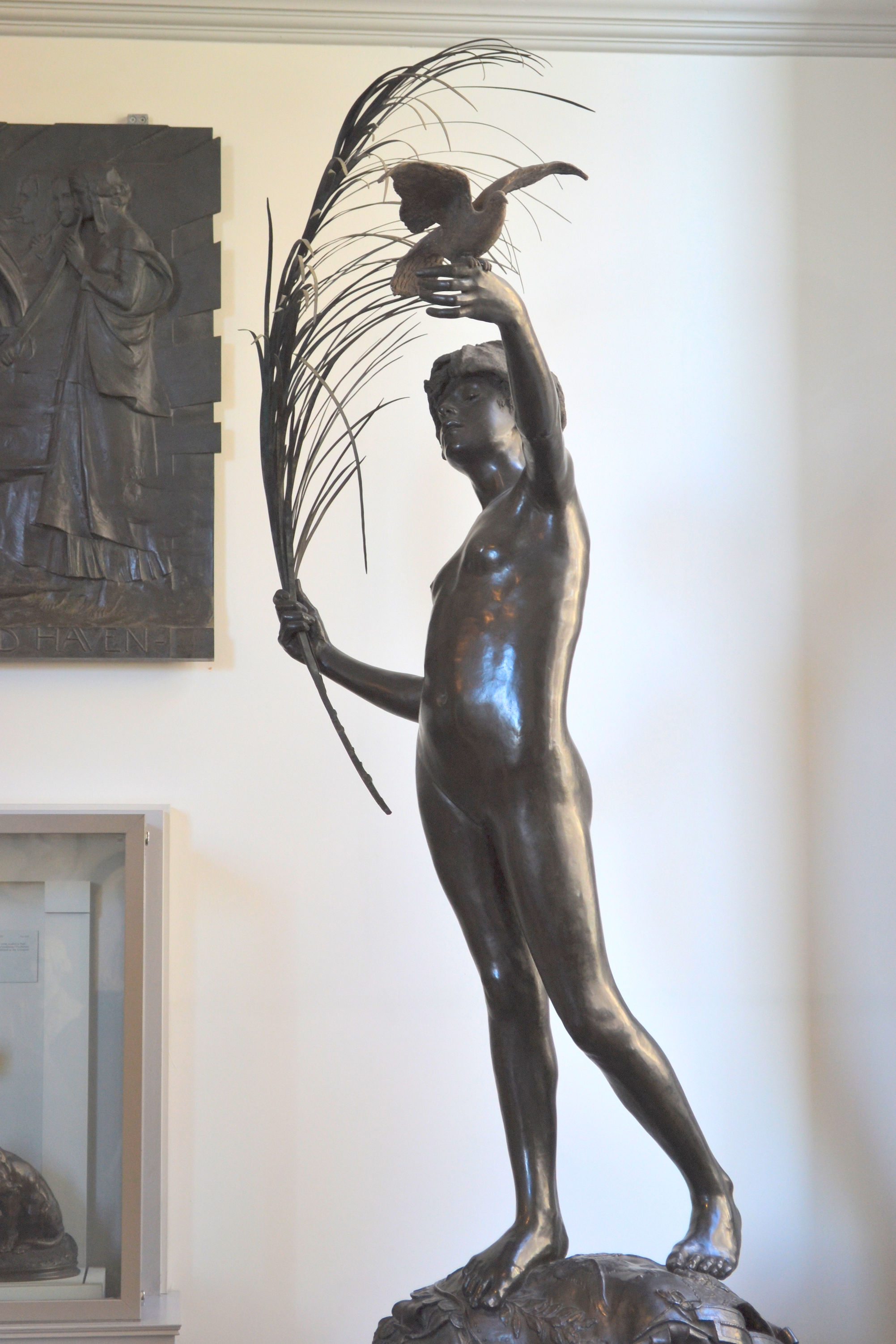
Peace, 1887

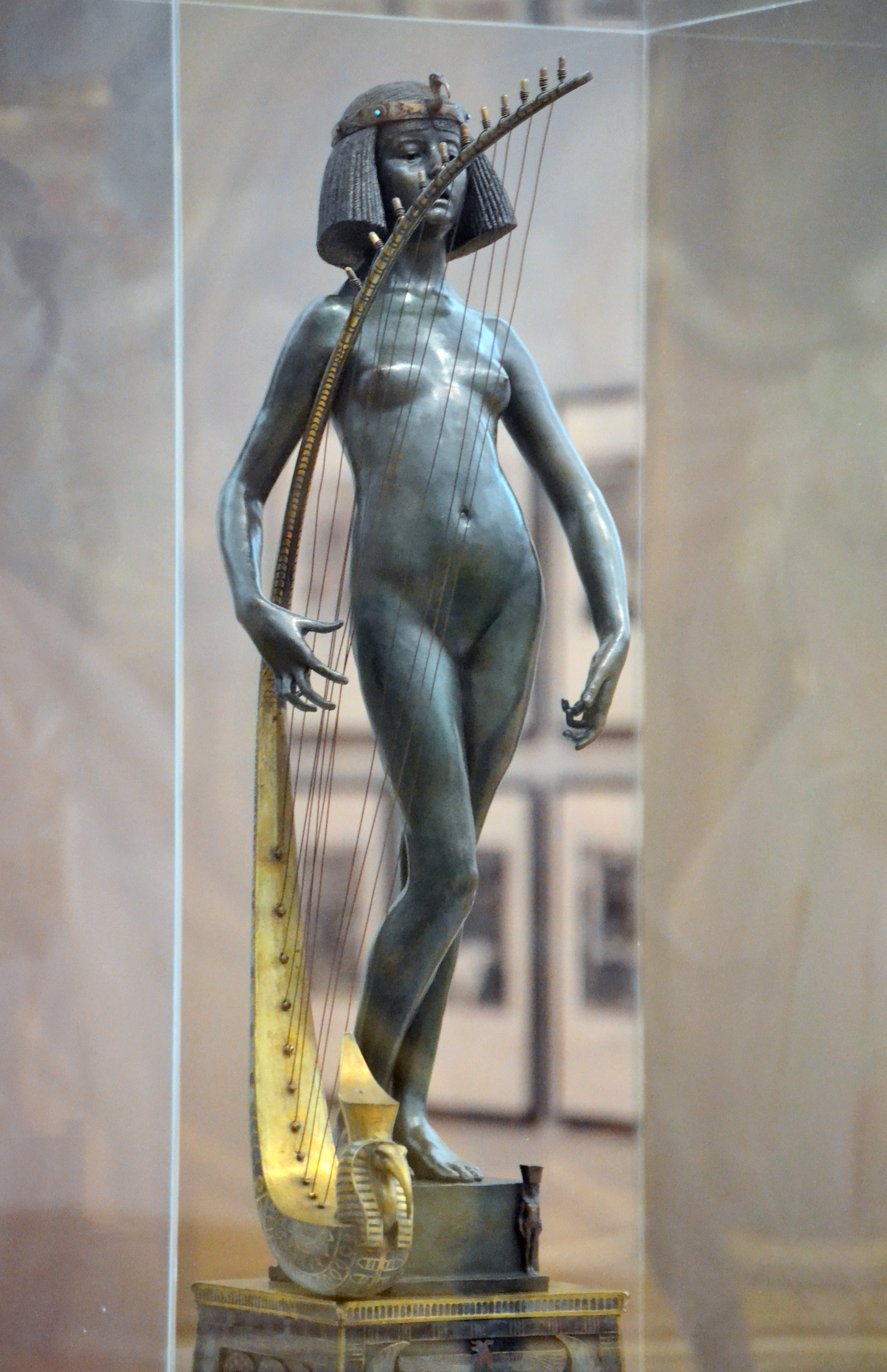
The Singer, or The Egyptian Singer, 1889

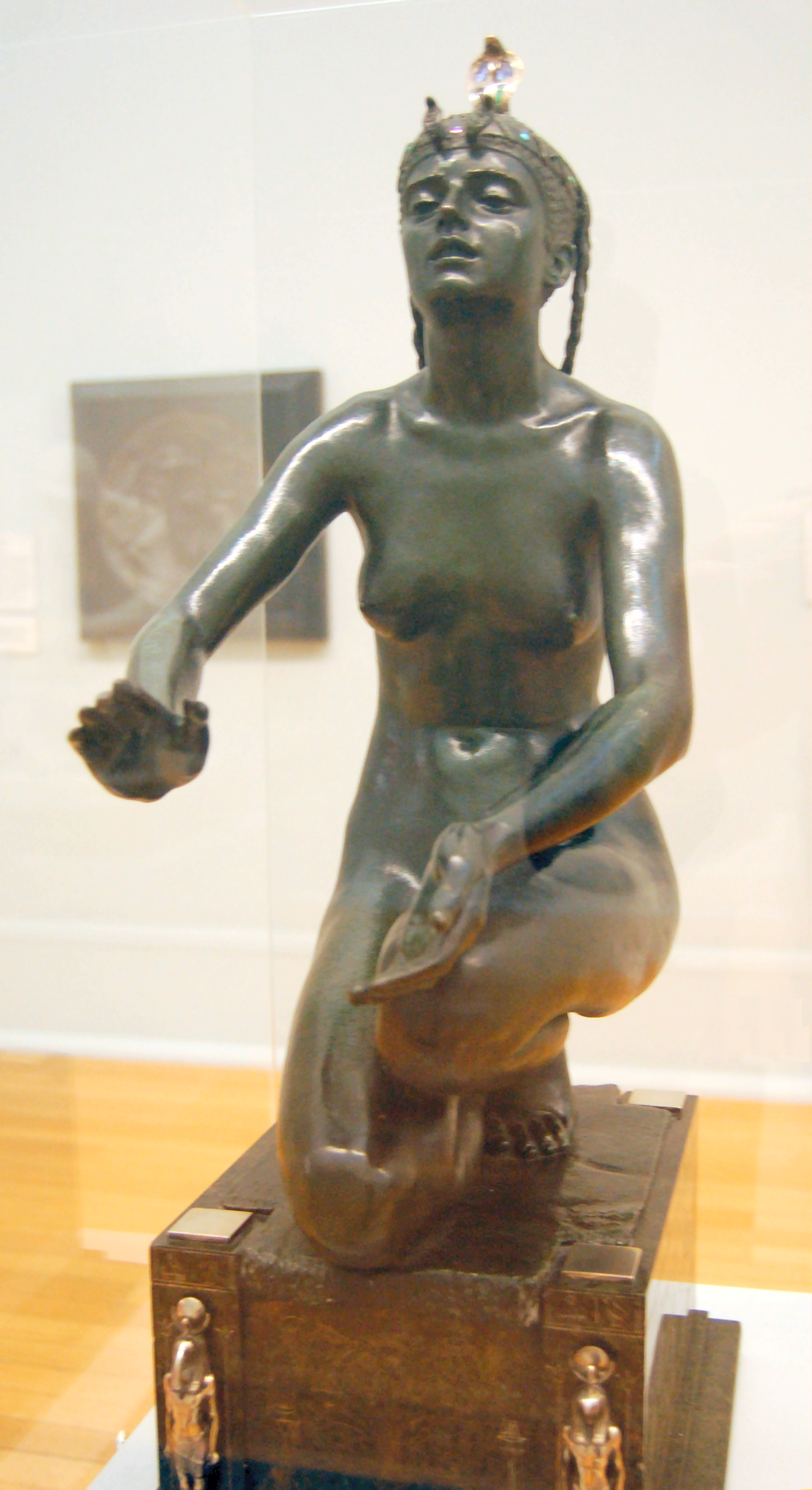
Applause, 1893

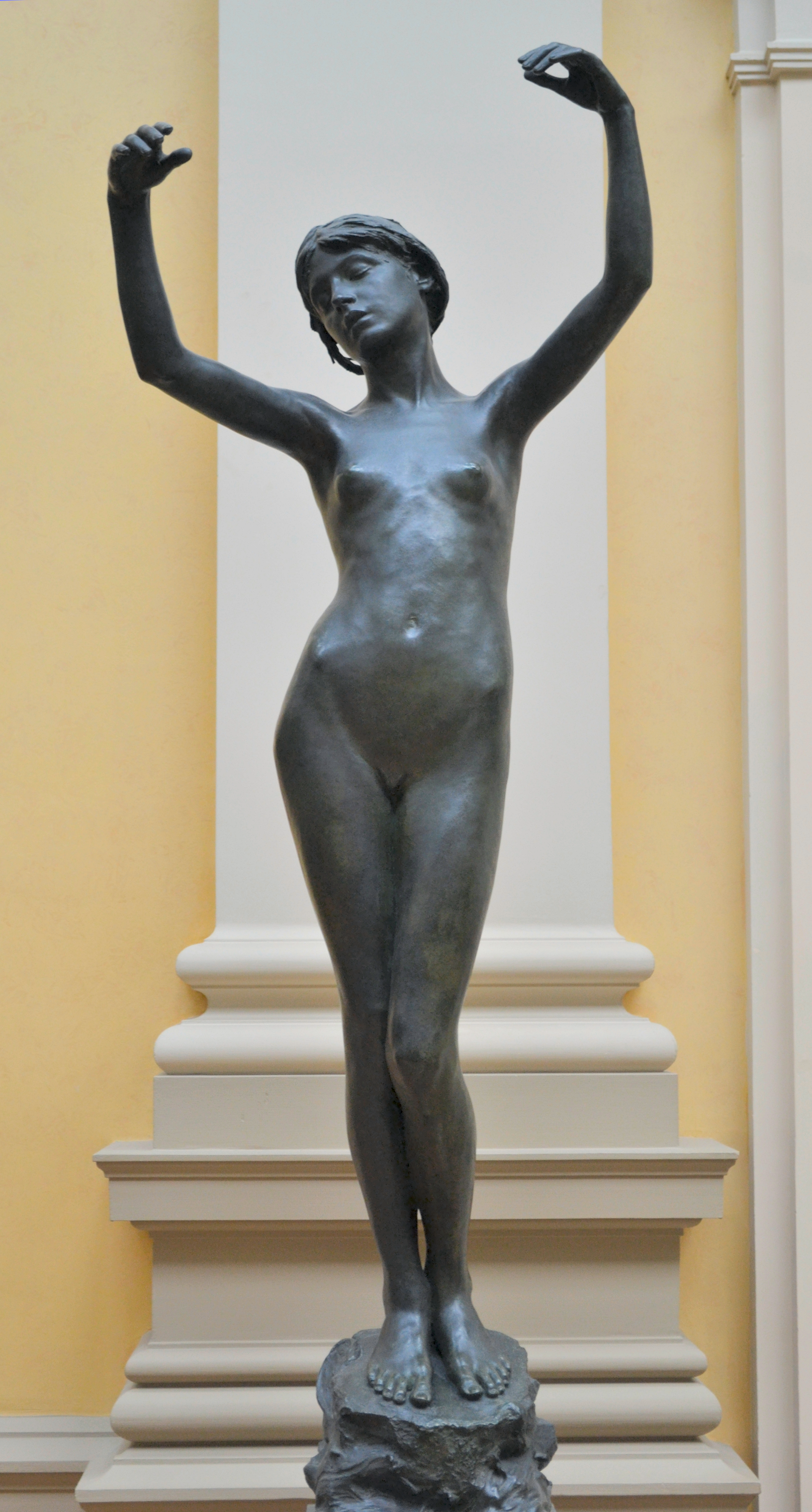
Echo, 1895

The modest scale of these works by Ford indicate they were not intended for grand country houses but rather for smaller domestic settings and, like other New Sculpture artists, Ford supported the commercial production of bronze statuettes and smaller copies of his work for the home market with Peace and other works by him becoming popular reproductions. Another characteristic of New Sculpture which Ford embraced was the use of polychromatic materials. For example, Applause has coloured resins with semi-precious stones and elements in silver, while The Singer uses copper and brass strips.

The Singer and 'Applause were both originally on lotus-shaped pedestals (now presumed lost), share the use of Egyptian motifs and iconography and are related by subject matter. Although created four years apart, Ford clearly considered the two works a pair and they each appear in several portraits of him, indicating both their significance to him personally and their place as his most widely exhibited works. The two were only exhibited together once, at the Paris International Exhibition of 1900, during Ford's lifetime. Since 2008 both have been in the Tate collection in London, although not always on display.

=== Public monuments ===
Alongside his portrait work, Ford received his first public commission in 1881 for the statue of Rowland Hill now at King Edward Street in London. Other notable commissions included Irving as Hamlet (1883) depicting Henry Irving, found in the Guildhall Art Gallery and the Shelley Memorial in University College, Oxford (1892). The standing statue of William Ewart Gladstone, 1894, for the City Liberal Club, London, is regarded as one of Ford's best portrait works.

A number of Ford's monumental commissions celebrate the British Empire, either by promoting imperial values or as memorials to military figures. A memorial statue by Ford from 1890, depicting General Gordon on a camel, stands at Brompton Barracks, Chatham, the home of the Royal School of Military Engineering. A second cast of the statue was installed in Khartoum from 1904 until 1958 when, shortly after Sudan achieved its independence, the statue was removed and relocated to Gordon's School at Woking in Surrey during 1959. Ford oversaw the production of small copies in bronze of the complete Gordon figure and of the camel alone for the domestic retail market. The full-size statue was exhibited in the Egyptian Hall of The Crystal Palace in south London for a time and a statuette of the camel was shown at the Arts and Crafts Exhibition Society in 1889. Ford's 1895 equestrian statue of the army officer Lord Strathnairn, originally erected at Knightsbridge, was cast in gun-metal presented by the Indian government. He created a silver equestrian statuette, commissioned by the family, of Frederick Roberts, who was killed in action at the Battle of Colenso in the Second Boer War.

Ford received several commissions for monuments in India. These included the 1898 statue of the Maharaja of Mysore, Chamarajendra Wadiyar X in full state regalia, installed in the Lal Bagh botanical garden in Bangalore, the 1899 seated statue of Maharaja Lakshmeshwar Singh Bahadur of Darbhanga in Kolkata and two full-size statues representing Dance and Music which were commissioned by the Maharajah of Durbhanga, Lachmeswar Singh Bahadur.

Completed sometime during 1890, Ford's memorial to Percy Bysshe Shelley was commissioned by Lady Shelley, the widow of the poets' son, Sir Percy Shelley, 3rd Baronet, for the Protestant Cemetery in Rome but was deemed too large for the intended location and eventually installed at University College, Oxford. With the intended cemetery location in mind, Ford designed the monument with a tall and elaborate base in bronze and coloured marble featuring a mourning figure and winged lions supporting a marble figure of the drowned Shelley. The work was shown at the Royal Academy in 1891, to considerable praise, before being installed at Oxford.

For Queen Victoria's Diamond Jubilee in 1897, Ford was commissioned to create a monumental statue of the Queen for Manchester. The work was not completed until after her death and received poor reviews when exhibited, indoors, at the Royal Academy in May 1901 but was greatly praised when unveiled in a more appropriate external setting in Manchester later the same year. Victoria sat for Ford a number of times for the Manchester monument. At her request, those studies became the basis of several portrait busts of the queen by Ford, in both marble and bronze, which she used as gifts. Ford delivered the last of these early in January 1901, weeks before she died. He subsequently produced a number of small-scale copies, in bronze, of the work which is considered a sensitive and sympathetic study of the elderly Victoria and the last sculptured likeness of her for which she sat.

Ford was a founding member of the Art Workers Guild in 1884 and became president of the Guild in 1885. He was elected an Associate Member of the Royal Academy in 1888 and became a full Academician in 1895.

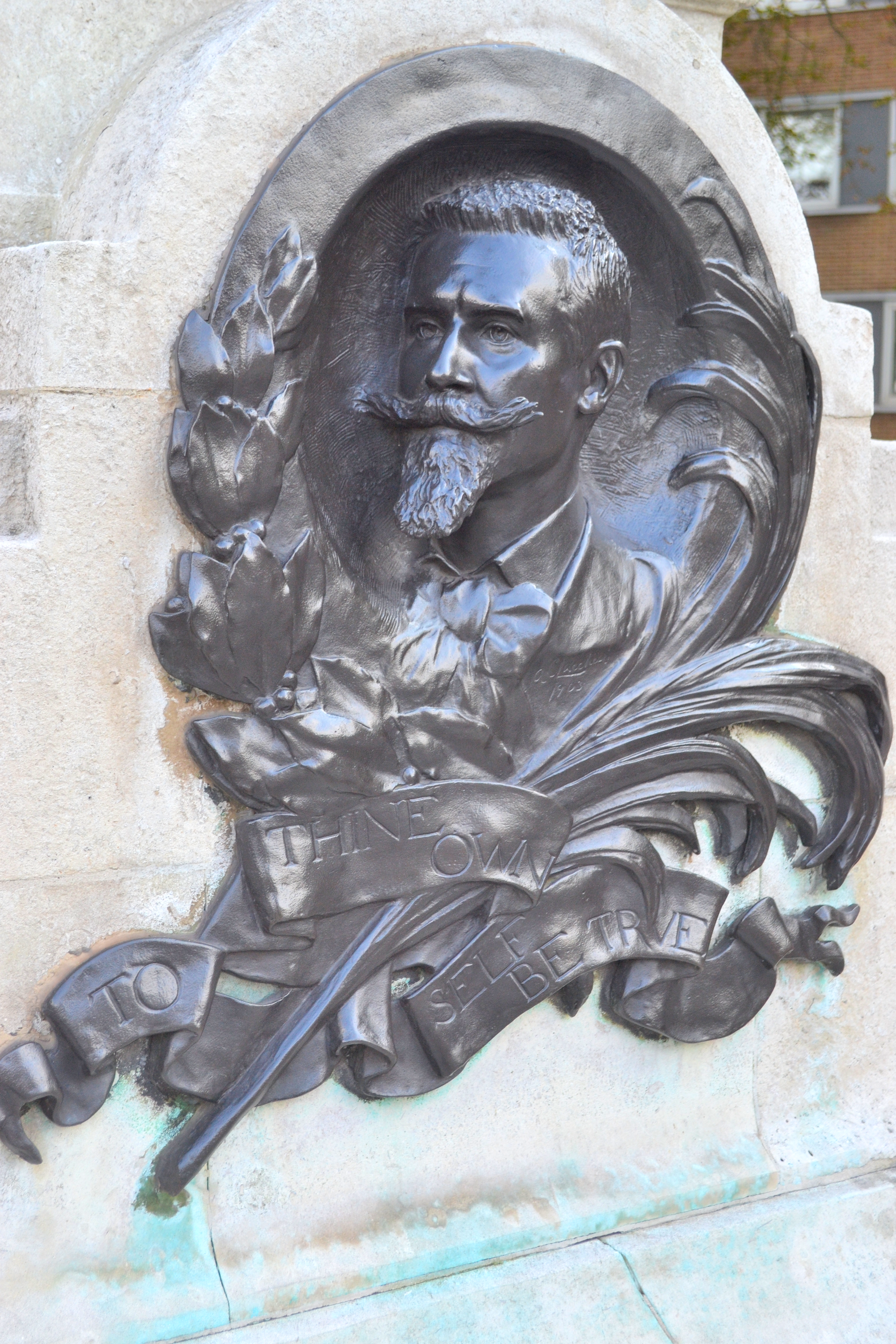
Detail of the Edward Onslow Ford Memorial, London, relief by Andrea Carlo Lucchesi

=== Death and legacy ===
Around 1900, following an extended period of over-work and stress from financial worries, Ford developed heart disease but continued working at pace and died suddenly at his home in St John's Wood on 23 December 1901. Ford's obituary in The Sketch, dated 1 January 1902, states that he died of pneumonia exacerbated by a weak heart. However the suddenness of his death, and his debt issues, led to some speculation about suicide. He was survived by his mother, his wife, four sons, and a daughter. Two of his sons had worked with Ford in his studio and they completed some of his unfinished works, most notably the marble sculpture, Snowdrift. His salt cellar, in silver, ivory, marble and lapis lazuli, of St George and the Dragon was completed by John Seymour Lucas.

A monument was erected to Ford's memory which was designed by the architect J W Simpson and sculpted by Ford's former studio assistant Andrea Carlo Lucchesi in St John's Wood, near his home. The monument comprises a stone pillar with a bronze seated figure in mourning at the front, based on Ford's statue The Muse of Poetry, and a wreathed bust of Ford at rear.

The Henry Moore Foundation in Leeds holds an archive of Ford's papers and correspondence. The Fine Art Society held a memorial exhibition for Ford in 1905, from which the Victoria and Albert Museum in London purchased a, unfinished, bronze titled Fate. Several other national collections in Britain hold examples of Ford's work, notably the Tate, the National Portrait Gallery in London, the Lady Lever Art Gallery on Merseyside and the Walker Art Gallery in Liverpool.

== Selected public works ==
Image	Title / subject	Location and coordinates	Date	Type	Material	Dimensions	Designation	Wikidata	Notes
	8 artists	Former Royal Society of Painters in Watercolours building, 190–195 Piccadilly, London	1881-1883	8 busts in roundels	Stone		Grade II		
More images	Rowland Hill	King Edward Street, London	1881	Statue on pedestal	Bronze and granite		Grade II	Q23016273	
More images	William Adams	National Museum Cardiff	1887	Bust	Marble	73.5cm			
	General Charles George Gordon	Brompton Barracks, Chatham	1890	Statue of rider and camel on pedestal	Bronze and stone		Grade II*		
More images	Memorial to Christopher Marlowe	Marlowe Theatre, The Friars, Canterbury	1891	Statue on pedestal with 4 statuettes	Bronze and stone		Grade II	Q19354026	
More images	Memorial to Percy Bysshe Shelley	University College, Oxford	1892	Statue on podium with supporting figures	Marble and bronze			Q4793800	
	Freshfield family grave	Brookwood Cemetery, Surrey	1892	Aedicula and grave cover	Marble and bronze		Grade II		
	Sir William Pearce, 1st Baronet	Govan Road, Glasgow	1894	Statue on pedestal	Bronze on granite		Grade B	Q17812525	
More images	Hugh Rose, 1st Baron Strathnairn	Foley Manor, Liphook, Hampshire	1895	Equestrian statue on pedestal with panels	Bronze and Portland stone				Erected 1895 in London, removed 1931, sold and relocated to Liphook in 1964.
More images	Hamilton Macallum	Sea Hill, Beer, Devon	c. 1896	Plaque with seating surround	Bronze and stone				Second plaque and barometer to rear
	Ralph Ward Jackson	Church Street, Hartlepool	1897	Statue on pedestal with plaques	Bronze and limestone		Grade II	Q26542291	
More images	Maharaja Lakshmeshwar Singh	B.B.D. Bagh, Kolkata	1898	Seated statue on pedestal	Marble		Grade I	Q68455460	
More images	Thomas Henry Huxley	Natural History Museum, London	1900	Seated statue	Marble				
	Henry Fitzalan-Howard, 15th Duke of Norfolk	Sheffield Town Hall	1900	Seated statue on pedestal	Marble		Grade I		Architect, Edward William Mountford
More images	Lady Mary & Sir Andrew Clarke Monument	Locksbrook Cemetery, Bath	1900	Sarcophagus and base	Bronze and stone		Grade II		
More images	Queen Victoria	Piccadilly Gardens, Manchester	1901	Seated statue on pedestal	Bronze and Portland stone		Grade II	Q26539302	
	John Ruskin	Poets' Corner, Westminster Abbey	1901	Portrait roundel	Bronze				
	Adam Sedgwick	Sedgwick Museum of Earth Sciences, Cambridge	1901	Statue					
	Memorial to George Grey	Crypt of St. Paul's Cathedral, London	c. 1901	Bust with plaque & panel	White, red & yellow marble				
	General Charles George Gordon	Gordon's School, Woking	1902	Statue of rider and camel on pedestal	Bronze and stone		Grade II		Cast 1902 & erected in Khartoum, relocated to England in 1959 with a new plinth

=== Other works ===
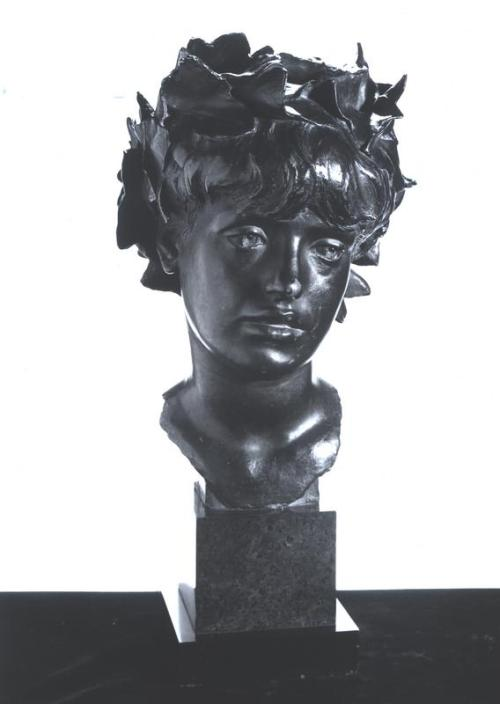
A Bacchante

- Processional cross for Saint Matthew's Church, Sheffield
- The Resurrection of Christ, c. 1889–1893, Saint Albans Cathedral
- Monument to Benjamin Jowett, 1897, Balliol College, Oxford
- Marble pulpit with bronze panels, c. 1888, St Mary-le-More, Wallingford
- Statue on pedestal of Chamarajendra Wadiyar X, the Maharaja of Mysore, 1898, Lal Bagh, Bangalore
- Bronze statue on pedestal of James Davidson Gordon, c. 1884, Gordon Park, Mysore
- A Bacchante bronze on a black stone base,1899, in Aberdeen Archives Art Gallery and Museum collection
