= Sophia Stacey =

British businessman (1791–1874)

- Born: c. 1791; Maidstone, Kent
- Died: 11 December 1874; London, England

Sophia Stacey (c. 1791– 11 December 1874) was a friend of the Romantic poet Percy Bysshe Shelley. Shelley dedicated the Ode to Sophia which begins:

Thou art fair, and few are fairer,
Of the nymphs of earth or ocean,
They are robes that fit the wearer -
Those soft limbs of thine whose motion,
Ever falls and shifts and glances
As the life within them dances''.

== Early life ==
Stacey was born in Maidstone, the county town of Kent, to Flint William Stacey, a prosperous local businessman and sometime mayor. Stacey lost both her parents quite young and spent three years of her youth living with a Mr and Mrs Charles Parker. Mrs Parker was Shelley's aunt but there is no record Sophia had ever met him before this time. Apparently an attractive and musical girl with some fortune, she did not marry young. All portraits of her show very strong eyes. She was also slightly older than the poet; many writers have assumed she was quite young.

== Grand tour ==
In 1819 she set out on a grand tour of Europe with an older companion, Corbet Parry-Jones (to be described by Mary Shelley as the 'little old Welshwoman'). In November they reached Florence where the Shelleys were living. They called on him at his pensione on the Via Valfonde. Striking a rapport, the two women moved into the same pensione. Mary Shelley was heavily pregnant and soon after their arrival gave birth to a son. Sophia is credited with suggesting he be named after his natal city: Percy Florence Shelley. (The following year an English girl born in the same city was also named after it and so, from Florence Nightingale, it became an established English girl's name.) Over about two months the poet showed Sophia around the city while she would play the harp and sing his verses. There is no evidence of the relationship becoming more than platonic. He wrote and gave her the Ode.

Shortly after Christmas, Sophia and Corbet left Florence. At the parting Shelley gave Sophia a notebook with a number of verses inside. They went to Rome where Sophia received a lengthy letter from Mary with the Ode to a Faded Violet inscribed on the back by Shelley. They never met again; he drowned two years later.

== Later life ==
She eventually married in 1823 a somewhat younger army officer, Captain James Patrick Catty of the Royal Engineers, who was the son of Louis Francois Catty, who was either a refugee from the French Revolution or a French Canadian, sources differ. He anglicised his name to Lewis Frances and taught French for many years during the Napoleonic Wars at the Woolwich military academy. The wedding was a significant affair and was followed by a reception given by Maria Fitzherbert, George IV's morganatic wife.

They had three children who lived to adulthood, a daughter and two sons. The daughter married a Royal Marine officer. The younger son, Corbet, spent a spell in the household of the Lord Mayor of London and then retired to the family home, Hill Green House, in the village of Stockbury near Maidstone. The elder, Charles, followed his father into the army where he was very active in the Zulu wars in South Africa and rose to the rank of Major-General. He did not marry until he was 49; his bride was a descendant of the Scottish Anstruther clan.

James left the army in 1833, probably because of ill health, and died six years later. Sophia married again the following year Frederick George Hamond (spelt thus. Some sources give it incorrectly as Hammond or Hermond) whose own wife had recently died. There was probably an element of convenience for both in this as being single was not very easy at this time. Apparently she was still often known as Mrs Catty. A family note says she was always a devoted mother and her children 'adored' her.

She died in London in 1874 and was taken to Stockbury for burial. An obituary in the Kentish Times makes much of her friendship with Shelley, suggesting it was an important event in her life.

== Surviving items ==
A considerable number of items connected with Sophia and her family survive:

- Sophia's birth is recorded in Maidstone Parish Church.
- The letter written by Mary Shelley is in the Bodmer Library in Switzerland.
- The British Museum has a copy of her father's French textbook for Woolwich.
- The Maidstone Museum holds a reference collection of mineral rocks collected by her son Corbet and a portrait bust.
- The Bodleian Library in Oxford has some letters Sophia exchanged with Sir Percy Shelley in later years.
- There is a memorial to Sophia in Stockbury Parish Church.
- Her husband's army coatee is in the National Army Museum in Chelsea, where it is the oldest item of Engineer's uniform in the collection.
- Hill Green house was burnt down in 1922 but has been replaced. The family also owned the Gibraltar Inn on Maidstone Canal, which is now a private house.
- Her descendants still hold a commonplace book she kept in 1812, a miniature from circa 1818 by Bouton, a photograph of a later portrait after she was married by Grimaldi, a daguerreotype photograph taken later in life and a scrapbook which contains a lock of her hair. However they have nothing directly linking her with Shelley.
- There is a plaque recording the poet's stay on the building on the site of the pensione in the Via Valfonde in Florence, which now runs alongside the train station. The original building was a victim of World War II.

Items not now traced include

- The original copy of the Ode. This is recorded as coming up for sale at Sothebys in 1938 along with the letter from Mary above but it is not clear who bought it or whether it failed to sell.
- A journal kept by Sophia during her travels. However the early 20th century writer Helen Rosetti Angeli used it for her Shelley and his Friends in Italy and quotes extensively. It appears to have been a somewhat mundane account.
- The notebook given by Shelley to Sophia on her departure. A family note says it was given to the Bodleian around 1900 but the library now has no knowledge of this.

The fullest account of Shelley and Sophia's friendship is given in James Bieri's 2005 biography of the poet which also reproduces the Bouton portrait.
