= Scarlet Knight =

Scarlet Knight may refer to:

- Rutgers Scarlet Knights, the Rutgers University athletic teams
- RU-27, an experimental robot submersible named after the teams
- "Scarlet Knight" (song), the 23rd single by Japanese singer and voice actress Nana Mizuki
