= Scarlet =

Scarlet may refer to:

- Scarlet (cloth), a type of woollen cloth common in medieval England
- Scarlet (color), a bright tone of red that is slightly toward orange, named after the cloth
- Scarlet (dye), the dye used to give the cloth its color
- Scarlet (orca), a southern resident killer whale

== Companies and brands ==
- Scarlet (company), a Belgian telecommunications company
- The Scarlet, a compact, 3K-resolution digital cinema camera from Red Digital Cinema Camera Company

== Fictional characters ==
- Scarlet, a black horse with red highlights from the Horseland television series
- Skarlet (Mortal Kombat), a character in the Mortal Kombat series
- Scarlet Benoît, a character in The Lunar Chronicles book series
- Scarlet Briar, a character in the massively multiplayer online role-playing game Guild Wars 2
- Captain Scarlet (character), a main character of British children's puppet animation of the same name
- Cure Scarlet, a character in the anime series Go! Princess PreCure
- Erza Scarlet, a character from Fairy Tail
- Miss Scarlet, one of six original Clue characters (US spelling)
- Scarlet O'Donnell, a character in the 2009 American fantasy comedy movie 17 Again
- Scarlet Overkill, a character in the film Minions
- Princess Scarlet, a main character of the 2025 Japanese animated fantasy action film Scarlet
- Queen Scarlet of the SkyWings, a major antagonist from the Wings of Fire book series
- Remilia Scarlet and Flandre Scarlet, sister characters in Embodiment of Scarlet Devil from the Touhou Project
- Will Scarlet, one of Robin Hood's Merry Men

== Music ==
- Scarlet (American band), American metalcore band
- Scarlet (British band), UK vocal duo
- Scarlet (Swedish band), Swedish heavy metal duo
- The Scarlets, American R&B vocal group

=== Albums ===
- Scarlet (Closterkeller album), 1995
- Scarlet (Code Red album), 1997
- Scarlet (Doja Cat album), 2023

=== Songs ===
- "Scarlet", a song by Ray Conniff 1963
- "Scarlet" (song), a song by the Rolling Stones 1974
- "Scarlet", a song by U2 from the album October, 1981
- "Scarlet", a song by All About Eve 1990
- "Scarlet", a song by Dawnstar 2007
- "Scarlet", a song by F.T. Island 2022
- "Scarlet", a song by In This Moment from the album Blood, 2012
- "Scarlet", a song by Jars of Clay from the album The Eleventh Hour, 2002
- "Scarlet", a song by Periphery from the album Periphery II: This Time It's Personal, 2012

== People ==
- Scarlet Moon de Chevalier (1950–2013), Brazilian actress, journalist and writer
- Scarlet Page (born 1971), English photographer and the daughter of Led Zeppelin guitarist Jimmy Page and Charlotte Martin
- Scarlet the Southern Belle, a member of the Southern Belles tag-team from the Gorgeous Ladies of Wrestling

== Print ==
- Scarlet (magazine), a British women's magazine
- Scarlet (Icon Comics), a creator-owned comicbook series by Brian Michael Bendis
- Scarlet (novel), a 2013 novel by Marissa Meyer

== Other uses ==
- Scarlet (2022 film), a 2022 drama film directed by Pietro Marcello
- Scarlet (2025 film), a 2025 animated film directed by Mamoru Hosoda
- Captain Scarlet and the Mysterons, a 1960s British children's puppet animation series
- Scarlet (TV series), a 2019–20 Japanese drama
- Pokémon Scarlet, one of the two paired Pokémon Scarlet and Violet games for the Nintendo Switch
- Scarlets (formerly the Llanelli Scarlets), a Welsh rugby union team
- Scarlet fever, an infectious disease most commonly affecting children
- The Scarlet Hotels, a hotel chain that includes The Scarlet Singapore

== See also ==
- Scarlett (disambiguation)
- Scarlet Knight (disambiguation)
