= James Scarlett, 8th Baron Abinger =

British peer

Lieutenant Colonel The Right Honourable The Lord Abinger KStJ DL

Member of the House of Lords
- Lord Temporal
- In office 21 July 1943 – 11 November 1999 as a hereditary peer
- Preceded by: The 7th Baron Abinger
- Succeeded by: Seat abolished (Note: Pursuant to the House of Lords Act 1999.)

Personal details
- Born: James Richard Scarlett; 28 September 1914
- Died: 23 September 2002 (aged 87)
- Children: James Scarlett, 9th Baron Abinger; Hon. Peter Scarlett
- Parents: Hugh Scarlett, 7th Baron Abinger; Marjorie McPhillamy
- Occupation: Farmer, politician

Military service
- Allegiance: British Army
- Branch/service: Royal Artillery
- Years of service: 1936–1947
- Rank: Lieutenant Colonel

Lieutenant Colonel James Richard Scarlett, 8th Baron Abinger (28 September 1914 – 23 September 2002), was a British peer.

== Life ==
Scarlett was born in Datchet, Berkshire, on 28 September 1914, the son of Hugh Scarlett, 7th Baron Abinger, and his wife Marjorie (née McPhillamy). He was educated at Eton and Magdalene College, Cambridge, where he read for a BA in economics. Having been commissioned into the Royal Artillery in 1936, he saw service in France, Norway and India, eventually rising to become a lieutenant colonel by the time of his retirement in 1947. After the war, he returned to Magdalene, where he received an MA in 1946. In 1968, he was appointed Deputy Lieutenant for Essex.

After the death of his father in 1943, he inherited the baronial title along with Inverlochy Castle near Fort William in Scotland. He sold Inverlochy after World War II to a Canadian whiskey merchant, and bought Clees Hall, a mixed farm near Alphamstone on the Essex/Suffolk border.

Scarlett was passionate about the regulation of 'amateur archaeologists' using metal detectors, and worked from 1979 to 1981 towards legislation to regulate the reporting of finds. His interest in the conservation of the rural environment led to his appointment as chairman for the Essex branch of the Council for the Preservation of Rural England, which he held from 1972 to 1982. In 1974, Scarlett co-founded the Colne Stour Countryside Association.

Scarlett was also chairman of the Keats-Shelley Memorial Association, his grandmother having been adopted by Sir Percy Shelley, 3rd Baronet, the son of Mary and Percy Bysshe Shelley. The Boscombe Collection of Shelley's letters and manuscripts, which Scarlett worked on cataloguing, are now held at the Bodleian Library in Oxford. He was also the vice-president of the Byron Society, and a Knight of the Order of St. John of Jerusalem.

Scarlett died on 23 September 2002, aged 87.

== Marriage ==
In 1957, Lord Abinger married Isla Carolyn Rivett-Carnac (1925–2011), sister of the 8th and 9th Rivett-Carnac baronets. They had two sons:

- James Harry Scarlett (born 1959), who succeeded his father in the barony.
- Hon. Peter Richard Scarlett (1961–2020)

== Notes ==
Peerage of the United Kingdom
Preceded by Hugh Scarlett	Baron Abinger; 1943–2002; Member of the House of Lords (1943–1999)	Succeeded by James Scarlett
