= Hugh Scarlett, 7th Baron Abinger =

British Army officer (1878-1943)

The Right Honourable The Lord Abinger DSO DL
- Baron Abinger in 1931

Member of the House of Lords
- Lord Temporal
- In office 10 June 1927 – 21 July 1943
- Preceded by: The 6th Baron Abinger
- Succeeded by: The 8th Baron Abinger

Personal details
- Born: Hugh Richard Scarlett; 25 November 1878
- Died: 21 July 1943 (aged 64)
- Military career
- Allegiance: United Kingdom
- Branch: British Army
- Rank: Lieutenant Colonel
- Commands: 59th (Home Counties) (Cinque Ports) Brigade, Royal Field Artillery
- Conflicts: Second Boer War; First World War
- Awards: Companion of the Distinguished Service Order; Mentioned in Despatches (3)

Lieutenant Colonel Hugh Richard Scarlett, 7th Baron Abinger (25 November 1878 – 21 July 1943), was a British Army officer and peer.

== Family ==
Scarlett was the fourth son of Lieutenant Colonel Leopold James Yorke Campbell Scarlett, himself son of Peter Campbell Scarlett, third son of James Scarlett, 1st Baron Abinger. His mother, Bessie Florence Gibson, was the daughter of Edward Gibson, but had been adopted by Sir Percy Shelley, 3rd Baronet, and his wife Jane. On the death of his kinsman, the 4th Baron Abinger, in December 1903, Scarlett's eldest brother Shelley succeeded as the 5th Baron Abinger. The following year, Hugh (along with his siblings Robert, Ruth, Percy, and Leopold) were allowed to use the style The Honourable by a royal warrant of precedence. On his eldest brother's death without male heirs in 1917, the next brother, Robert, succeeded as the 6th Baron. He too, died without male heirs, and Hugh succeeded to the barony in 1927.

Scarlett married Marjorie Ursula MacPhillamy in 1913; they had three sons, James Richard Scarlett (who succeeded in the barony upon his father's death), John Leopold Campbell Scarlett, and Felix Hugh Lawrence Scarlett.

== Military career ==
Scarlett was commissioned as a second lieutenant in the Royal Artillery on 26 May 1900. He served with the Imperial Yeomanry in the Second Boer War in South Africa, seeing action in the Orange Free State and Orange River Colony in 1900. He then was stationed in Cape Colony, before he returned to England in August 1902. Promotion to the rank of lieutenant came while in South Africa, on 25 March 1902. He served in the First World War from 1914 to 1918 and was appointed a Companion of the Distinguished Service Order (DSO) in 1916. He retired as a lieutenant colonel, and in the 1920s was commanding officer of the 59th (Home Counties) (Cinque Ports) Brigade, Royal Field Artillery, of the Territorial Army. Scarlett was made a Deputy Lieutenant of the County of Inverness in 1930.

Peerage of the United Kingdom
Preceded by Robert Scarlett	Baron Abinger; 1927–1943; Member of the House of Lords (1927–1943)	Succeeded by James Scarlett
