= Sir Percy Shelley, 3rd Baronet =

British Baronet (1819–1889)

Sir Percy Shelley Bt JP DL
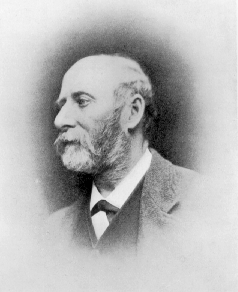
- Born: Percy Florence Shelley; 12 November 1819; Florence, Grand Duchy of Tuscany
- Died: 5 December 1889 (aged 70); Bournemouth, England
- Education: Harrow School; Trinity College, Cambridge
- Title: 3rd Baronet of Castle Goring
- Spouse: Jane Gibson (m. 1848)
- Children: Bessie Florence Gibson (adopted)
- Parent(s): Percy Bysshe Shelley; Mary Shelley

Sir Percy Florence Shelley, 3rd Baronet (12 November 1819 – 5 December 1889), was the son of the English writer and poet Percy Bysshe Shelley and his second wife, Mary Wollstonecraft Shelley, novelist and author of Frankenstein. He was the only child of Mary Wollstonecraft Shelley to live beyond infancy. His middle name, possibly suggested by his father's friend Sophia Stacey, came from the city of his birth, Florence in Italy. He had two elder half-siblings, by his father's first marriage to Harriet Westbrook, and three full siblings who died in infancy.

== Life ==
Shelley was born as the fourth child of the poet Percy Bysshe Shelley, his namesake, and his wife, author Mary Shelley. His elder siblings, consisting of a premature girl who died at a few weeks old and a brother and a sister who died in childhood, left him as the only surviving child after his mother suffered a miscarriage in 1822.

His parents lived in Italy for several years, until his father drowned near Livorno (then known to the English as Leghorn), whereupon his mother moved back to England with him. Mary Shelley never remarried; Percy had no further siblings. He joined Harrow School in 1832, and went up to Trinity College, Cambridge, in October 1837.

Shelley inherited the Shelley baronetcy upon the death of his grandfather, Timothy Shelley, in 1844, becoming the 3rd Baronet, of Castle Goring, Sussex. In 1845, giving his address as Putney (then a riverside village in Surrey just upstream of Clapham), he was elected to the Royal Thames Yacht Club.

On 22 June 1848, he married Jane Gibson, one of nine illegitimate children of Thomas Gibson, a wealthy Newcastle banker, by Ann Shevill; Jane was the widow of the Hon. Charles Robert St. John, son of the 3rd Viscount Bolingbroke and the Viscountess Bolingbroke, Baroness Hompesch. The couple had no children, although they adopted Jane's niece, Bessie Florence Gibson, the youngest child of Jane's brother Edward Gibson. Bessie Gibson married Lieutenant-Colonel Leopold James Yorke Campbell Scarlett (grandson of the 1st Baron Abinger, a politician and judge), and was the mother of Shelley, Robert and Hugh Scarlett, the 5th, 6th and 7th barons Abinger respectively.

In 1849, Shelley purchased Boscombe Manor, and carried out major building and alteration works between about 1850 and 1879. Around 1850, he built a temporary theatre in the garden but replaced this with a permanent internal theatre room in 1866.

He was appointed High Sheriff of Sussex in 1865. According to Yachting World, Shelley was a member of the prestigious and exclusive Royal Yacht Squadron at Cowes on the Isle of Wight.

Shelley died 5 December 1889 at Bournemouth, and was buried in the family vault in the churchyard of St Peter's Church, Bournemouth, reputedly with the heart of his father alongside him. In that vault, in addition to the patrilineal family, lie the remains of his maternal grandparents, namely Mary Wollstonecraft and William Godwin; Shelley and his wife were instrumental in moving their bones from St Pancras Old Church in London. The Shelley baronetcy passed to his first cousin, Edward Shelley (1827–1890), of Avington House, Hampshire, a Captain in the 16th Lancers, son of John Shelley (1806–1866), JP, DL, of Avington House, High Sheriff of Hampshire in 1853, the younger brother of Percy Bysshe Shelley.

== Passion for theatre ==
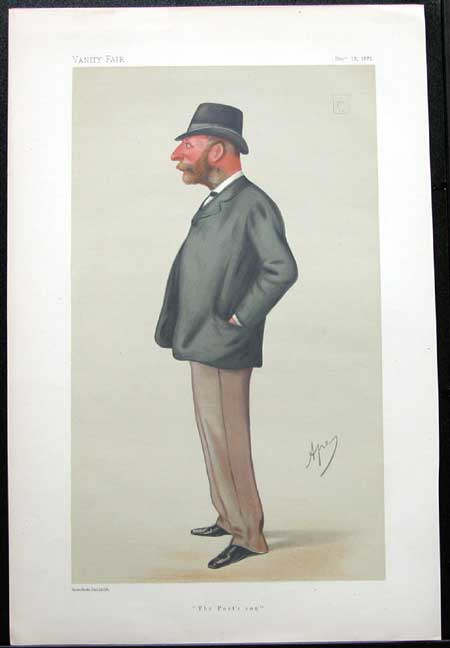
"The Poet's Son", a caricature by "Ape" (Carlo Pellegrini) published in Vanity Fair in 1879.

Shelley appeared in the 'Men of the Day' series in Vanity Fair in 1879 as "The Poet's Son", a caricature by "Ape", Carlo Pellegrini. The caption reads: "But he delights above all in yachting and in private theatricals, and is even now engaged in building a theatre for amateur performers. He is a gentleman." His London house he fitted with a private theatre; this was in Tite Street, Chelsea, a favoured and fashionable location for people of an artistic and literary disposition, according to The London Encyclopedia. While it was occupied by him and used for private performances, it caused no trouble. During a later period, however, it was rented to a tenant that used the facility for charity fund-raising performances where tickets were publicly sold, thus contravening the local bylaws.

Sir Percy also, with others, in Boscombe, Bournemouth, paid for a school to be built, and signed an Indenture with them, dated 2 October 1879, which stated that the school was to remain "...a schoolhouse and all other buildings hereafter to be erected thereon to be forever after appropriated and used as and for a school for the education of children and adults or children only of the manufacturing trading labouring and or other poorer classes residing in the parish of Christchurch and adjoining and neighbouring parishes and places...or as near thereto as circumstances will then permit."

In 1960, a local teacher, Leslie Williams, formed the Bournemouth Children's Theatre in the old school buildings, which later became the Drama Centre. Dame Sybil Thorndike became the patron of the centre and visited frequently. In the 1980s the Drama Centre was renamed the Bournemouth Centre for Community Arts (BCCA) to reflect its extension into other arts. Gareth Malone, later a choirmaster on BBC television programmes, attended. Despite protests from residents, Bournemouth Council demolished the building, other than two rooms. Residents raised money for a blue plaque to be placed on the two remaining rooms, to commemorate Sir Percy laying the foundation stone.

== Legacy ==
A blue plaque was installed, by Bournemouth Borough Council, on 30 June 1985, in honour of Shelley, at the entrance to his former home Boscombe Manor, now the Shelley Manor Medical Centre.

Robert Louis Stevenson dedicated his novel The Master of Ballantrae to Florence Shelley and his wife.

Baronetage of the United Kingdom
Preceded by Timothy Shelley	Baronet of Castle Goring; 1844–1889	Succeeded by Edward Shelley
