= Scarlet Knights (comics) =

Fictional comic book family

- Scarlet Knights

Publication information
- Publisher: Marvel Comics
- First appearance: New Excalibur #6 (June 2006)
- Created by: Chris Claremont; Michael Ryan

In-story information
- Member(s): Group Captain Arthur Hardy; Lisa Hardy; Squadron Leader Colin Hardy; Edward "Ned" Hardy; Malcolm Hardy; Jennifer Hardy "Little" Nell Hardy

The Scarlet Knights were a fictional British mutant family and Royal Air Force superteam appearing in American comic books published by Marvel Comics.

== Fiction team history ==
When the mutant X-gene catalyzed in Colin Hardy, his newly gained powers of flight somehow passed on to the other members of his family.

As part of the Royal Air Force, the squadron became part of its search and rescue personnel, with the mother and younger siblings handling peacetime jobs, and the father and the older siblings handling combat operations.

The Knights became famous for their annual Farnborough Airshow appearance, taking passengers and performing Red Arrow style air manoeuvre displays.

During the events of M-Day, in a bright flash of light, the family lost their powers mid-flight with a full complement of passengers. "They never had a prayer", it was said. Squadron Leader Colin was, seemingly, the only survivor. Colin's new-found hatred of Humankind over the death and depowerment of mutants all over the world, for which he assumed humans were responsible, led him to join with fellow depowered mutants and strike back by bombing the Main Line Railway Terminus in what was declared to be a "taste of what is to come."

== Speculation ==
Some consider Scarlet Knight Colin's attack to have been a suicide bombing, but Colin's speech would seem to indicate that he and others plan to perform more bombings.

The Scarlet Knight character has not been seen in any subsequent issues of the New Excalibur series, and with its cancellation Colin's fate may never be revealed.

== Bibliography ==
- New Excalibur #6
