= Scarlett Place =

Scarlett Place Residential Condominiums
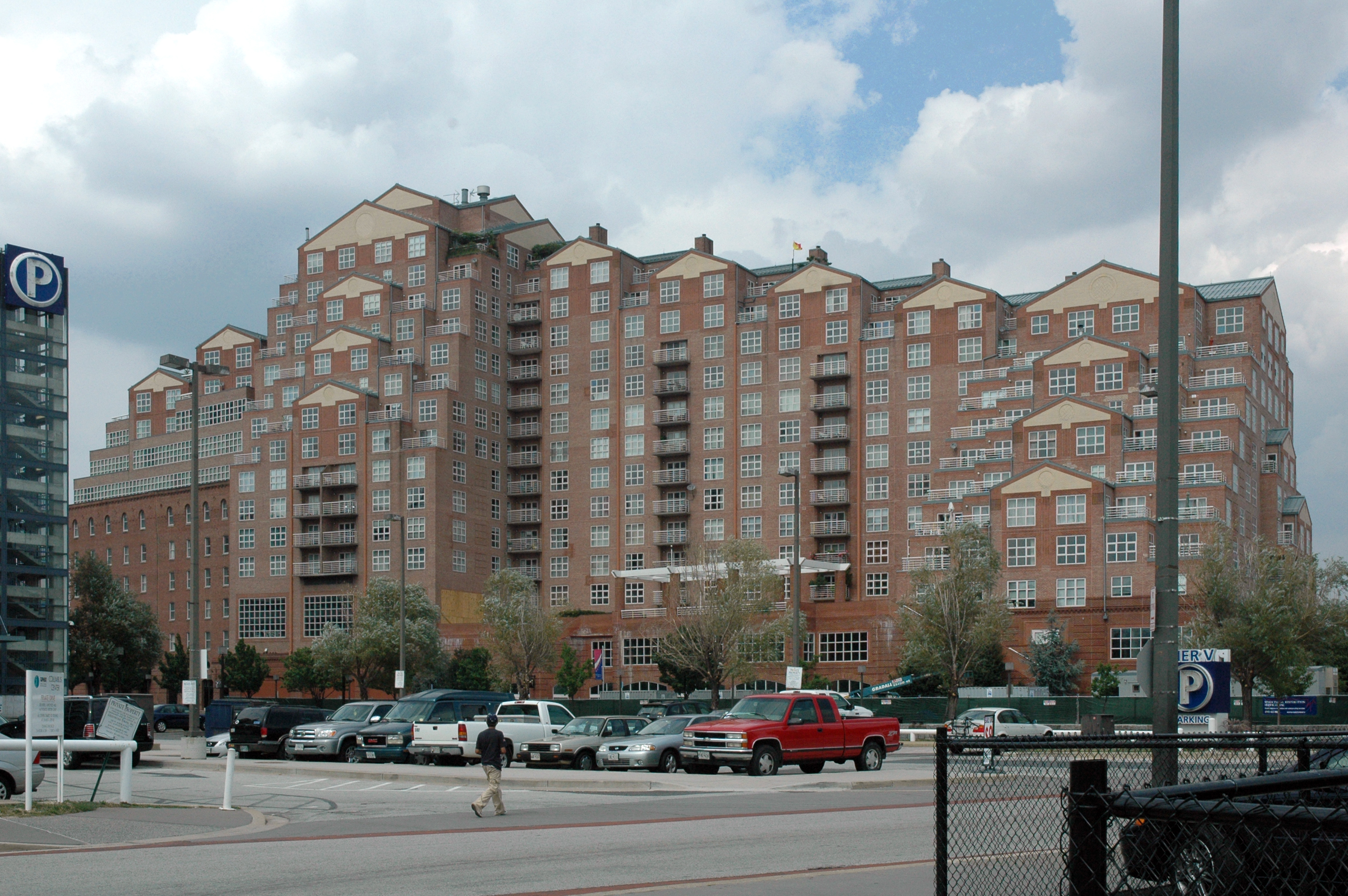
- Interactive map of the Scarlett Place Residential Condominiums area

General information
- Type: Mixed-use development
- Architectural style: Eclectic; Mediterranean
- Location: 250 President St, Baltimore City, Maryland, United States
- Coordinates: 39.28536°N 76.60372°W
- Named for: William Scarlett
- Inaugurated: 1989

Technical details
- Floor count: 14, atop 4 story garage
- Lifts/elevators: 5

Design and construction
- Architect: Leo D'Aleo

Scarlett Place is a residential condominium development in downtown Baltimore, overlooking the Inner Harbor and the Jones Falls canal, adjacent to Little Italy and Harbor East, and fronting on Columbus Park.

== History ==
In 1894, William G. Scarlett founded the William G. Scarlett Seed Company. It continued to be run for almost 100 years by Scarlett's sons and grandsons. After the company vacated the property in the 1980s, the site was developed into retail space, office space, and condominiums. Today, the Scarlett Seed Company Property is now known as Scarlett Place, paying tribute to the bird-seed businessmen.

The building, designed by local architect Leo D'Aleo, divides the Inner Harbor and Little Italy. It was modeled after a Mediterranean hillside and uses one of the original walls of the Scarlett Seed Factory.

== Notable past and current residents ==
- John P. Angelos
- John Richard Bryant
- Joyce Currie Little
- Maggie McIntosh
- Kevin Plank
- Diane Sypolt
