= Scarlett (song) =

2021 single by Holly Humberstone

Single by Holly Humberstone

from the EP The Walls Are Way Too Thin
- Released: 7 September 2021
- Genre: Synth-pop
- Length: 3:16
- Label: Polydor; Darkroom; Interscope
- Songwriters: Holly Ffion Humberstone; Rob Milton
- Producer: Rob Milton

Holly Humberstone singles chronology
"Please Don't Leave Just Yet" (2021)	"Scarlett" (2021)	"Friendly Fire" (2021)

Music video
- "Scarlett" on YouTube

"Scarlett" is a song recorded by English singer-songwriter Holly Humberstone. It was released on 7 September 2021 as the fourth single from her second extended play (EP), The Walls Are Way Too Thin (2021). Humberstone co-wrote the song with frequent collaborator Rob Milton, who also handled the production. A music video was released for "Scarlett" that featured Humberstone and Scarlett breaking into an airport hangar and Humberstone performing on top of a truck. It was shot in one take.

Humberstone wrote and named "Scarlett" after a close friend of hers. The lyrical content explores a toxic, one-sided relationship Scarlett had been in for years and the feeling of being unexpectedly broken up with. She wanted the track to have an uplifting and positive feel to it; she acknowledged that it therefore felt sonically and lyrically different to the other songs on The Walls Are Way Too Thin, but confessed it was a favourite of hers. "Scarlett" was praised by critics, with UDiscover Music billing it a "song with powerful immediacy and resonance" and NME calling it a "soaring synth-pop cut".

== Background and release ==
Humberstone's debut extended play (EP), Falling Asleep at the Wheel, was released in August 2020. She worked on the EP with Rob Milton; Milton had heard Humberstone on the radio and reached out to work with her. She continued working with Milton for her second project, which was eventually announced to be her second EP, The Walls Are Way Too Thin. Three other singles from the EP preceded the release of "Scarlett"; "Haunted House" was released as the lead in April 2021, followed by titular track "The Walls Are Way Too Thin" and "Please Don't Leave Just Yet". "Scarlett" was released on 7 September 2021.

== Composition and lyrics ==
"Scarlett" is a mid-tempo synth-pop song. It begins with a stripped-back instrumental, before drums, synths and harmonies begin in the chorus. Humberstone co-wrote "Scarlett" with frequent collaborator Rob Milton, who also produced it.

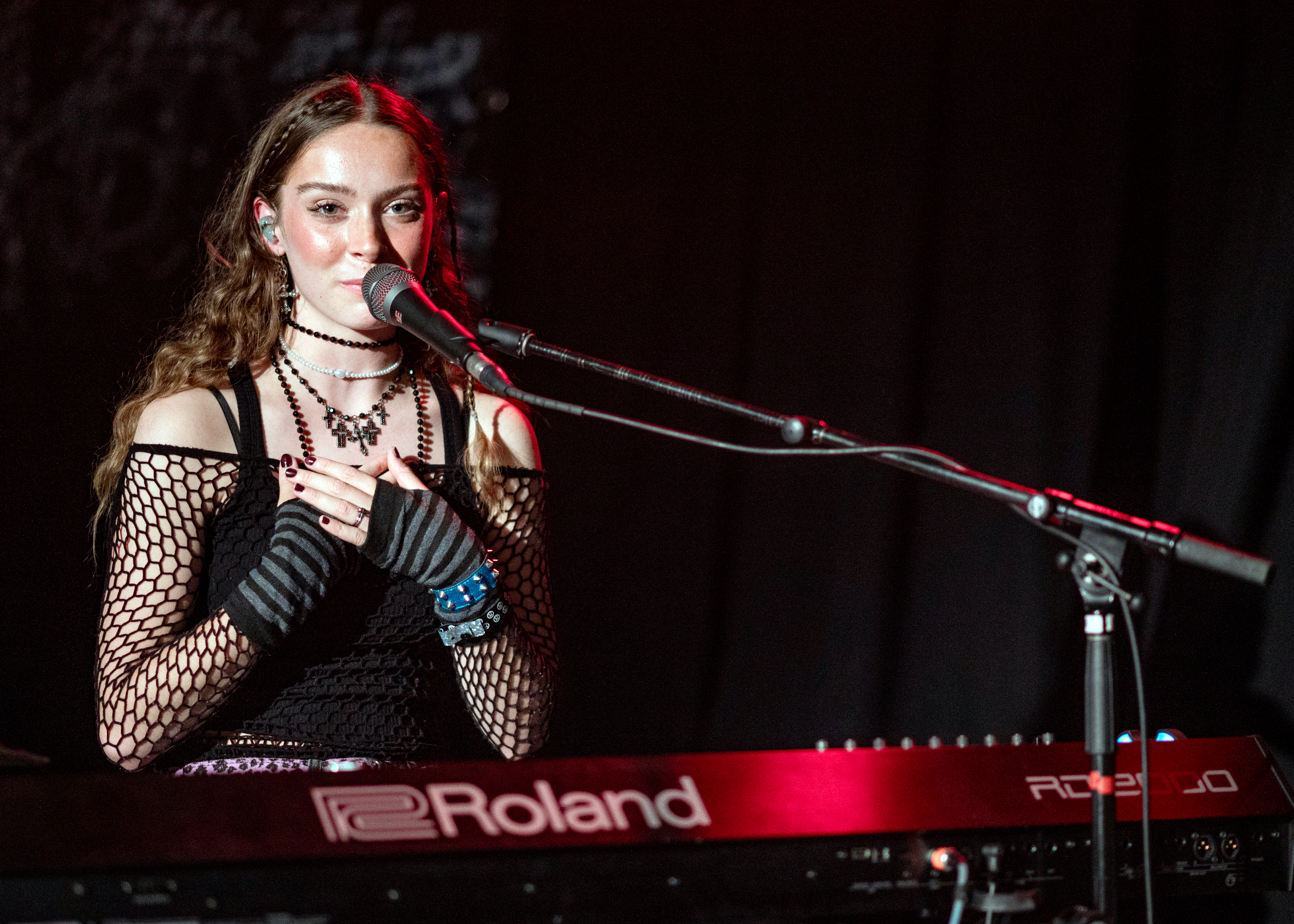
Humberstone wrote and titled "Scarlett" after her close friend.

The track's lyrical content dissects a romantic relationship that Scarlett, one of Humberstone's closest friends, had with a man. Humberstone had been Scarlett's "closest confidant" and had witnessed their "totally one sided" relationship for years. She wanted to write the song from Scarlett's perspective of being invested in him and having a future planned, "until he broke up with her in a really insensitive and heartless way". His breakup with Scarlett involved him calling her an "emotional grim reaper", which Humberstone and Milton incorporated into the song. Humberstone added: "It’s a fuck you to the guy that was going out with my closest friend Scarlett and it was written as they were breaking up. [...] I'd see how passive he was with her at parties first hand. She vented to me for probably about a year and so I went through all the stages of a break up with her and watched as she slowly realised her worth and that he wasn’t worth her tears anymore."

Humberstone acknowledged that "Scarlett" was sonically and lyrically different from the rest of The Walls Are Way Too Thin. She felt it important for the track and its accompanying music video to be empowering, as "a reminder that you can shake off anything rubbish going on in your life and be in control of your own destiny". She confessed that it was her favourite track to date and was glad she could lyrically explore a toxic relationship.

== Music video ==
A music video for "Scarlett" was released alongside the track. The video was shot in one take. It stars Humberstone and her friend Scarlett; Humberstone commented that "obviously the song is about Scarlett so she had to be in the video - especially after being named an 'emotional grim reaper'". The video features the pair breaking into an airport hangar, stealing and spray painting an arctic truck, after which Humberstone performs on the back of it as Scarlett drives it down the runway. Humberstone found it to be the "most fun" experience.

== Critical reception ==
UDiscover Music billed "Scarlett" a "song with powerful immediacy and resonance." Euphoria wrote: "if there was a song that would make you feel like the main character in the middle of the worst breakup, "Scarlett" would be it. As comprehensive and rich it is sonically, it's just as such in its lyrical content." NME also praised the track, billing it a "soaring synth-pop cut". Far Out commended Humberstone's sonic choices, writing that "whenever you might think you know where things are going, Humberstone throws in an unexpected lyrical change or flips the arrangement to keep you on your toes". Atwood found it to be one of Humberstone's "most electrifying songs to date" and appreciated the "blissful euphoria arriving at the tail end of a prolonged cycle of pain, heartbreak, and tension" depicted in the lyrical content.

== Credits and personnel ==
Credits adapted from Spotify.

- Holly Humberstone – vocals, songwriting
- Rob Milton – songwriting, production, programming, guitar, synthesizer, engineering
- Lee Smith – mixing
- Mike Bozzi – mastering engineer

== Charts ==
Weekly chart performance
Chart (2021)	Peak position
Switzerland Airplay (Swiss Hitparade)	86

Weekly chart performance
Chart (2025)	Peak position
UK Singles Sales (OCC)	35

== Release history ==
Region	Date	Format	Label	Ref.
Various	7 September 2021	Digital download; streaming	Polydor; Darkroom; Interscope	
Various	5 December 2025	Vinyl EP	Polydor; Darkroom; Interscope	
