= Shelley Memorial =

Memorial to the English poet Percy Bysshe Shelley

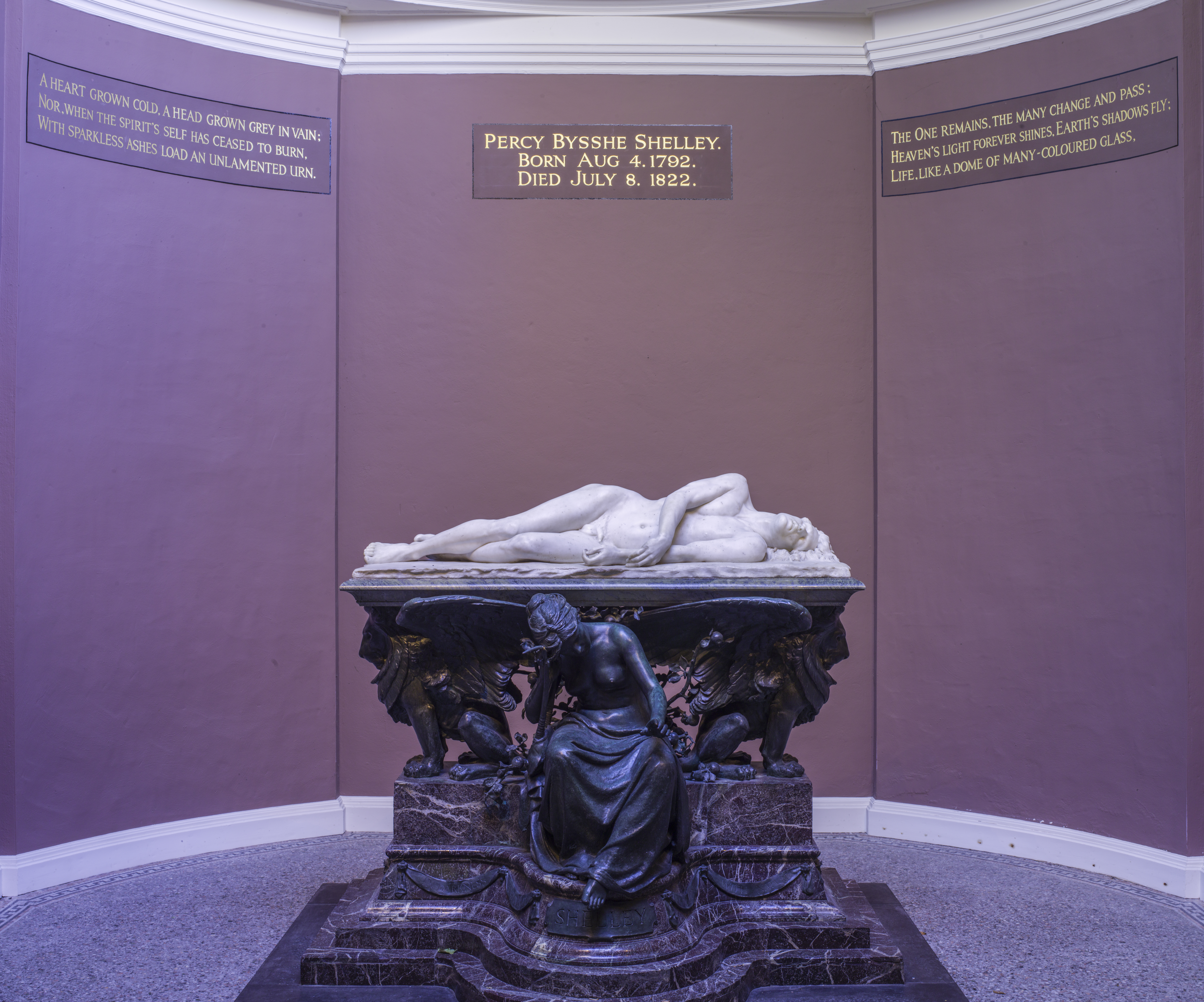
- The Shelley Memorial at University College, Oxford
- Interactive map of Shelley Memorial
- Location: University College, Oxford, England
- Coordinates: 51.75257°N 1.25244°W
- Designer: Edward Onslow Ford (sculpture); Basil Champneys (room)
- Type: Sculpture
- Material: Marble
- Completion date: 1892
- Dedicated date: 1893
- Dedicated to: Percy Bysshe Shelley
- Website: univ.ox.ac.uk

The Shelley Memorial is a memorial to the English poet Percy Bysshe Shelley (1792–1822) at University College, Oxford, England, the college that he briefly attended and from which he was expelled for writing the 1811 pamphlet "The Necessity of Atheism".

Although Shelley was expelled from the college, he remains one of its most famous alumni and is now held in high honour there. In 2005, the college acquired some of Shelley's letters to further enhance its connection with the poet.

== Statue ==
The memorial consists of a white marble sculpture of a reclining nude and dead Shelley washed up on the shore at Viareggio in Italy after his drowning, sculpted by Edward Onslow Ford, who was associated with the New Sculpture movement. It is set on a decorative plinth in a small domed late Victorian room designed by Basil Champneys, behind ornamental railings that protect it from students.

The statue was commissioned by Shelley's daughter-in-law, Lady Jane Shelley. It was originally intended to be located in the Protestant Cemetery in Rome, where Shelley is buried, at the request of adventurer Edward John Trelawny, a friend of Shelley. Trelawny wanted to have a monument of the poet next to his own. However, Trelawny's descendants thought that Ford's statue was too large and thus did not consent to his wishes. Eventually, the statue ended up at University College, donated by Lady Shelley, with a formal opening ceremony on 14 June 1893. Among others, Lady Shelley, Onslow Ford, Champneys, and Benjamin Jowett were present at the opening ceremony.

The memorial has been the victim of a number of pranks over the years. The college's chemistry don, E. J. Bowen, had to clean paint off the statue, for example. The room in which it is housed has also been flooded with water and goldfish. The sculpture originally had a gilt-bronze laurel wreath on Shelley's brow, but this was removed during the 1930s due to the number of student pranks.

The statue was a key element in the meeting of two main characters in the 1997 film The Saint, starring Val Kilmer and Elisabeth Shue, and also features in an episode (And the Moonbeams Kiss the Sea) of the British TV drama, Lewis. The body of a murdered student, purportedly drowned, mirrors the position of Shelley's in the memorial sculpture.

== Boyle–Hooke plaque ==
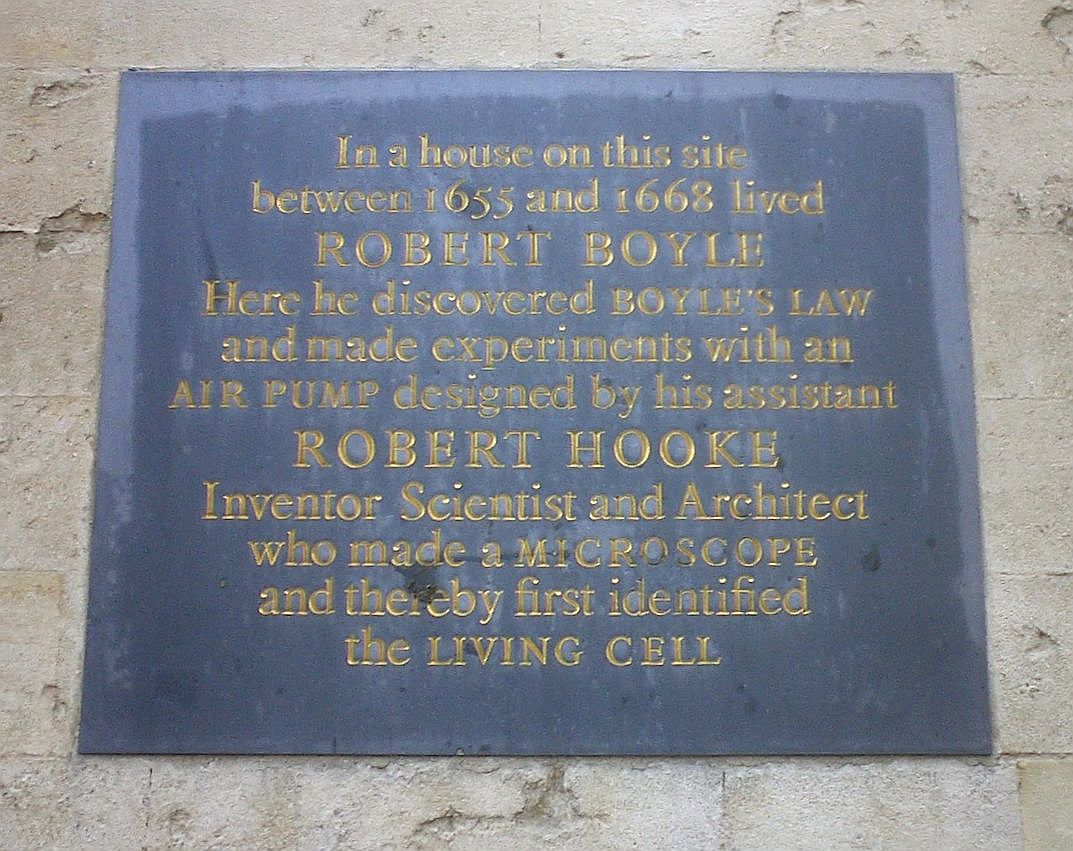
The Boyle-Hooke plaque on the outside of the Shelley Memorial in the High Street, Oxford

The Shelley Memorial is on the site where the scientists Robert Boyle and Robert Hooke performed experiments while they were in Oxford, previously Cross Hall, until the early 19th century. This is recorded for passers-by, on a plaque on the exterior wall of the memorial in the High Street, that reads:

In a house on this site
between 1655 and 1668 lived
ROBERT BOYLE
Here he discovered BOYLE'S LAW
and made experiments with an
AIR PUMP designed by his assistant
ROBERT HOOKE
Inventor Scientist and Architect
who made a MICROSCOPE
and thereby first identified
the LIVING CELL

== See also ==
- Keats–Shelley Memorial House, Rome, Italy
- Oxford Spanish Civil War memorial
