= RU-27 =

Experimental American autonomous underwater vehicle

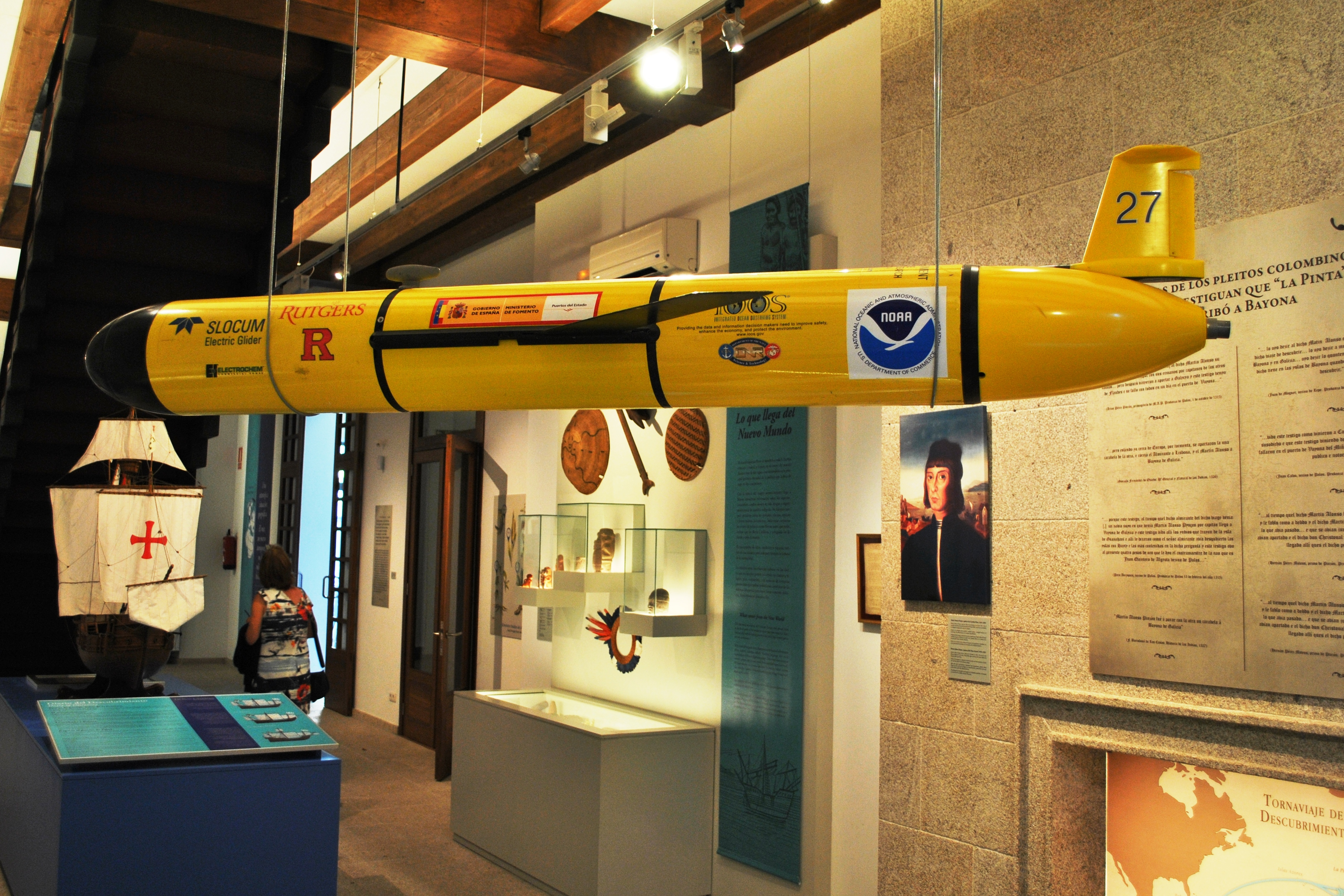
RU-27 in Baiona, Pontevedra.

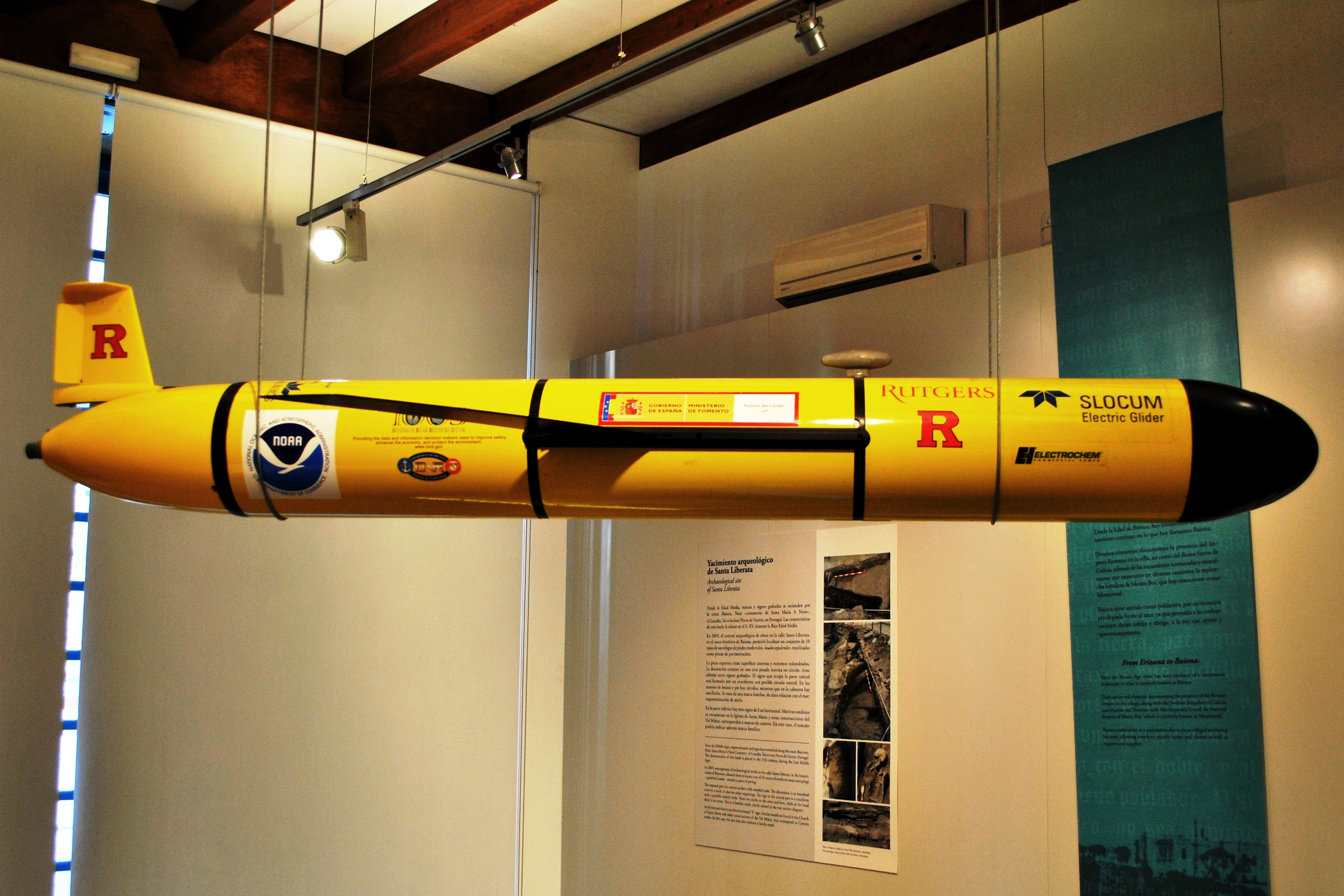

RU-27, dubbed Scarlet Knight after the Rutgers Scarlet Knights athletic teams, is an experimental American autonomous underwater vehicle – a modified Slocum Autonomous Underwater Gliding Vehicle – operated by Rutgers University oceanographers. In December 2009, Scarlet Knight was the first robot to cross the Atlantic Ocean underwater, which took it 221 days.
