= Andrea Carlo Lucchesi =

Anglo-Italian sculptor

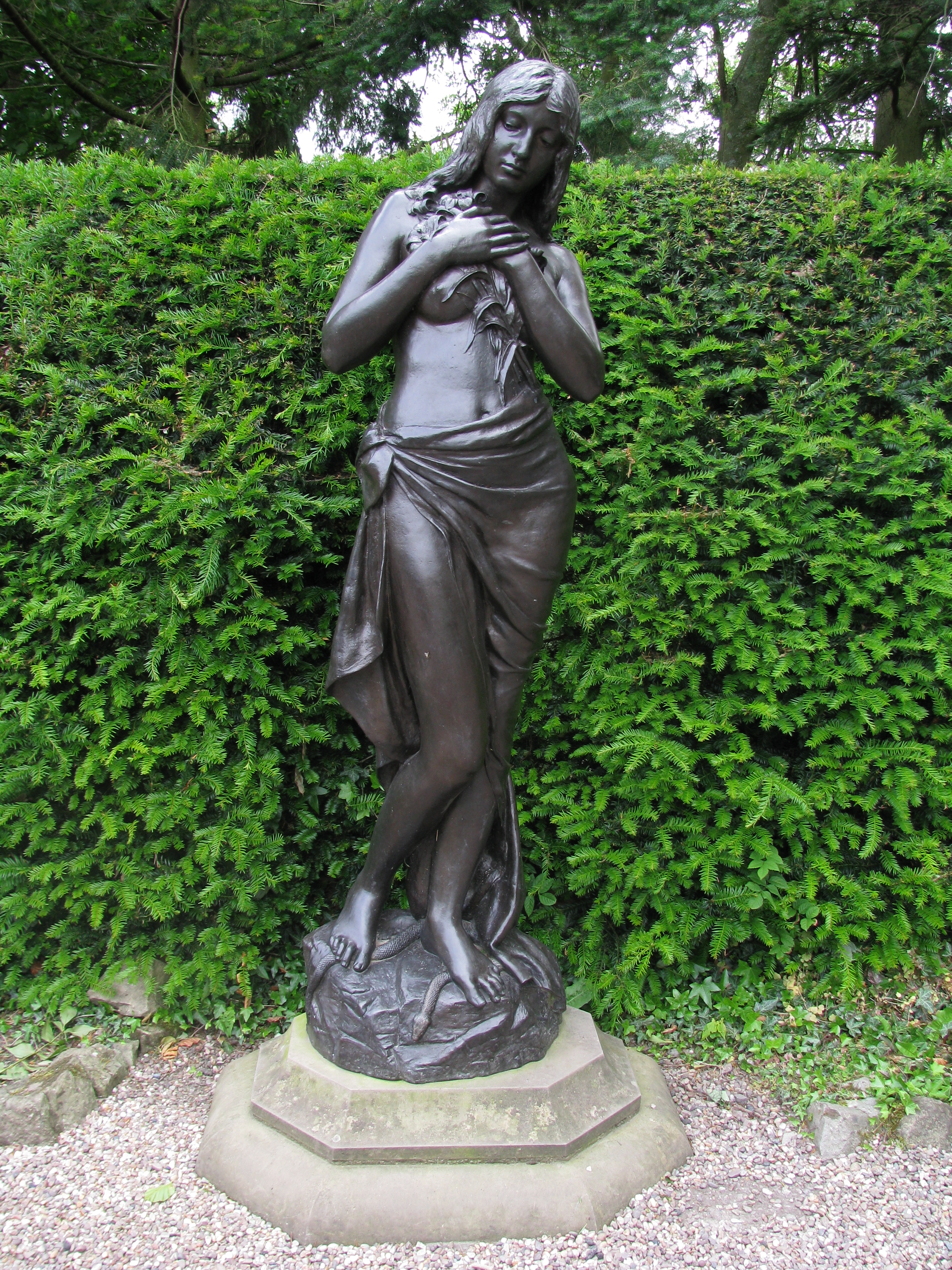
A bronze nymph in the gardens of Chirk Castle

Andrea Carlo Lucchesi (19 October 1859 – 9 April 1925) was an Anglo-Italian sculptor, born and trained in London, who had a career in the United Kingdom as an exponent of the naturalistic and symbolist "New Sculpture". His portrait of Queen Victoria is on the facade of the Art Gallery, at Bath. Lucchesi received his early training from his father, also a sculptor, and at the West London School of Art; he first exhibited at the Royal Academy in 1881. In 1882 his Waif won him acceptance at the Royal Academy schools, where he remained five years (1881–86). He was a member of the Art Workers Guild, established in 1884 to promote the "unity of the arts"

Lucchesi specialised in the female nude, naturalistically represented under allegorical titles, such as Destiny and the undisguisedly erotic Myrtle's Altar (1899), manifesting clear influences of Art Nouveau and, in the finely modelled symbolic representations of crown, sword, spilled bag of coins, of Symbolism. In addition to his own work, he assisted Henry Hugh Armstead and Edward Onslow Ford, and provided models for electroplate silverware by Elkington & Company and the Crown Jewelers, Garrard's. He also produced portrait busts: his bronze bust of Sir John Franklin (1898) is conserved at the National Portrait Gallery, London.

After Edward Onslow Ford's death Lucchesi worked on his memorial, designed by architect John William Simpson, which now stands in Abbey Road, St. John's Wood, London, close to Ford's former home (and also close to what is now Abbey Road Studios and its famous zebra crossing). Lucchesi's contribution comprises a wreathed bust of Ford on the rear, bearing the inscription (quoting William Shakespeare's Hamlet) "To thine own self be true"; and a mourning figure based on Ford's Muse of Poetry (now in Canterbury). Ford's original statue is a standing semi-nude female figure, depicted singing and playing a lyre. In Lucchesi's memorial sculpture she is shown seated in a melancholy pose with the lyre resting against her body.
