= Shelley Scarlett, 5th Baron Abinger =

Royal Navy officer

Commander The Right Honourable The Lord Abinger
- Lord Abinger in the First World War

Member of the House of Lords
- Lord Temporal
- In office 11 December 1903 – 23 May 1917
- Preceded by: The 4th Baron Abinger
- Succeeded by: The 6th Baron Abinger

Personal details
- Born: Shelley Leopold Laurence Scarlett; 1 April 1872
- Died: 23 May 1917 (aged 45) London, England
- Military career
- Burial place: Brookwood Cemetery
- Allegiance: United Kingdom
- Branch: British Army; Royal Naval Volunteer Reserve
- Rank: Commander
- Units: 3rd Battalion, Bedfordshire Regiment
- Conflicts: First World War

Shelley Leopold Laurence Scarlett, 5th Baron Abinger (1 April 1872 – 23 May 1917), was a British hereditary peer and military officer.

Scarlett was the son of Lieutenant Colonel Leopold James Yorke Campbell Scarlett, and a great-grandson of the 1st Baron Abinger. His mother had been adopted by Sir Percy Shelley, 3rd Baronet, son of Mary and Percy Bysshe Shelley.

== Career ==
Scarlett served as an Honorary Attaché in Stockholm from 1897 to 1899.

Scarlett succeeded his childless second cousin, James Scarlett, in the barony in 1903. In 1904, a royal warrant of precedence was issued, which allowed Scarlett's siblings (Robert, Hugh, Ruth, Percy, and Leopold) to be styled Honourable.

Scarlett served in the First World War from 1914, holding the rank of captain and honorary major in the 3rd Battalion, Bedfordshire Regiment. On 17 October 1915, Scarlett was awarded a temporary commission in the Royal Naval Volunteer Reserve with the honorary rank of commander. Serving under the Director of the Intelligence Division, he ran intelligence gathering operations in the south of neutral Spain.

Scarlett was serving at the Admiralty at the time of his death in May 1917, aged 45. He was buried at Brookwood Cemetery.

== Marriage ==
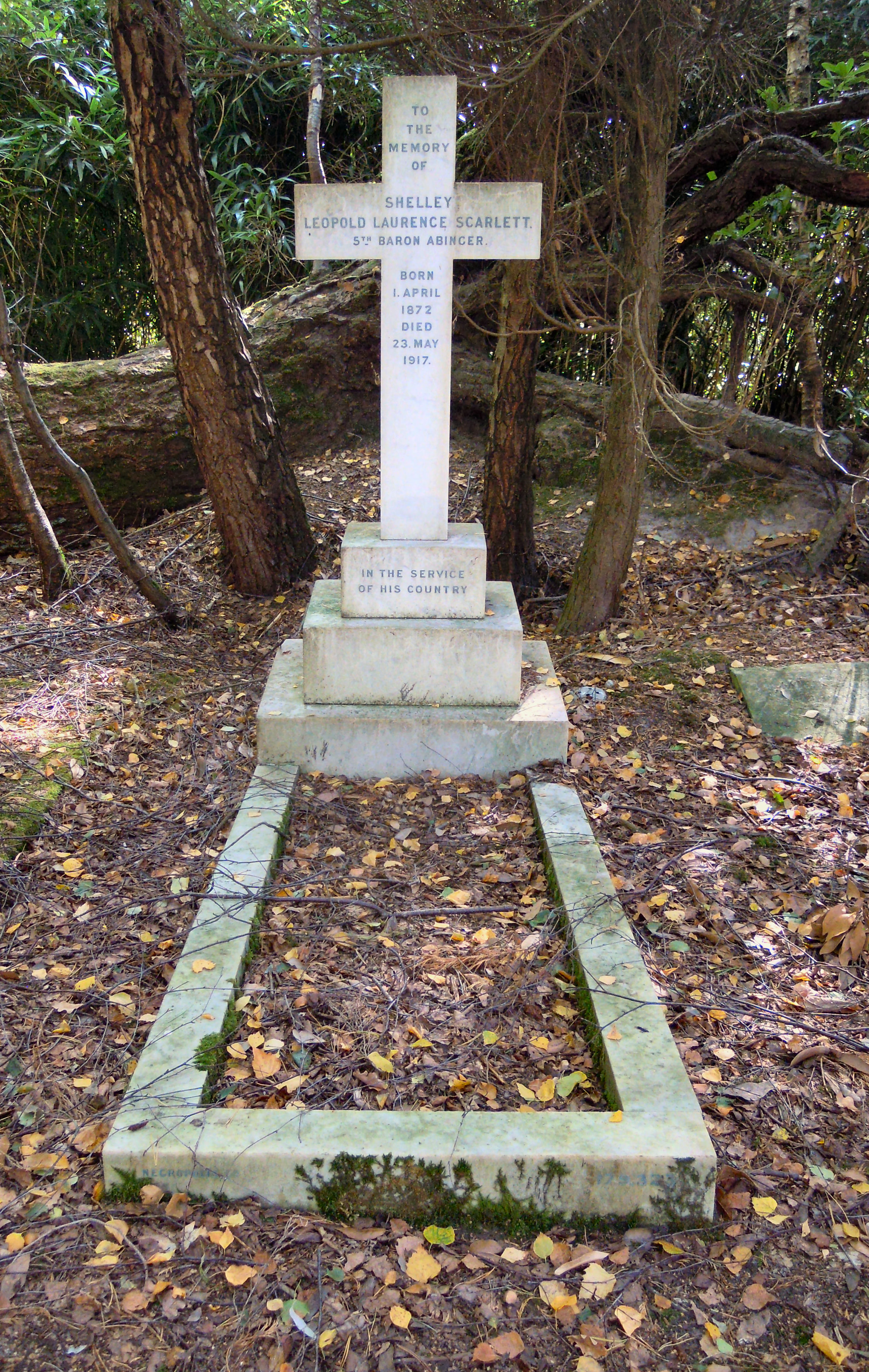
Grave of Shelley Scarlett, 5th Baron Abinger, in Brookwood Cemetery

Scarlett married Lila Lucy Catherine Mary Geijer (née White), daughter of Sir William Arthur White, in 1899. They had no children, and he was succeeded as Lord Abinger by his brother Robert.

Peerage of the United Kingdom
Preceded by James Scarlett	Baron Abinger; 1903–1917; Member of the House of Lords (1903–1917)	Succeeded by Robert Scarlett
