= Baron Abinger =

Title in the Peerage of the United Kingdom

- Arms: Chequy Or and Gules, a Lion rampant Ermine, on a Canton Azure, a Castle triple-towered Argent. Crest: A Tuscan Column chequy Or and Gules, supported on either side by a Lion's Gamb Ermines, erased Gules. Supporters: On either side an Angel proper, vested Argent, tunic Azure, wings Or, in the exterior hand a Sword proper, pommel and hilt Or.
- Creation date: 12 June 1835
- Created by: King William IV
- Peerage: United Kingdom
- First holder: James Scarlett, 1st Baron Abinger
- Present holder: James Scarlett, 9th Baron Abinger
- Heir presumptive: Harry Alexander Peter Scarlett
- Remainder to: the 1st Baron's heirs male of the body lawfully begotten.
- Status: Extant
- Motto: SUIS STAT VIRBUS (He stands by his own strength)

Baron Abinger, of Abinger in the County of Surrey and of the City of Norwich, is a title in the Peerage of the United Kingdom. It was created on 12 January 1835 for the prominent lawyer and politician Sir James Scarlett, the Lord Chief Baron of the Exchequer. Lord Abinger was succeeded by his eldest son, the second baron. He represented Norwich and Horsham in the House of Commons. He was succeeded by his son, the third baron. He was a lieutenant-general in the army and fought in the Crimean War. On the death of his son, the fourth baron, the line of the eldest son of the first baron failed. The late baron was succeeded by his second cousin, the fifth baron. He was the grandson of Peter Campbell Scarlett, third son of the first baron. When he died the title passed to his younger brother, the sixth baron, and then to another brother, the seventh baron. As of 2016 the title is held by the latter's grandson, the ninth baron, who succeeded his father in 2002.

Sir James Yorke Scarlett, second son of the first baron, was a general in the army and fought in the Crimean War. Mary Elizabeth, daughter of the first baron, was created Baroness Stratheden in 1836. She was the wife of John Campbell, 1st Baron Campbell.

Prior to the abolition of slavery in the British Empire, the Scarlett family generated significant wealth through the operation of sugar plantations in Jamaica, including the Cambridge, Duckenfield, and Success estates in the parish of Trelawny. Following the passage of the Slavery Abolition Act 1833, members of the Scarlett family filed numerous successful compensation claims for the loss of their enslaved workforce. According to data compiled by the Centre for the Study of the Legacies of British Slavery at University College London, nine individuals from the Scarlett family received a combined total of government compensation payouts for over 800 enslaved people. This capital was subsequently repatriated to Great Britain, assisting the family's transition into the British peerage and the acquisition of domestic estates.

== Baron Abinger (1835) ==
- James Scarlett, 1st Baron Abinger (1769–1844)
- Robert Campbell Scarlett, 2nd Baron Abinger (1794–1861)
- William Frederick Scarlett, 3rd Baron Abinger (1826–1892)
- James Yorke Macgregor Scarlett, 4th Baron Abinger (1871–1903)
- Shelley Leopold Laurence Scarlett, 5th Baron Abinger (1872–1917)
- Robert Brooke Campbell Scarlett, 6th Baron Abinger (1876–1927)
- Hugh Richard Scarlett, 7th Baron Abinger (1878–1943)
- James Richard Scarlett, 8th Baron Abinger (1914–2002)
- James Harry Scarlett, 9th Baron Abinger (born 1959)

The heir presumptive is the present holder's nephew, Harry Alexander Peter Scarlett (born 1997).

=== Title succession chart ===
Title succession chart, Barons Abinger

James Scarlett; 1st Baron Abinger; 1769–1844
Robert Scarlett; 2nd Baron Abinger; 1794–1861	Brig.Gen. Hon. James Yorke Scarlett; 1799–1871	Hon. Peter Scarlett; 1804–1881
William Scarlett; 3rd Baron Abinger; 1826–1892	Hon. James Scarlett; 1830–1845	Peter Scarlett; 1846–1847	Lt.Col. Leopold Scarlett; 1847–1888
James Scarlett; 4th Baron Abinger; 1871–1903	Shelley Scarlett; 5th Baron Abinger; 1872–1917	Robert Scarlett; 6th Baron Abinger; 1876–1927	Lawrence Scarlett; 1877–1893	Hugh Scarlett; 7th Baron Abinger; 1878–1943
James Scarlett; 8th Baron Abinger; 1914–2002
James Scarlett; 9th Baron Abinger born 1959	Hon. Peter Scarlett; 1961–2020
Harry Scarlett born 1997

== See also ==
- Baron Stratheden
