= Robert Scarlett, 6th Baron Abinger =

British peer (1876–1927)

The Right Honourable The Lord Abinger

Member of the House of Lords
- Lord Temporal
- In office 23 May 1917 – 10 June 1927
- Preceded by: The 5th Baron Abinger
- Succeeded by: The 7th Baron Abinger

Personal details
- Born: Robert Brooke Campbell Scarlett; 8 January 1876
- Died: 10 June 1927 (aged 51)
- Profession: Barrister

Robert Brooke Campbell Scarlett, 6th Baron Abinger (8 January 1876 – 10 June 1927), was a British peer.

== Personal life and family ==
Scarlett was the second son of Lieutenant Colonel Leopold James Yorke Campbell Scarlett and Bessie Florence (née Gibson). In 1904, Scarlett, along with his siblings Hugh, Ruth, Percy, and Leopold, were authorised to use the style Honourable by a royal warrant of precedence. He succeeded his older brother Shelley as Baron Abinger in 1917.

Scarlett was a barrister of the Inner Temple and served in the Royal Navy.

In 1917, Lord Abinger married Marguerite Jeanne Steinheil (née Japy). Steinheil's claims to fame hitherto rested partly from having been obliquely described as present at the death of French President Félix Faure in 1899 and for having been acquitted of murdering her husband in 1909. They had no children, and the title of Baron Abinger passed to the 6th Baron's younger brother Hugh.

Peerage of the United Kingdom
Preceded by Shelley Scarlett	Baron Abinger; 1917–1927; Member of the House of Lords (1917–1927)	Succeeded by Hugh Scarlett
