= Puya × berteroniana =

Scientific classification
- Kingdom: Plantae
- Clade: Embryophytes
- Clade: Tracheophytes
- Clade: Spermatophytes
- Clade: Angiosperms
- Clade: Monocots
- Clade: Commelinids
- Order: Poales
- Family: Bromeliaceae
- Genus: Puya
- Species: P. × berteroniana

Binomial name
- Puya × berteroniana Mez

Species of plant

Puya × berteroniana is a natural hybrid in the genus Puya, between the species Puya alpestris subsp. zoellneri and Puya venusta. This natural hybrid is endemic to central Chile, where it is very rare.

A revision of the Chilean species of Puya found that it is likely a hybrid, given its rarity and intermediate characteristics between several species. Additionally, the name Puya berteroniana has been widely misapplied to plants of one of its parental species, Puya alpestris. The plant is a rarely branching plant to 4.5 m (15 ft) in height with long, slender leaves with spined margins. The flower stalk is up to 3 m (10 ft) tall. The flower colour is unknown; older reports citing intense blue-green flowers, apply to P. alpestris misidentified.
