= Inverlochy =

Inverlochy may refer to:

- Inverlochy, Highland
- Inverlochy Castle
- Battle of Inverlochy (1431)
- Battle of Inverlochy (1645)
