= James Scarlett, 4th Baron Abinger =

British peer (1871–1903)

The Right Honourable The Lord Abinger
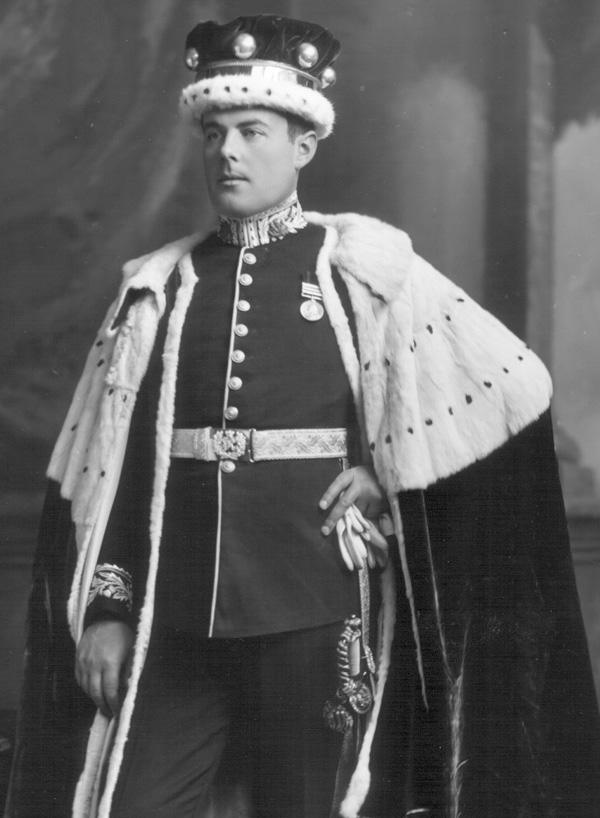
- Lord Abinger wearing coronation robes and the coronet of a baron, 1902

Member of the House of Lords
- Lord Temporal
- In office 16 January 1892 – 11 December 1903
- Preceded by: The 3rd Baron Abinger
- Succeeded by: The 5th Baron Abinger

Personal details
- Born: James Yorke Macgregor Scarlett; 13 March 1871 London, England
- Died: 11 December 1903 (aged 32) Paris, France
- Parent: William Scarlett, 3rd Baron Abinger (father)
- Relatives: Ella Campbell Scarlett (sister); Evelina Haverfield (sister); Robert Scarlett (grandfather); James Scarlett (great-grandfather)
- Education: Trinity College, Cambridge (BA, MA)

James Yorke Macgregor Scarlett, 4th Baron Abinger (13 March 1871 – 11 December 1903), was a British peer.

== Life ==
James Yorke Macgregor Scarlett was educated at Eton and Trinity College, Cambridge. He was a captain in the 3rd Battery Queen's Own Cameron Highlanders, and saw active service in the Second Boer War, leaving England for South Africa in February 1900.

He owned 41,000 acres (200 km^{2}). His town address was at 46 Cornwall Gardens, but he also owned Inverlochy Castle (today Inverlochy Castle Hotel), Invernessshire. He was a member of the Carlton Club.

He died of heart failure caused by an accidental fall down a flight of stairs at a restaurant in Paris, France.

== Family ==
Scarlett was the son of William Scarlett, 3rd Baron Abinger, and his wife Helen (née Magruder). Evelina Haverfield was his sister. He succeeded his father in the barony in 1892, and died unmarried without male heirs. The barony then fell to his second cousin Shelley Scarlett, who descended from the third son of the 1st Baron Abinger.

Peerage of the United Kingdom
Preceded by William Scarlett	Baron Abinger; 1892–1903; Member of the House of Lords (1892–1903)	Succeeded by Shelley Scarlett
