= Achamore House =

House in Argyll and Bute, Scotland

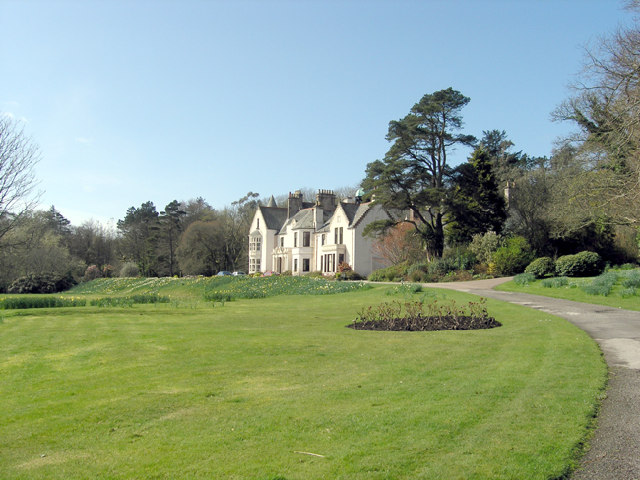
- Achamore House

- Location of Achamore House on Gigha
- 55.6670°N 5.7499°W
- Location: Isle of Gigha, Argyll and Bute, Scotland

History
- Built: 1884
- Built for: William Scarlett, 3rd Baron Abinger

Site notes
- Architect: John Honeyman
- Architectural style: Scots Baronial

Listed Building – Category B
- Official name: Achamore House
- Designated: 20 July 1971
- Reference no.: LB11449

Inventory of Gardens and Designed Landscapes in Scotland
- Official name: Achamore House
- Criteria: Work of Art; Horticultural
- Designated: 1 July 1987
- Reference no.: GDL00005

Achamore House is a mansion on the Isle of Gigha, Scotland. It was built in 1884 for Lt-Col William James Scarlett, and the extensive gardens were laid out by Sir James Horlick from 1944. The house is protected as a category B listed building, while the grounds are included in the Inventory of Gardens and Designed Landscapes in Scotland.

== History ==
The island of Gigha was formerly the property of the Clan McNeill until John Carstairs MacNeill, who sold the island in 1856 to James Williams Scarlett, second son of William Anglin Scarlett, for £49,000. James Scarlett's son, Lt-Col William James Scarlett, a veteran of the Crimean War like his cousin William Scarlett, 3rd Baron Abinger, built Achamore House in 1884. The house was designed by John Honeyman of Honeyman and Keppie Architects. After it was damaged by fire in 1896, John Honeyman was again employed to restore and remodel the house, which was completed in 1900.

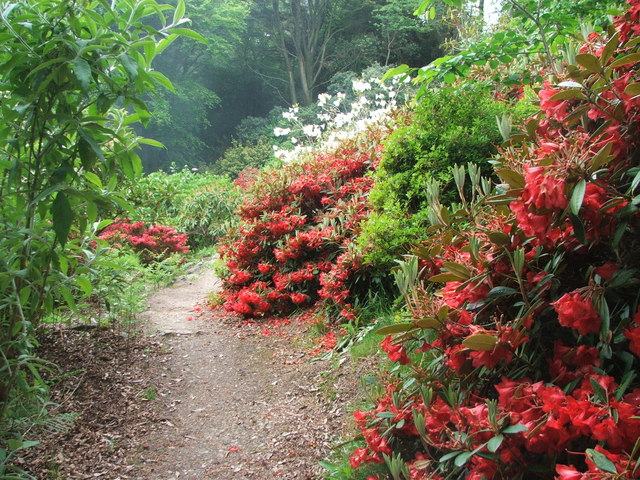
Rhododendrons in flower at Achamore Gardens

The island remained in the Scarlett family until 1919 when it was sold to a Major John Allen, and subsequently bought in 1937 by Richard and Elaine Hamer (née de Chair), daughter of Admiral Sir Dudley de Chair. During the Second World War it passed to Elaine Hamer's brother, Somerset de Chair, who sold it on to Colonel Sir James Horlick in 1944, who bought the island in order to extend his plant collection, which he had been developing at Titness Park in Berkshire. He undertook plantings across some 50 acres (200,000 m^{2}) of gardens surrounding the house. The estate was again sold in 1973 after Horlick's death to James Landale, but the plant collection was given to the National Trust for Scotland.

The next owner in 1989 was Malcolm Potier, later jailed for violence and attempted murder, followed by the Holt family until in 2002 the island was purchased by its residents, and ownership of the house and gardens passed to the Isle of Gigha Heritage Trust. In order to pay back loans used for the community buy-out, the house was sold in 2003 and now operates as bed and breakfast accommodation.

The property was relisted for sale in 2012, and having sought Offers over £750,000, it was sold in December 2020.

The Achamore Gardens are owned by the Heritage Trust, and are open to the public. The mild climate of the Inner Hebrides, and the microclimate of the gardens, allows an unusual range of plants to flourish. The gardens include specimens of southern rātā from New Zealand, Montezuma pine from Central America, Puya alpestris from the Andes, and Wollemia nobilis from Australia.
