= Evelina Haverfield =

British suffragette and aid worker (1867–1920)

The Honourable Evelina Haverfield
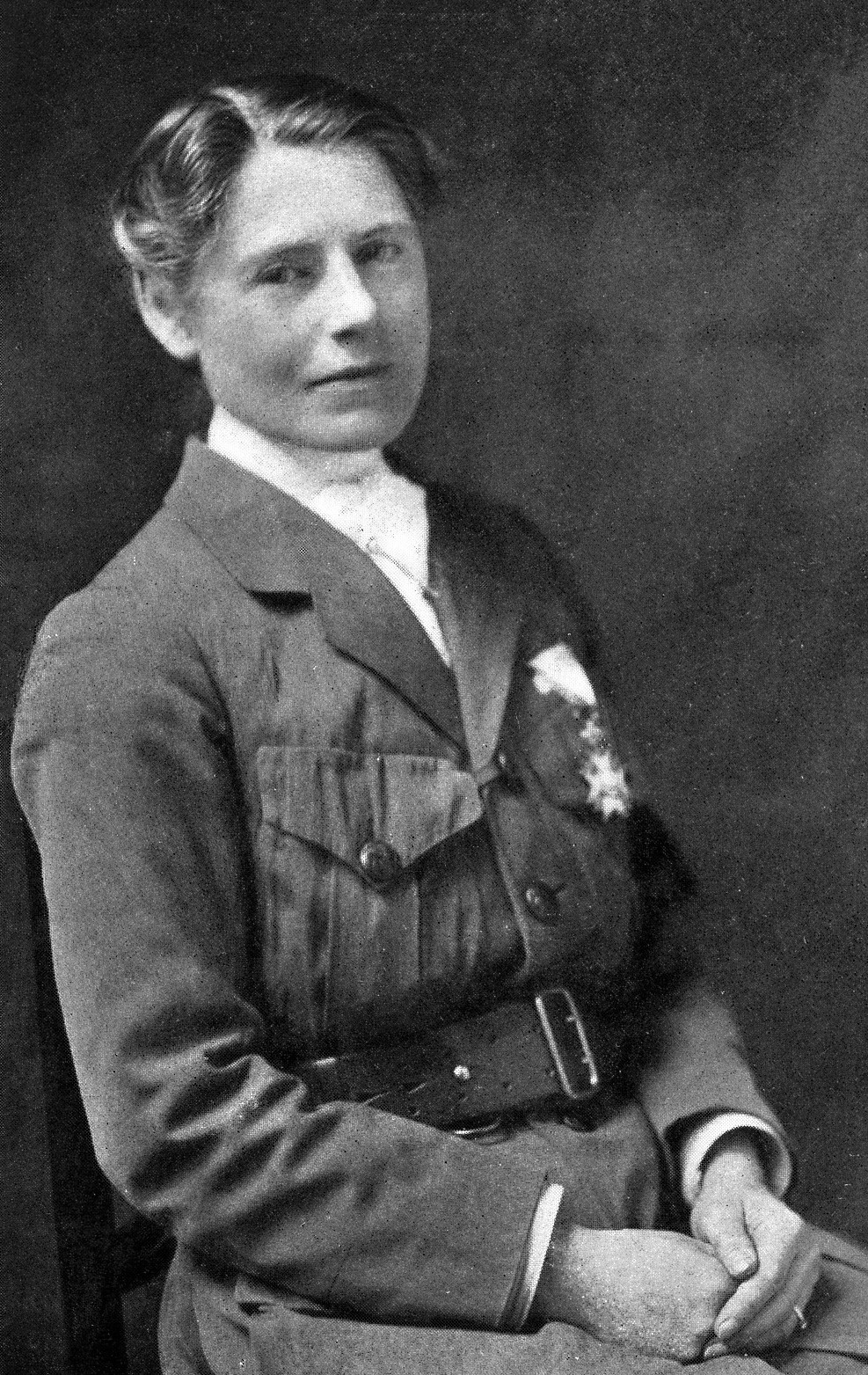
- Born: Evilena Scarlett; 9 August 1867; Kingussie, Scotland
- Died: 21 March 1920 (aged 52); Bajina Bašta, Serbia
- Occupations: Social activist; suffragette
- Spouses: Henry Haverfield (m. 1887; died 1895) John Balguy (m. 1899)
- Father: William Scarlett, 3rd Baron Abinger
- Relatives: James Scarlett, 4th Baron Abinger (brother); Ella Campbell Scarlett (sister); Robert Scarlett (grandfather); James Scarlett (great-grandfather)

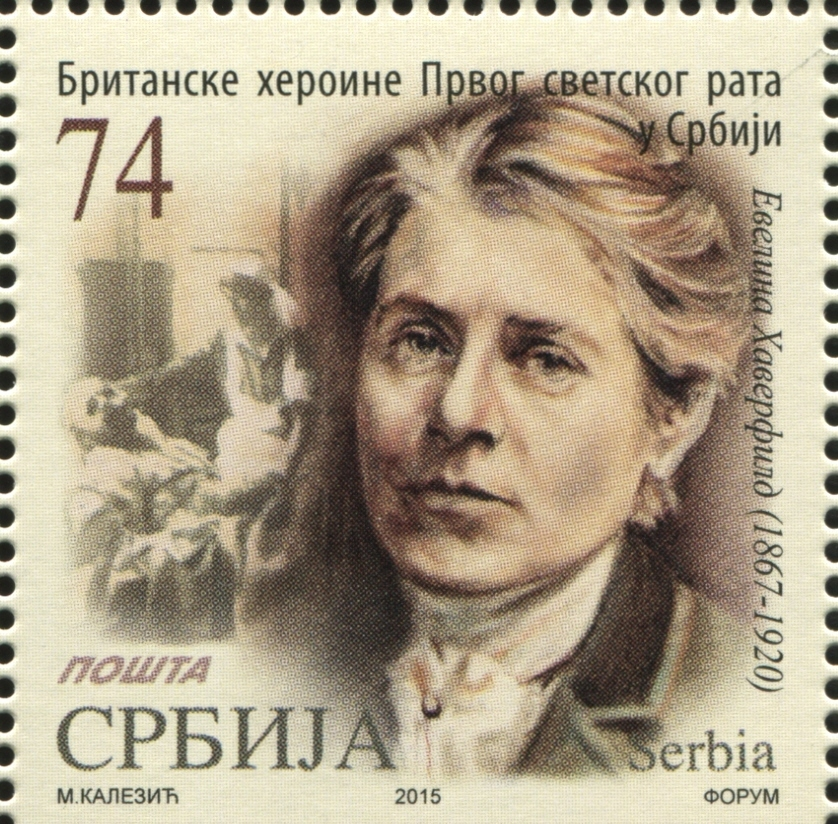
Haverfield on a 2015 Serbian stamp from the series "British Heroines of the First World War in Serbia".

Evelina Haverfield (née Scarlett; 9 August 1867 – 21 March 1920) was a British suffragette and aid worker.

In the early 20th century, she was involved in Emmeline Pankhurst's militant women's suffrage organisation the Women's Social and Political Union. During World War I she worked as a nurse in Serbia. After the war, she returned to Serbia with her companion Vera Holme to set up an orphanage in Bajina Bašta, a town in the west of the country.

== Early career ==
Evelina's birth is recorded as 'the Honourable Evilena Scarlett' (with her first name spelled thus) born on 9 August 1867 at Inverlochy Castle, Kingussie in Scotland. She was the third child of the 5 daughters and a son of William Scarlett, 3rd Baron Abinger, and his wife, Helen Magruder, the daughter of a U.S. Navy commodore. Her childhood was divided between London and the Inverlochy estate. In 1880 she went to school in Düsseldorf, Germany.

On 10 February 1887, at the age of 19, she married a Royal Artillery officer, Major Henry Wykeham Brooke Tunstall Haverfield RA (1846–1895), in Kensington, London, and the couple went to live at Sherborne, Dorset. From 1890 to 1893, they lived at West Hall, an Elizabethan manor house at Folke near Sherborne. In 1893, the couple moved to Marsh Court at a Dorset hamlet, Caundle Marsh. Evelina's husband was 20 years her senior. The marriage was a happy one producing two sons, John Campbell Haverfield (1887–1915) and Brook Tunstall Haverfield (1889–1954), but Henry Haverfield died eight years later.

Haverfield enjoyed a lifestyle not yet commonplace for women, for example, she rode a bicycle she called Pegasus. Cycling was embraced by the suffragists as it was vehicle for 'fresh air' and freedom. The sense of liberation was dynamic during the Great War, when mobility was at a high premium and engendered equality. On 19 July 1899, she married Major John Henry Balguy RA (1859–1933), from a Derbyshire gentry family, another Royal Artillery major, later a brigadier-general, later a Metropolitan Police magistrate, and an old army friend of her late husband. The ceremony took place in Caundle Marsh. The bride soon reverted to the name Haverfield and kept her home at Marsh Court in Sherborne. On her wedding day, she wrote in her diary: 'I married Major Balguy with no intention of changing my name or mode of life in any way. He is an old friend of my darling Jack.'

During the Second Boer War, she travelled to South Africa for two years to act as assistant to her husband who was stationed there. She enjoyed being involved in the military zone and even took part in rifle practice. While there she formed a retirement camp for horses. After ten years, the couple separated, but did not divorce.

Haverfield's friendship with Vera "Jack" Holme, who lived with her in Devon from 1911, may have been more like a marriage, as a year after moving in, Holme made Haverfield her sole heir (including leaving her a bed with 'E.H.&V.H.' carved on it). In 1921, Haverfield's own will was refuted by her husband; it was said their marriage was "an unsatisfactory union".

== Women's suffrage ==
Haverfield began to take an interest in politics and aligned herself with the moderate women's suffrage groups. In April 1909, Haverfield was a founder member with Mildred Mansel (1868–1942) of the Sherborne branch of the National Union of Women's Suffrage Societies.

In 1908, she attended a rally at the Royal Albert Hall and started supporting the militant suffragettes, joining the Women's Social and Political Union (WSPU). She took part in numerous protests and was arrested several times for obstructing and assaulting the police.

In 1909 Haverfield took part in the Bill of Rights March. Members of the WSPU, led by Emmeline Pankhurst, attempted to enter the House of Commons. They were blocked by the police and over 100 women were arrested, including Haverfield. Following a WSPU demonstration in 1910 she was arrested for assaulting a police officer after hitting him in the mouth. According to the charges brought against her, she had also said "It was not hard enough. Next time I will bring a revolver."

In 1911, she was among 200 women arrested in London for breaking windows and damaging government buildings during a public protest against the Manhood Suffrage bill. The Veto bill passing through the Commons was challenged several times by the Lords during efforts by the Liberal government to secure the provisions in their budgets in 1909 and 1910. The Parliament Act 1911 Haverfield's part in this particular protest had been to attempt to disrupt a police cordon by leading police horses out of their rank. In the same year Haverfield began a relationship with her fellow suffragette, the actress Vera Holme which lasted until Haverfield's death, although during 1919 Holme was living in Kirkcudbright where she had an affair with the artist Dorothy Johnstone.

With Alice Laura Embleton (a cancer scientist), Vera Holme, and Celia Wray, Haverfield set up the private 'Foosack League' between themselves. Its membership was restricted to women and suffragists; the internal evidence suggests the Foosack League was a lesbian secret society. Certainly, the four were close friends – as evidenced by the many letters written between them, particularly during World War I.

== World War I ==
When World War I broke out in 1914, Haverfield became concerned with how women could help in the event of an invasion of the UK and founded the Women's Emergency Corps. In 1915 she volunteered to go abroad with the Scottish Women's Hospitals, joining Elsie Inglis in Serbia, and Mary H. J. Henderson, fellow Scottish suffragist was the administrator of her unit, as they travelled through the chaotic Serbian retreat. In early 1916, they were forced to leave Serbia following the German invasion. Haverfield returned to the United Kingdom and gave press interviews about the situation in Serbia. In August, she travelled at Inglis' request to Dobrudja in Romania. With Flora Sandes she founded the Hon. Evelina Haverfield's and Sert-Major Flora Sandes's Fund for Promoting Comforts for Serbian Soldiers and Prisoners.

=== After the war ===
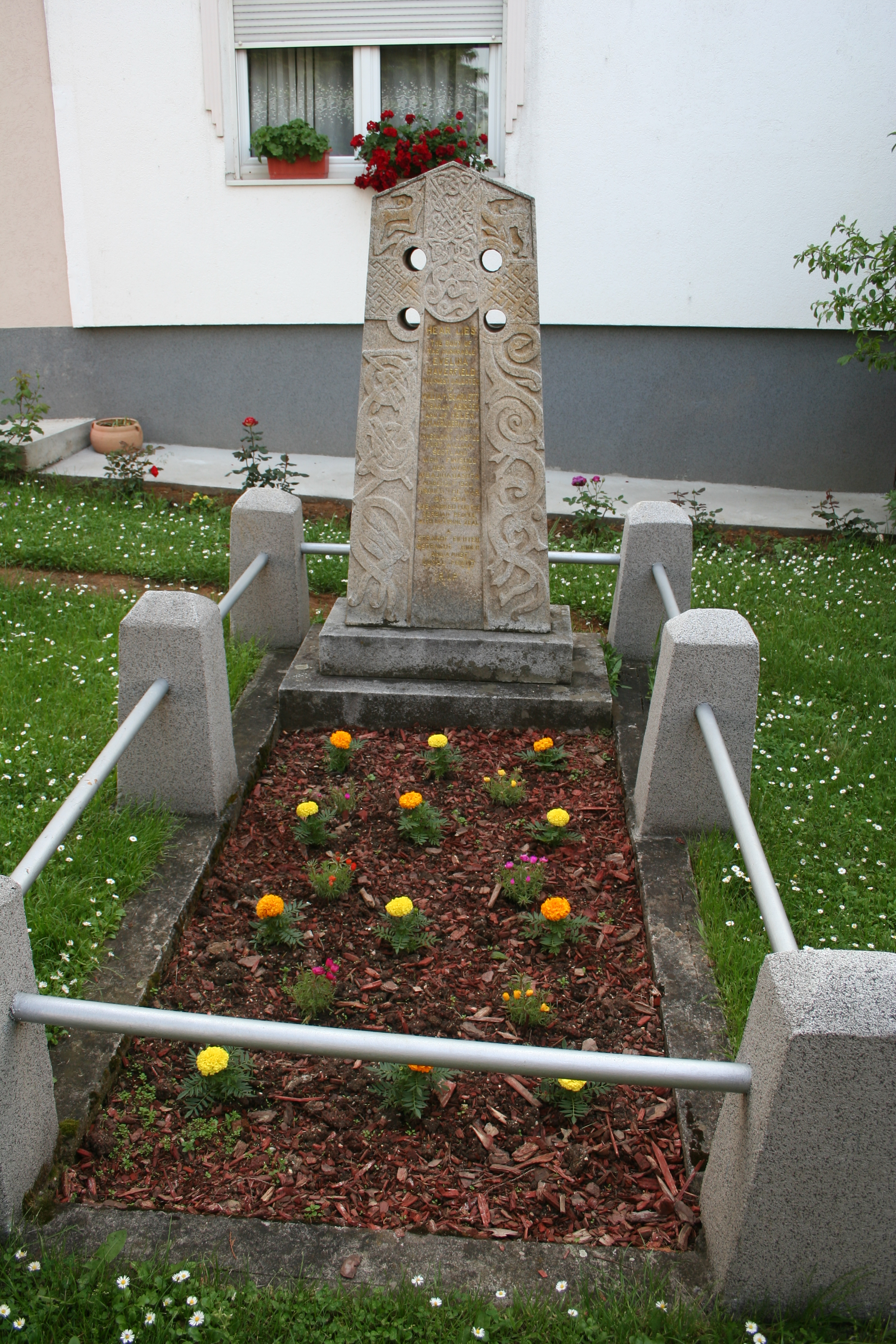
Grave of Evelina Haverfield at the cemetery of the Church of Saint Elijah

Following the end of the war, Evelina turned her attention to the orphaned Serbian children. She travelled to Serbia with Holme and helped to build a children's health centre in Bajina Bašta which was later named after her. She died of pneumonia on 21 March 1920, aged 52, and is buried in the cemetery at Church of Saint Elijah in Bajina Bašta. A memorial service was held for her at Southwark Cathedral on 1 May 1920. In 1923, a memorial tablet was installed in her memory at Bishop's Caundle church in Dorset beneath the memorial window Evelina had erected for her first husband. Vera Holme was left £50 a year for life by Haverfield despite the challenge from Haverfield's husband.

== See also ==
- History of the bicycle craze
- Elsie Inglis – Scottish doctor (1864–1917)
- People on Scottish banknotes
- Elsie Inglis Memorial Maternity Hospital
- Scottish Women's Hospitals for Foreign Service
- Elizabeth Ness MacBean Ross – Scottish physician (1878 - 1915)
- Leila Paget – British humanitarian
- Mabel St Clair Stobart – British suffragist and aid-worker
- Josephine Bedford – Australian philanthropist and WWI ambulance driver (1861-1955)
- Katherine Harley – British suffragist
- Isabel Emslie Hutton – Scottish physician (1887–1960)

Political offices
Preceded by Sybil Thomas	Honorary Treasurer of the East London Federation of Suffragettes; 1914	Succeeded by Edgar Lansbury
