= Church of Saint Elijah, Bajina Bašta =

Church of Saint Elijah
- Црква светог Илије
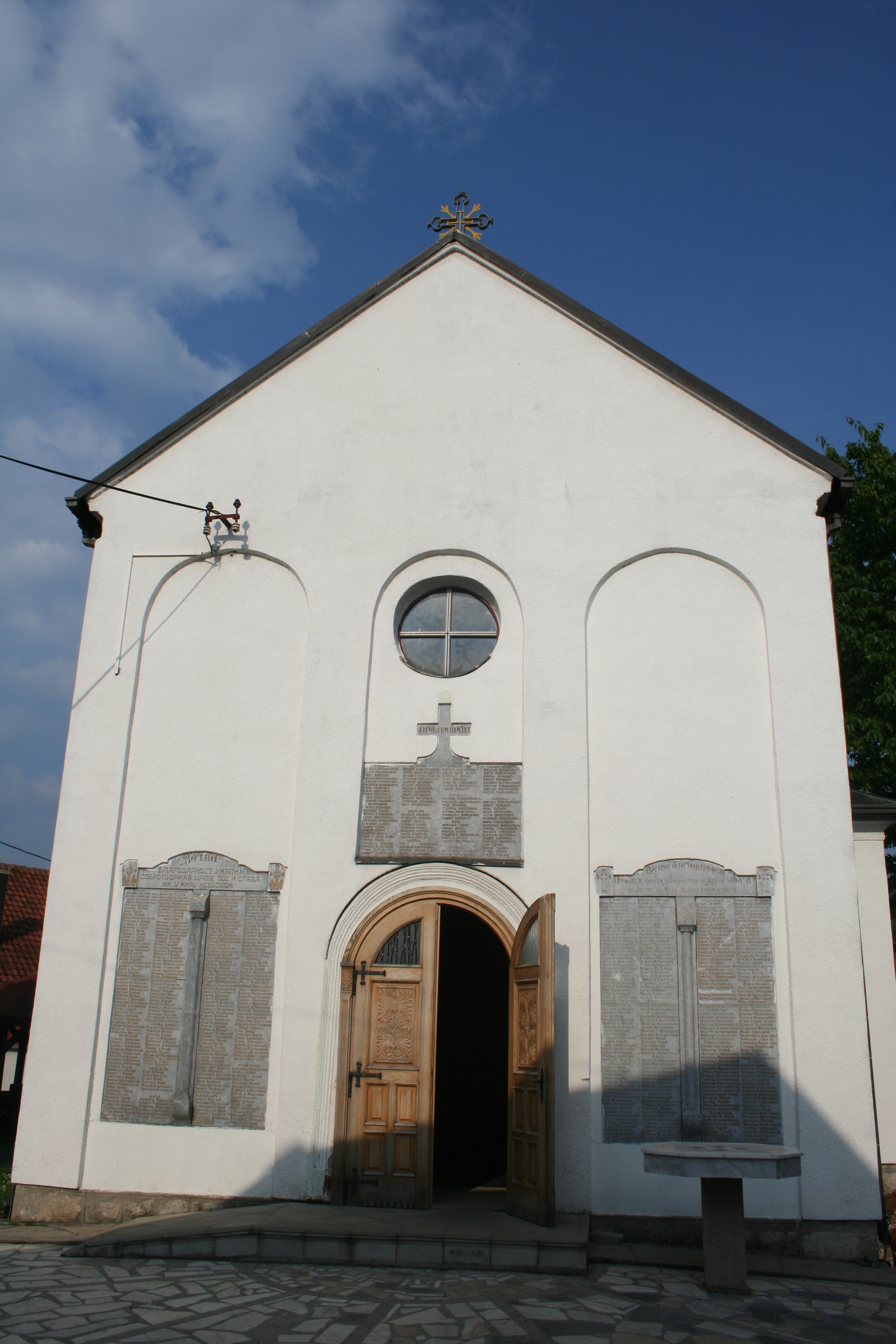
- Church of Saint Elijah
- Church of Saint Elijah
- 43°58′05″N 19°34′01″E
- Country: Serbia
- Denomination: Serbian Orthodox

History
- Dedication: Saint Elijah

Architecture
- Completed: 1892-1893

Administration
- Archdiocese: Eparchy of Žiča

The Church of Saint Elijah (Serbian: Црква светог Илије) is a Serbian Orthodox church located in Bajina Bašta, Serbia. Dedicated to Saint Elijah, it was constructed in 1893. The church cemetery is the burial place of Evelina Haverfield, British suffragette and aid worker who in 1915, during World War I in Serbia, volunteered as a member of the Scottish Women's Hospitals.

== History ==
The church was constructed between 1892 and 1893. The first liturgy was held on January 1, 1894 (according to the old Julian calendar), and the church was consecrated on July 19 of the same year, on the eve of its patronal feast day. The church was built through voluntary contributions, with the Rača Monastery as the largest donor. Significant support also came from local priest Luka Popović and member of Parliament of Serbia Radisav Mitrović.

The church was visited by Serbian monarchs Milan I of Serbia and King Alexander I of Serbia in 1899 and Peter I of Serbia with Crown Prince George and Prince Alexander (later Alexander I of Yugoslavia) in 1905. In 1938, Bishop Nikolaj Velimirović consecrated the church bell tower. It was repainted in 1993, and in 1995, a carved walnut iconostasis was installed. In 1999, the church gate and candle shop were reconstructed and expanded.

== See also ==
- Eparchy of Žiča
