= Aileen Preston =

Irish chauffeur and suffragette (1889–1974)

- Born: 1889; County Armagh, Ireland
- Died: 1974 (aged 84–85); Northallerton, Yorkshire, England
- Occupation: Chauffeur for the Women's Social and Political Union
- Organization: Voluntary Aid Detachment
- Known for: Driving Emmeline Pankhurst, being the first woman in history to qualify for the Automobile Association Certificate in Driving, and being head of the first autonomous British women’s ambulance unit in France
- Movement: Suffragettes
- Spouse: John Graham-Jones
- Children: 2

Aileen Preston (1889–1974) was an Irish chauffeur and suffragette. She was chauffeur to suffragette leader Emmeline Pankhurst and was the first woman in history to qualify for the Automobile Association Certificate in Driving. During World War I, she became the head of the first autonomous British women's ambulance unit.

== Early life and education ==
Aileen Chevallier Preston was born in 1889 in County Armagh, Ireland. She was one of six children of Edith (née Chevallier) and John Preston, although three siblings had died before 1905. Her father had served as a captain in the 4th Royal Irish Rifles and latterly as resident magistrate in Athlone, County Westmeath. Her mother won sporting prizes in croquet in both Ireland and England. Preston's maternal family, the Chevalliers, were based at Aspall Hall in Debenham, Suffolk. Her father died in 1907, and the surviving family members moved to live in Richmond. Her mother completed the household's 1911 census return by writing ‘Unenfranchised’ in the ‘Infirmity’ column for all the women in the house, family and servants.

By 1914, Preston's brother was in training to be a civil engineer, and she was also interested in machinery, so she joined a motor works to learn how the internal combustion engine worked and how to maintain a vehicle. She did this before learning to drive, going on to becoming the first woman to gain her Certificate in Driving, the first woman to do so.

== Career ==
Preston put an advertisement in the classified columns of the Morning Post and Votes for Women newspapers, looking for work as a ‘Lady Chaffeuse’ and qualified motor mechanic. The secretary of Emmeline Pankhurst, the leader of the suffragette movement, thought to be Mabel Tuke, contacted her for an interview. Preston was appointed as Pankhurst's chauffeur in April 1911, and was paid £1 a week. Her family thought she was going "straight into the dark arms of Hell" as the driver for "that dreadful woman", but she loved the job.

Preston drove Pankhurst in a large Wolseley car that had been donated to the Women's Social and Political Union (WSPU) by the heiress Mary Dodge. Motor cars were still quite new and a risky method of travel, and during a single journey through the Lake District she had to fix five tyre punctures. The car was also under Police surveillance.

Preston was succeeded as the driver for Mrs Pankhurst by Vera Holme. In 1913, Preston set up the first driving school for women in London at St Mary Abbott's Place, Kensington. She encouraged women who wished to drive themselves, and those who were interested in a career as a chauffeur. The business was successful enough that she took on Miss Carver as a partner and advertised regularly in Votes for Women and Common Cause until the outbreak of the First World War.

During the First World War, Preston joined the Voluntary Aid Detachment's Watson Unit. In 1916, she became the head of the first autonomous British women's ambulance unit. This was based at a field hospital in northern France. She led 13 women drivers and was mentioned in despatches for her work there.

== Personal life ==
Preston married army doctor John Graham-Jones in 1915, and they had two children – a daughter Gundreda Margaret in July 1917 and a son Michael John in 1920.

Preston died in Dorset in 1974.
