= William Scarlett, 3rd Baron Abinger =

Lieutenant-General The Right Honourable The Lord Abinger CB DL
- Photograph of Abinger, c. 1865
- Born: William Frederick Scarlett; 30 August 1826; Abinger, England
- Died: 16 January 1892 (aged 65); Fort William, Scotland
- Spouse: Helen Magruder (m. 1863)
- Children: 3, including James, Ella, and Evelina
- Relatives: Robert Scarlett (father); James Yorke Scarlett (uncle); Peter Campbell Scarlett (uncle); William Anglin Scarlett (great-uncle); James Scarlett (grandfather)
- Military career
- Allegiance: United Kingdom
- Branch: British Army
- Rank: Lieutenant-General
- Conflicts: Crimean War: Battle of Alma; Battle of Balaclava; Battle of Inkerman
- Awards: Companion of the Order of the Bath

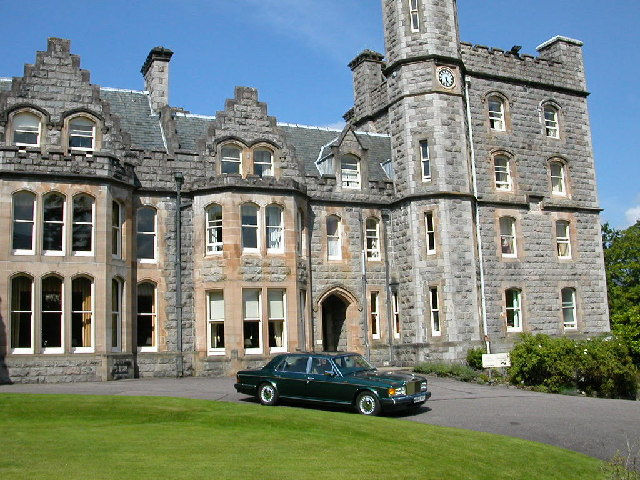
The building today known as Inverlochy Castle Hotel was listed as Scarlett's main home at the time of admission into university.

Lieutenant-General William Frederick Scarlett, 3rd Baron Abinger, CB, DL (30 August 1826 – 16 January 1892) was a British peer and soldier.

== Education ==
Lord Abinger was educated at Eton College and Trinity College, Cambridge.

== Military career ==
He became a captain of the Scots Fusilier Guards regiment of the British Army. He served in the Crimean War fighting between 1854 and 1855 in the battles of Alma, Balaclava and Inkerman.

Scarlett succeeded his father Robert Scarlett, 2nd Baron Abinger, in 1861. He visited the United States during the American Civil War He was promoted to major in 1868, with promotions through the ranks at intervals of six, three and five years.

In the 1877 Birthday Honours, Lord Abinger was appointed to the Order of the Bath as a Companion (CB).

== Family ==
In 1863, he married Helen Magruder, daughter of Commodore George Allan Magruder, of the United States Navy, and niece of John B. Magruder. They had one son, James and two daughters, Ella, who studied medicine at London School of Medicine for Women and the Royal Free Hospital and became the first female doctor in the state of Bloemfontein, South Africa, and Evelina, an activist for women's suffrage and an aid worker during World War I, who married Major Henry Haverfield.

One of the two main family estates at this time (the other being the house that is today Inverlochy Castle Hotel) was Abinger Hall, at the foot of the North Downs in Abinger, Surrey. The third baron sold it in 1867 to a Mr Gwynne, who soon thereafter sold it to become the family seat of the statistician recently created first Lord Farrer, who rebuilt the house on that land.

Scarlett's first cousin once removed (downward), James Williams Scarlett, son of Sir William Anglin Scarlett, purchased the isle of Gigha, off the coast of Argyll, for £49,000 in 1865. His son, Lieutenant-Colonel William James Scarlett, then built the mansion house of Achamore there. Gigha remained in the family's hands until 1919.

== Bibliography ==
- Haswell-Smith, Hamish (2004). The Scottish Islands. Edinburgh: Canongate. ISBN 978-1-84195-454-7.
- Williamson, David (1995). "William Scarlett, 3rd Baron Abinger". Debrett's Peerage & Baronetage. London: Debrett's Peerage Ltd.

Peerage of the United Kingdom
Preceded by Robert Scarlett	Baron Abinger; 1861–1892	Succeeded by James Scarlett
