= Celia Wray =

English suffragette and architect (1872–1954)

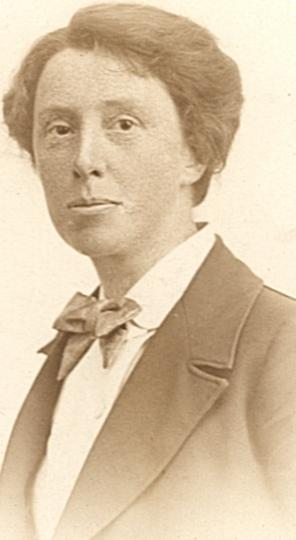
- Wray in 1914
- Born: 30 May 1872; Barnsley, Yorkshire, England
- Died: 30 November 1954 (aged 82); Blythburgh, Suffolk, England
- Organization(s): Women's Emancipation Union; Barnsley Women's Suffrage Society

Celia Wray (30 May 1872 – 30 November 1954) was an English suffragette and architect.

== Early life ==
She was born in Barnsley, Yorkshire in 1872 as Cecilia Wray, the daughter of Jane Burrows née Batty (1846–1910) and Charles Wray (1844–1931), a pork butcher who was Mayor of Barnsley from 1896–1897 and again in 1903–1904. He had built up an "extensive business" in Barnsley where he was a Liberal councillor for the west ward of Barnsley from 1889, and retired as alderman in 1924. He was president of the District Butchers' Association and was a supporter of Blucher Street United Methodist Church and of the Tradesmen's Benevolent Institution. He was made Freeman of the Borough in 1921, before his retirement.

== Activism ==
For a period, Wray was an architect in Barnsley where in 1908 she designed some cottages in Cudworth which are still standing. In about 1896, she was a supporter of the Women's Emancipation Union. She was also a prominent activist for women's suffrage being a leading member of the Barnsley Women's Suffrage Society (founded in 1902), of which she was Secretary from 1908 to 1920, when she left the town in October.

Wray was in a relationship with cancer scientist Alice Laura Embleton (1876–1960). The two of them were photographed with other suffragettes protesting outside the offices of the Barnsley Chronicle in January 1910. In 1911 Wray was living with her father in Barnsley when on the day of the 1911 census Embleton was a visitor. In common with many other suffragettes, the two women defaced the census paper by writing the slogan "Getting votes for those who pay the piper. Getting votes for women" across it.

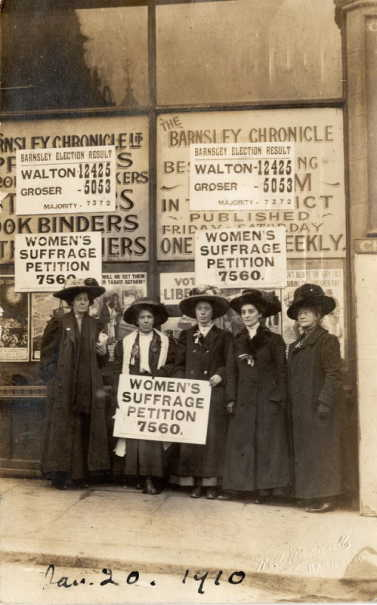
Alice Laura Embleton, Miss O Royston, Celia Wray, Miss M Fielden and Miss E Ford protesting outside the offices of the Barnsley Chronicle on 20 January 1910

With Embleton, Evelina Haverfield and Vera Holme, Wray set up the private 'Foosack League' between themselves the membership of which was restricted to women and suffragists; the internal evidence suggests the Foosack League was a lesbian secret society. Certainly, the four were close friends as evidenced by the many letters written between them, particularly during World War I.

In her later years, Wary lived with Alice Embleton at The Elms in Saxmundham in Suffolk. In her will she left £35,233 16s 5d.

Wray died in Blythburgh, Suffolk in 1954, aged 82.
