= Alice Embleton =

Biologist, zoologist, and suffragist

- Born: 1876; Epsom, Surrey, England
- Died: 1960 (aged 83–84)
- Education: Sutton High School for Girls; University College of South Wales and Monmouthshire
- Organization: Linnean Society of London

Alice Laura Embleton (1876 – 1960) was one of the first women to study sciences at the University College of South Wales and Monmouthshire, and among the first group of women to be appointed Fellows of the Linnean Society of London in 1905. A biologist and zoologist, Embleton developed work on pesticides to improve crop production. She was also a noted suffragist.

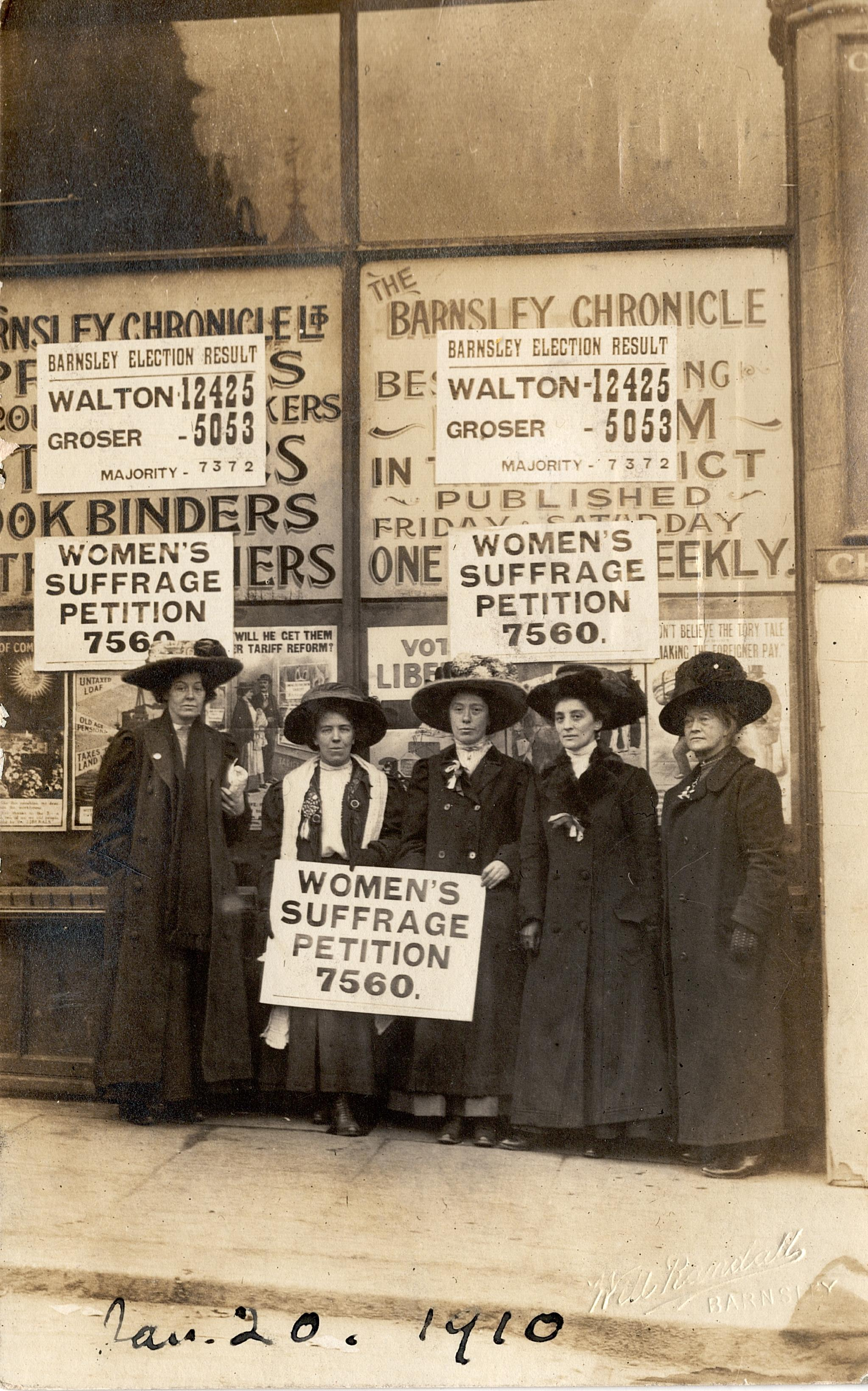
Alice Embleton pictured with suffragists in Barnsley, 1910

== Education and early life ==
Embleton was born in Epsom, Surrey, and attended Sutton High School for Girls. She enrolled at the University College of South Wales and Monmouthshire, now Cardiff University, in 1895, and graduated in 1899 with a Baccalaureus Scientia, first class.

== Career and research ==
In 1900, she won the 1851 Exhibition Memorial Scholarship, which annually awards a three-year research scholarship to '"young scientists or engineers of exceptional promise".

She used the £150 scholarship to work at the Balfour Laboratory at Newnham College, Cambridge, followed by a further period of study at the Sorbonne in Paris. She is considered the second woman to publish on the topic of copepodology, after Edith Mary Pratt.

In 1903, she was appointed honorary zoologist to the Board of Agriculture, and won the Royal Society's Mackinnon studentship for research into Biological Sciences.

She was one of the first woman to speak at the Linnean Society, Burlington House, London. Her paper, delivered on 4 June 1903, was entitled: "Anatomy and Development of a Hymeropterous Parasite of a Scaly Insect (Lecanium Hemisphoericum)". Among with fifteen other women, she was made a Fellow of the Linnean Society in 1905. The Linnean Society archives hold Embleton's correspondence with the Society, of which she remained a Fellow until 1917.

In 1906 she co-published the papers, "On the synapsis in amphibia" and "On the origin of the sertoli".

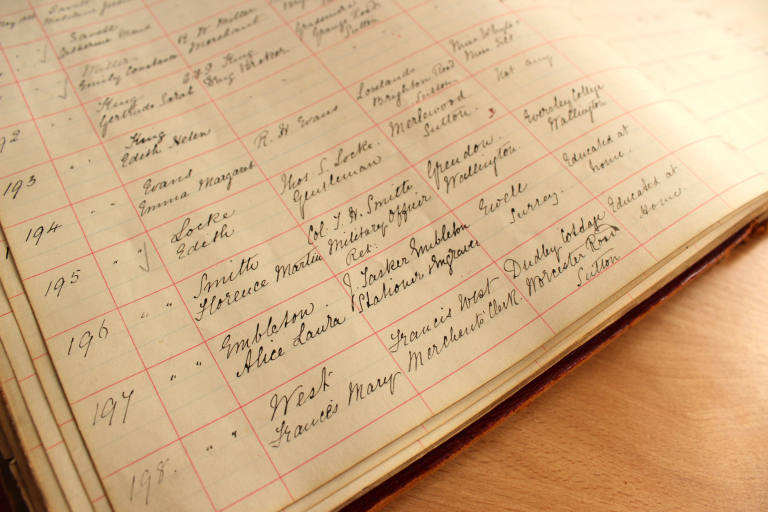
Alice Embleton's entry in Sutton High School's admissions register

In later life she conducted cancer research at the Royal College of Science in South Kensington.

== Personal and non-academic life ==
Embleton was connected with a number of noted suffragists, including Evelina Haverfield, Vera Holme, and Celia Wray. The 1911 census shows that Embleton was visiting Wray at Fairfield House, Barnsley on the day of the census. Like many suffragists, the two women defaced the census paper by recording their occupation as "Getting votes for women".

The four women set up the private 'Foosack League' between themselves, the membership of which was restricted to women and suffragists. Evidence suggests the Foosack League was a lesbian secret society. The Women's Library holds correspondence between the women during World War I, in which Embleton is referred to as 'Alick', and Wray as 'Mr Wary'.

In her later years, Embleton lived with Wray at The Elms in Saxmundham in Suffolk.

== See also ==
- Timeline of women in science
