= Vera Holme =

British actress and suffragette

Jack Holme
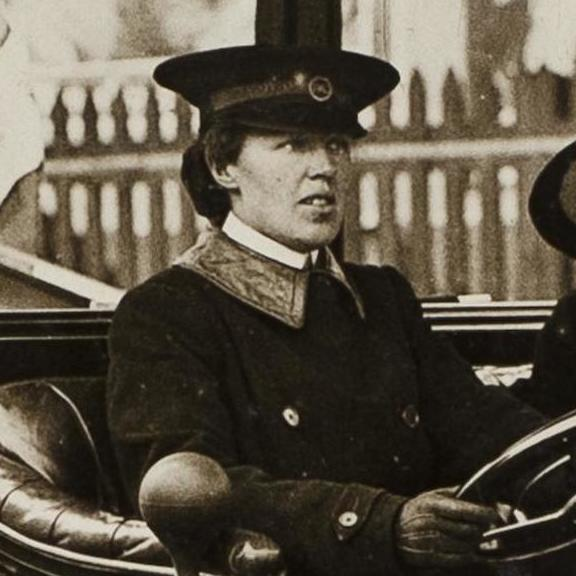
- Vera "Jack" Holme as WSPU chauffeur
- Born: Vera Louise Holme; 29 August 1881; Birkdale, Southport, Lancashire, England
- Died: 1 January 1969 (aged 87); Glasgow, Scotland
- Occupations: Actress, chauffeur, administrator
- Known for: Cross dressing and being "the Pankhursts' chauffeur"
- Partner: Evelina Haverfield (d. 1920)

Vera Louise Holme, also known as Jack Holme (29 August 1881 – 1 January 1969), was a British actress and a suffragette. Born in Lancashire, she began working as a touring male impersonator when her parents could no longer support her. A talented violinist and singer, she also was a member of the chorus of the D'Oyly Carte Opera Company and later became a member of the Pioneer Players. After joining the Actresses' Franchise League, she became involved in the women's suffrage movement. She became the Pankhursts' chauffeur and the first professional woman driver in London.

With the outbreak of World War I Holme joined her partner Evelina Haverfield in the Women's Volunteer Reserve. In 1915 they went to Serbia with the Scottish Women's Hospitals for Foreign Service (SWH) as an ambulance driver and head of their transport services. When the Central Powers invaded Serbia, she and Haverfield refused evacuation to stay with their patients. They were arrested and held as prisoners of war for several months, but after they were released, they returned to work in SWH units in Romania and Russia. At the end of the war, she was honoured with medals by both Russia and Serbia, and returned to Serbia where she helped establish and run an orphanage from 1919 to 1922.

In 1923, Holme returned to Britain and began to perform again, moving to Scotland with two fellow veterans of the SWH. She and her ménage à trois partners, Margaret Greenlees and Margaret Ker, lived together in a home in Lochearnhead, until Ker moved out in 1939. Holme became a speaker and lecturer for the Women's Rural Institutes and also managed and produced plays in the region. She remained in a relationship with Greenlees until the latter died in 1952.

Holme died in Glasgow in 1969. Her archive is held by the Women's Library at the London School of Economics. Having continued correspondence for many years with her colleagues from the SWH, her papers give evidence of and insight into lesbian lives in the interwar period in both Britain and Serbia.

== Early life ==
Holme was born on 29 August 1881 in Birkdale, Lancashire, England. Her parents were Mary Louisa (née Crowe) and Richard Holme. Her father was a middle class timber merchant. Most of Holme's youth was spent in Lancashire, but she attended a convent school abroad, likely in France. She was close to her brother Gordon, who later named his son and daughter Jack and Vera in her honour. Her parents separated when she was a teenager and her mother remarried. Her father periodically gave her an allowance, but because she had no regular income, Holme an accomplished singer and violinist, took work as an artist's model, singer, and actor.

== Stage career ==
Holme decided on acting because of her admiration for actress Ellen Terry and her daughter Edith Craig. Actresses in the Victorian Age had been strictly confined to roles reinforcing binary gender presentations to uphold moral norms. By the turn of the century however, theatres and the public began to recognise a separation between actors and their roles, opening up the potential for actors to impersonate other genders. In 1903, Holme signed a contract earning the significant sum of £25 per week to work as a male impersonator. It is widely thought that her nickname "Jack" came from one of her stage characters of this time. She toured with travelling theatrical companies for several years and had no permanent address.

Holme became a member of the women's chorus in the D'Oyly Carte Opera Company's Gilbert and Sullivan London Repertory Seasons at the Savoy Theatre in London, performing each season between 1906 and 1909. As a chorus member, she performed in elaborate gowns. Expanded acting roles for women eventually led to a push for wider socio-political reforms as women began to participate in previously considered male occupations, such as working as playwrights and theatre managers. In 1907, the Actresses' Franchise League was formed as a networking organisation to press for the rights of women involved in all aspects of theatre work, including women's suffrage. Holme joined the league in 1908 and began singing with suffragettes outside Holloway Prison to support women who had been arrested and locked up for suffrage protests. In 1909, she rode as a mounted officer at the Hyde Park demonstration and appeared in the Pageant of Great Women by Cicely Hamilton as Hannah Snell, a woman who had disguised her gender to become a soldier.

Holme joined the Pioneer Players, formed by Craig in 1911, performing until 1915. From this time, Holme transitioned to using Jack as her identification, although it was not a strict adherence. Scholar Twisha Singh, stated that it was not a "life-altering event", but rather a means for her to subvert cultural conventions. Photographs indicate that Holme began to adopt masculine dress and habits. After the war, she returned to theatre work, and between 1917 and 1920, was affiliated with the Pioneer Players again. When she moved to Lochearnhead, Scotland, in 1923, she continued to perform as a male, touring with theatrical companies. She also managed and produced plays and dramas. An article in the Perthshire Advertiser in 1938, entitled "Notable Lochearnhead Lady", recognised both her regional theatre work and friendship with Craig.

== Women's suffrage ==
Holme, who Sylvia Pankhurst described as "a noisy, explosive young person, frequently rebuked by her elders for lack of dignity" became involved in the militant suffrage campaigning group the Women's Social and Political Union (WSPU). The WSPU staged controversial actions, preferring extremist challenges to create societal change. One such escapade involving Holme was when she hid in the large organ at Colston Hall, Bristol in May 1909. She waited there overnight with Elsie Howey with the objective of shouting "Votes for Women" at a political address by Liberal Party MP Augustine Birrell the next day. Their actions were commemorated in a poem, "An Organ Record", written by Holme and published in that month's issue of Votes for Women. By the end of the year, Pankhurst had changed her opinion of Holme, and in August 1909 she became the official chauffeur of the leaders of the WSPU, Emmeline Pankhurst and Emmeline Pethick-Lawrence, sporting a uniform and a short hair style. She succeeded Aileen Preston. She was featured in the trade journal The Chauffeur in 1911, which praised her mechanical and driving skill, which brought her to international attention. Newspapers dubbed her the "only liveried girl chauffeur in London".

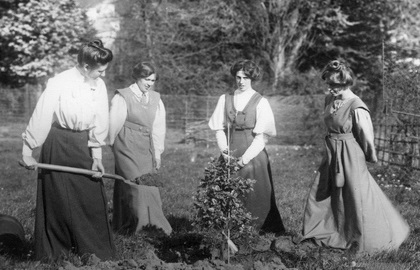
A 1909 photograph recording Holme planting a tree with Mary Blathwayt, Jessie Kenney and Annie Kenney

An accomplished horsewoman, Holme often rode astride when leading suffrage parades. In 1910, she led one such parade in London with Flora Drummond and Evelina Haverfield. Haverfield was married to a wealthy baron, but the two women became close friends. In 1910, Holme and Haverfield, along with scientist Alice Laura Embleton, known as Alick, and her partner Celia Wray, set up the private Foosack League between themselves. The membership was restricted to women and suffragists; the internal evidence suggests the Foosack League was a lesbian secret society. Becoming close friends, Holme wrote letters to Embleton and Wray, particularly during World War I.

Haverfield and Holme began living together in Devon in 1911 and would remain partners until Haverfield's death in 1920. On 22 November 1911, Holme was arrested for stone throwing and obstructing the police. She was imprisoned for five days in Holloway Prison, where she made sketches of her cell and confinement. Since 1909, Linley and Mary Blathwayt had invited suffragettes, who had been imprisoned on behalf of the cause, to plant trees in the arboretum adjoining Eagle House, their home in Batheaston. Holme joined others in planting a tree there. When Britain entered the war, all of the women involved in striving for the vote, temporarily changed their focus to the war effort. They believed that their support and participation would prove their worth as citizens.

== First World War work ==
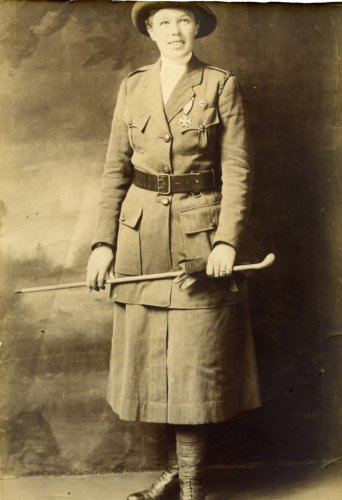
Holme in Scottish Women's Hospitals Unit uniform, about 1916

At the start of the war in 1914, Holme joined Haverfield's Women's Volunteer Reserve (WVR), as a major of the 1st London Battalion, of the WVR. When Haverfield joined the Scottish Women's Hospitals for Foreign Service (SWH) as its administrator, she recruited her partner Holme to organise the ambulance and transport services. Holme served as an ambulance driver and oversaw both the motorised and horsedriven vehicles. They arrived in the Kingdom of Serbia in the spring of 1915, and made friendships with local military doctors and officers. When the Central Powers invaded Serbia at the end of the year, most of the SWH personnel were evacuated, but Holme and Haverfield refused to leave their wounded patients. They were evacuated with their patients to Kruševac, and worked under German authority, treating patients at a makeshift hospital, while guarding the Red Cross supply stores from looters.

Holme and Haverfield were captured in November 1915 and held as prisoners of war in Austria until February 1916, when the American Red Cross successfully negotiated their release. Upon gaining their freedom, the couple went to another SWH unit in Dobruja, Romania, where they met Alexandrina Onslow. Throughout 1916 and 1917, Holme drove an ambulance in both Romania and Russia. In 1917 Holme was sent back to England to carry a personal message from Dr Elsie Inglis to Lord Derby, the Secretary of State for War. Arriving back in England, Holme went on a lecture tour, to raise money for the SWH. In 1918, in recognition of her work with the SWH, Holme was awarded the Samaritan Cross by the King of Serbia, and a medal for Meritorious Service by Russia.

== Post War ==
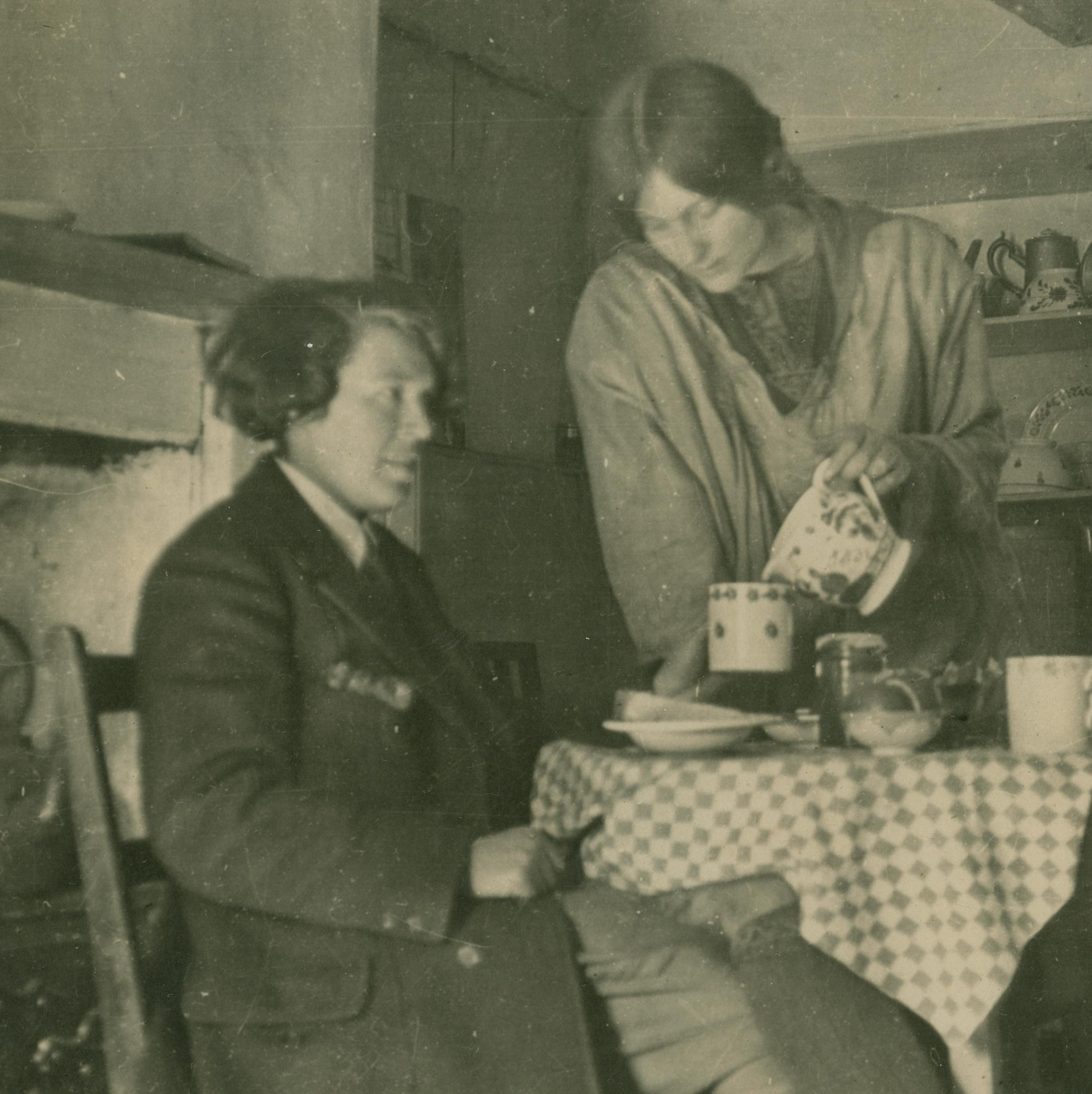
Vera "Jack" Holme and Dorothy Johnstone in 1918

In 1918, Haverfield returned to Serbia to set up an orphanage in Bajina Basta, established through the Haverfield Fund for Serbian Children. At the time, Holme was living in Kirkcudbright, and having an affair with the artist Dorothy Johnstone. They lived in an artists' colony founded in 1915 by Jessie M. King and her husband E. A. Taylor, along with other artists, like Anne Finlay, Anna Hotchkis, Cecile Walton, and other women artists from Edinburgh and Glasgow.

Holme joined Haverfield in Serbia in 1919, and before creating the new orphanage, they reorganised an existing orphan's facility in Užice. Once that was completed, they founded the orphanage at Bajina Basta. There they were joined by other veterans of the SWH, Onslow, Margaret Greenlees, and Margaret Ker. Haverfield died of pneumonia in 1920, and left Holme an inheritance of £50-year for life. Holme, Onslow, Greenlees, and Ker took in and raised sixty orphans. Despite deplorable conditions and a lack of food, they remained in Bajina Basta until 1922. Holme maintained links with Serbia after Haverfield's death in 1920, exchanging letters for decades with Onslow and Rojc. It is likely she visited the couple in Zagreb when she returned to Serbia in the 1930s.

== Return to Scotland ==
In 1923, Holme moved back to Scotland with Greenlees and Ker, and Onslow moved to Zagreb with her partner, the Croatian painter Nasta Rojc. The ménage à trois partners lived together in Tigh-na-Crich, Lochearnhead, until Ker moved out in 1939. They lived in a house they named Allt Grianach (Sunny Burn), located on Glen Ogle. Holme was a frequent speaker and lecturer for the Women's Rural Institutes, which she, Greenlees and Ker all supported from its creation around 1923.

In the 1930s, Holme performed in Cecily Hamilton and Chris St John's play How the Vote Was Won, as the feminist character Georgina. She performed at the Barn Theatre in Small Hythe, where memorial productions were given annually for Ellen Terry by Craig. The Barn Theatre also feted Holme on her birthday in 1935 and 1936. She and Craig maintained a lifelong friendship, and her threesome spent time with Craig and her ménage à trois partners Christabel Marshall and Clare Atwood. In 1941, Holme broadcast a memorial talk in honour of Elsie Inglis on the BBC Home Service. After Ker's departure, Holme and Greenlees were a couple until Greenlees died in 1952.

== Death and legacy ==
Holme died on 1 January 1969 in Glasgow from arteriosclerosis and kidney failure. Her archive is held at the Women's Library at the LSE, which contains both her papers and a large collection of photographs. Her correspondence with Rojc and the women of the SWH, which took place over decades, provides tangible proof of queer history in both Serbia and Britain and has offered scholars clues to historic terminology and codes used by lesbians in their relationships. Scholars Catherine Baker and Olga Dimitrijević said that analysing the letters also has the potential to change what is known about British lesbians and their circles in the interwar period. Johnstone painted Holme's likeness in two oil paintings and one black and white chalk image. One of the oils Lady in Black with Tulips (1919) is in a collection in Australia.
