= Ella Campbell Scarlett =

English physician (1864–1937)

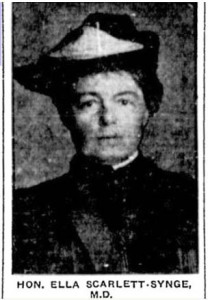
- Ella Scarlett in 1916
- Born: 22 November 1864; Abinger Hall, England
- Died: 30 October 1937 (aged 72); London, England
- Education: London School of Medicine for Women and the Royal Free Hospital
- Occupation: Physician
- Spouse: Percy Hamilton Synge (m. 14 December 1901-1921; divorced)
- Parent(s): Helen Magruder (mother); William Scarlett, 3rd Baron Abinger (father)
- Relatives: James Scarlett, 4th Baron Abinger (brother); Evelina Haverfield (sister); Robert Scarlett (grandfather); James Scarlett (great-grandfather)

Ella Campbell Scarlett (22 November 1864 – 30 October 1937) was an English physician who was the first woman medical practitioner in Bloemfontein, South Africa and the first woman doctor at the Royal Columbian Hospital in Canada.

== Early life and education ==
Scarlett was born at Abinger Hall in Surrey, on 22 November 1864, to Helen (née Magruder) Scarlett, niece of John B. Magruder, and William Scarlett, 3rd Baron Abinger.

In 1897, Scarlett studied medicine at the London School of Medicine for Women and the Royal Free Hospital for five years, and spent some time in Korea at the Royal Court.

On 14 December 1901, she married Percy Hamilton Synge. At the time of the wedding she was 37 years old and Synge was 29 years old.

== Career ==
In 1902, Scarlett traveled to Norvalspont, Cape Colony to serve, by government appointment, in the concentration camp as part of the Second Boer War. She then moved to Bloemfontein, where she was part of a six-member committee appointed by the British Minister of War to investigate conditions in the concentration camps. Other members of the committee included Millicent Fawcett and Jane Elizabeth Waterston. In 1903, Scarlett was assigned the position of doctor to Normal College and the Dames Instituut.

In 1907, Scarlett moved to Edmonton, Canada, for five years before moving to New Westminster. In 1915 Scarlett worked for the Canadian Red Cross teaching first aid and home nursing, as well as organising the first Women's Volunteer Reserve Corps of Canada and becoming the first woman doctor at the Royal Columbian Hospital. In August 1915, Scarlett traveled to Serbia to distribute medical supplies and visited British prisoner of war camps in Germany. She died on 30 October 1937, aged 72, in London.
