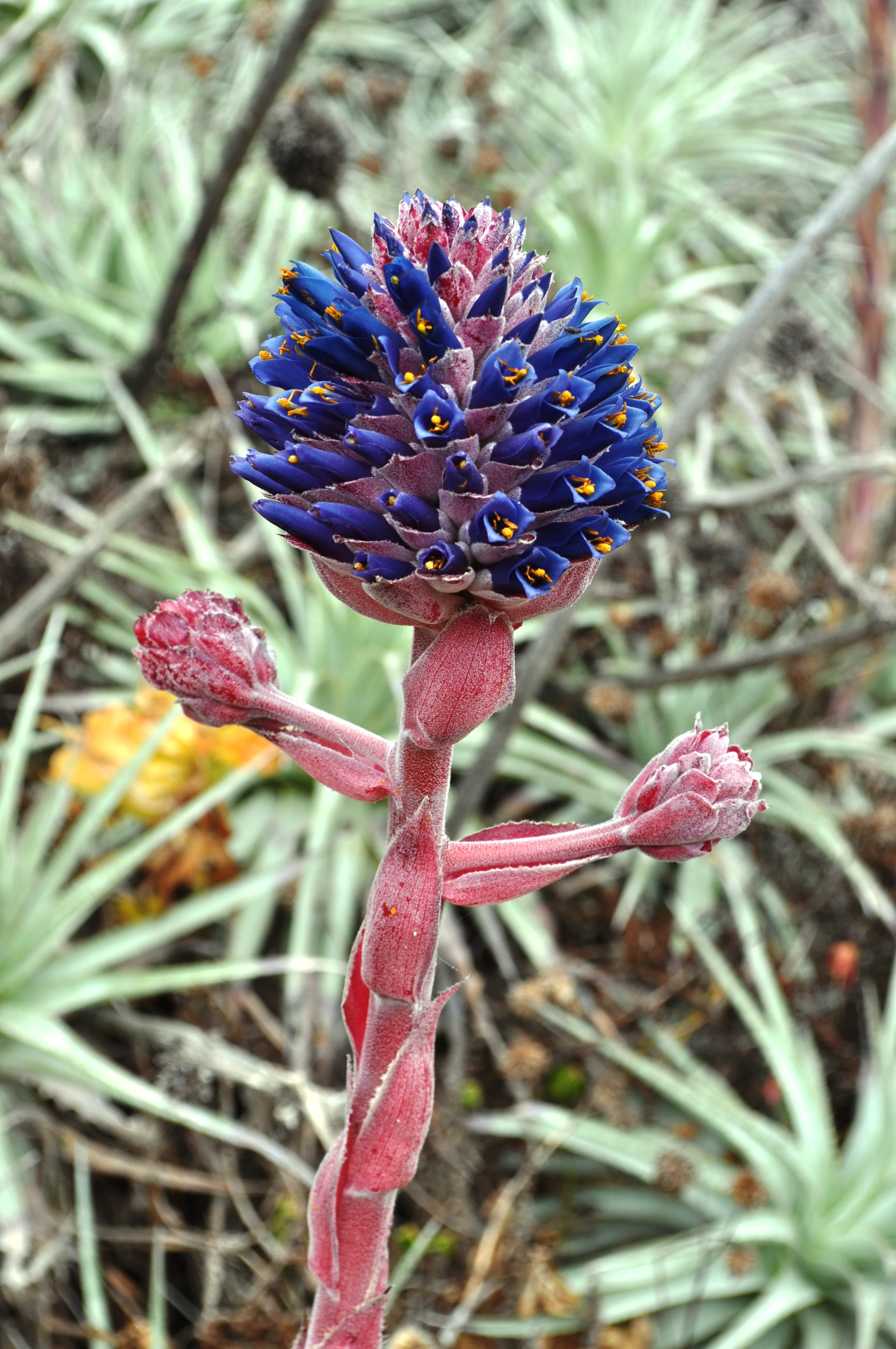

Scientific classification
- Kingdom: Plantae
- Clade: Embryophytes
- Clade: Tracheophytes
- Clade: Spermatophytes
- Clade: Angiosperms
- Clade: Monocots
- Clade: Commelinids
- Order: Poales
- Family: Bromeliaceae
- Genus: Puya
- Species: P. venusta

Binomial name
- Puya venusta (Baker) Phil.

Synonyms
- Pitcairnia sphaerocephala Baker; Pitcairnia venusta Baker; Puya coquimbensis Mez; Puya gaudichaudii Mez

= Puya venusta =

Species of plant

Puya venusta is a species of flowering plant in the family Bromeliaceae. This species is a rare plant endemic to certain areas of Chile including Punta Teatinos and Cerro La Campana. In La Campana National Park, P. venusta is associated with the endangered Chilean Wine Palm, Jubaea chilensis, a palm that prehistorically had a significantly wider distribution.

== Gallery ==
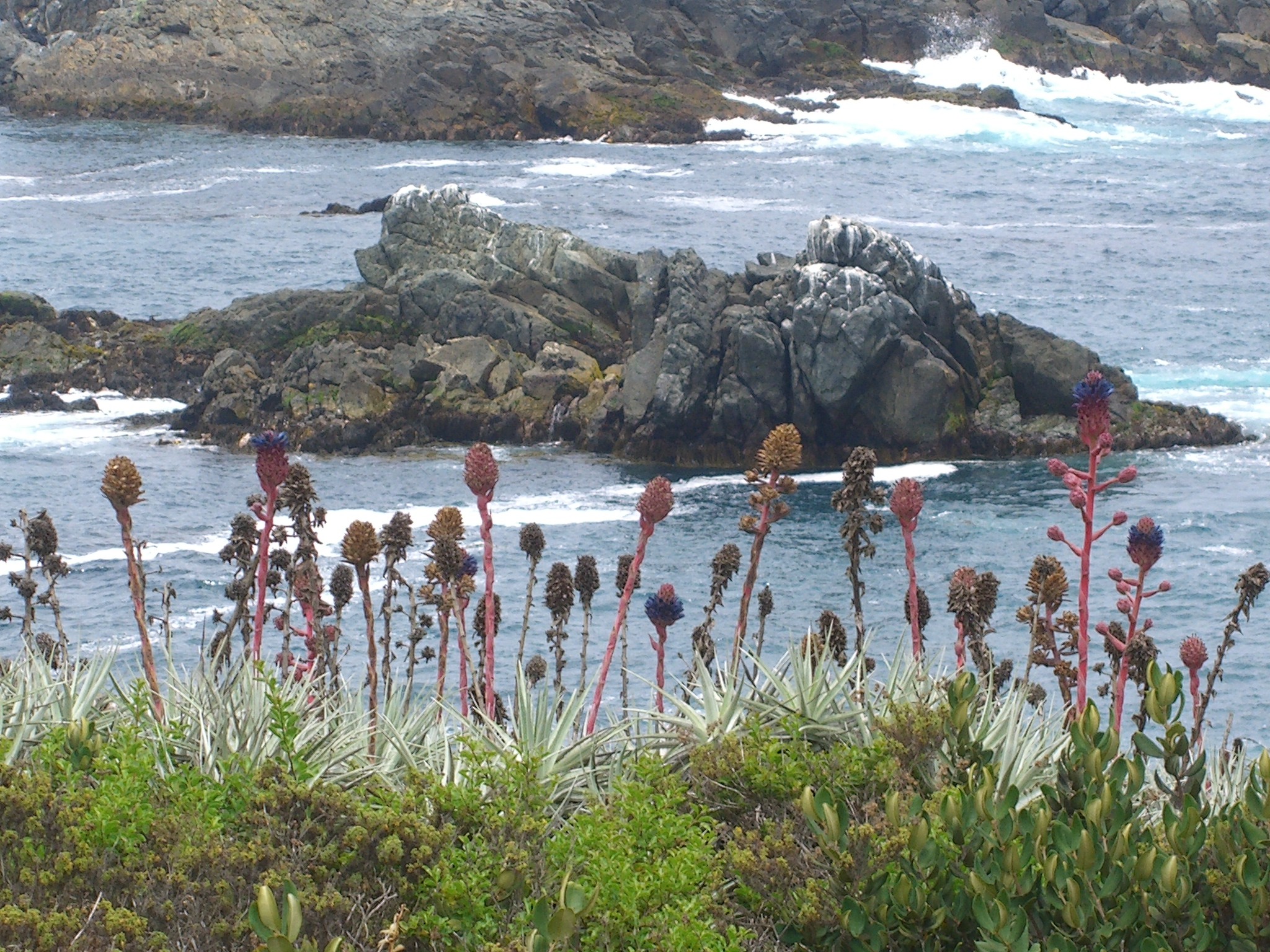
Puya venusta in its natural environment

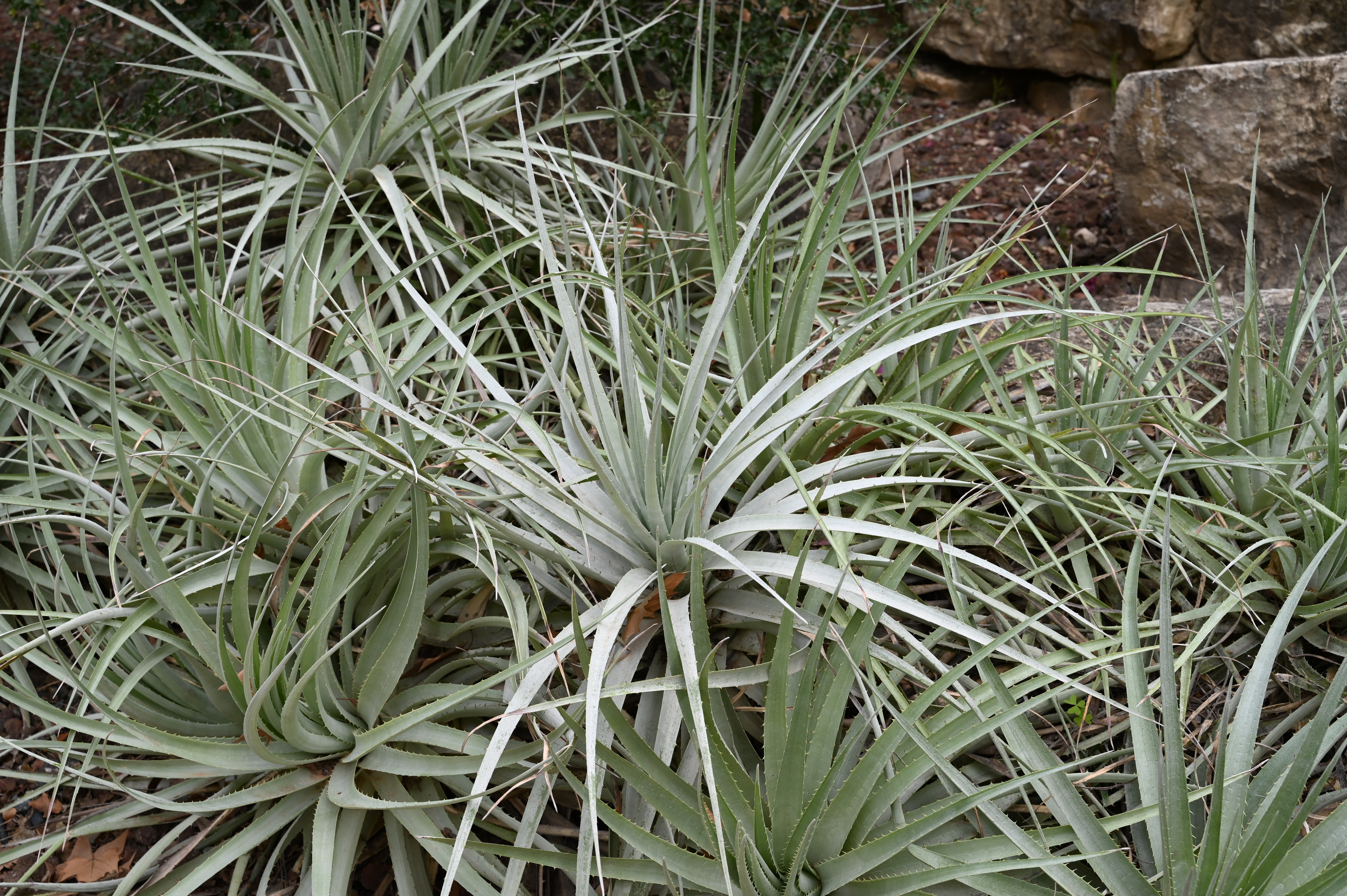
The foliage

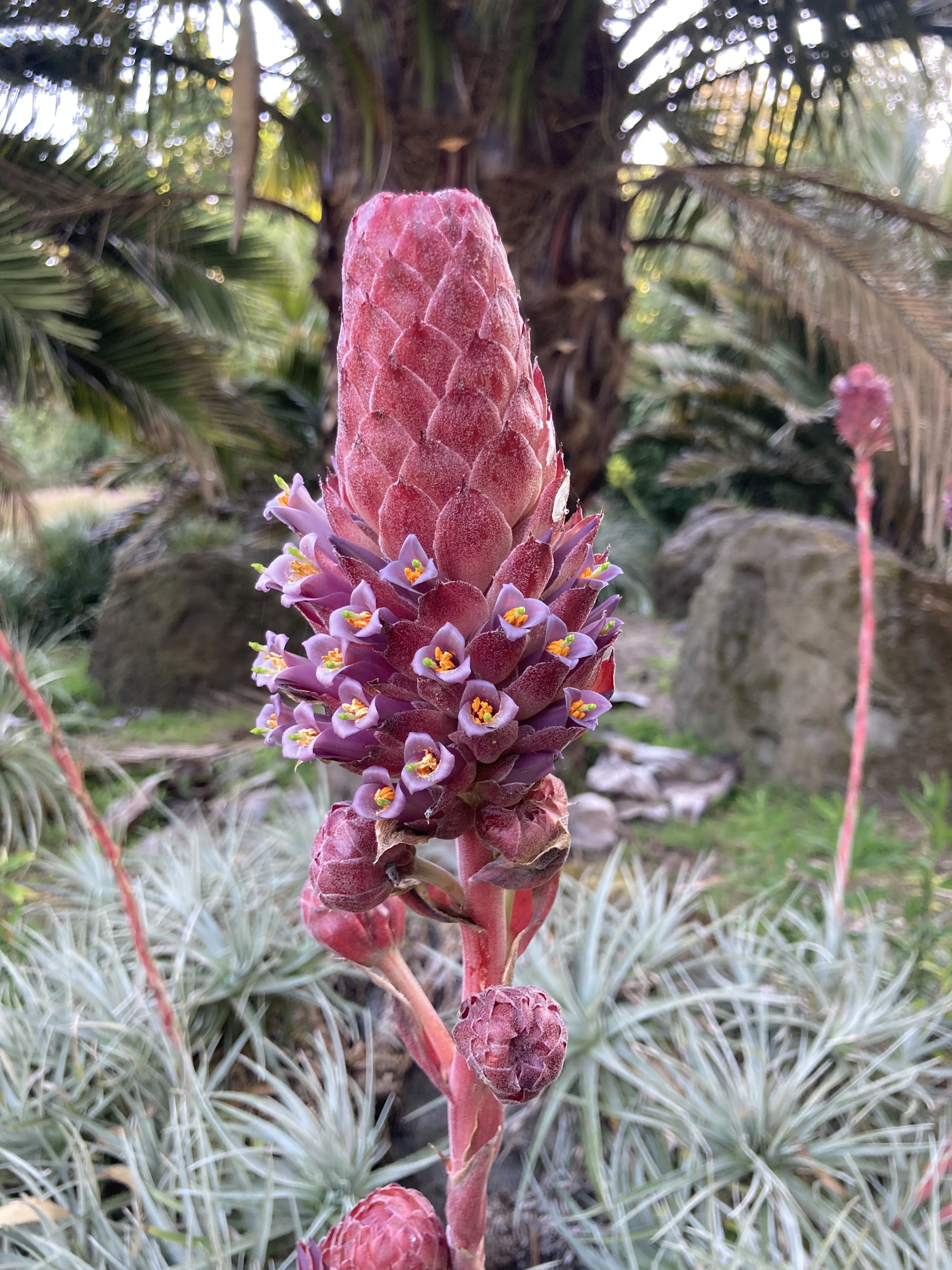
Detail of the flowers
