= Inverlochy Castle Hotel =

Hotel near Fort William, Scotland

Coordinates: 56°50′41.9″N 5°3′8.98″W

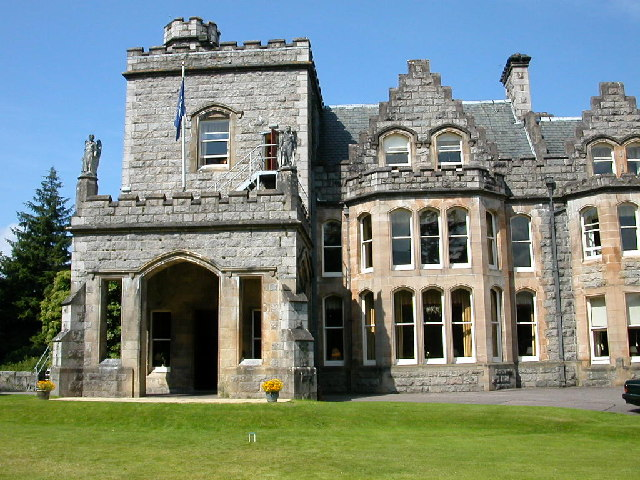
Inverlochy Castle Hotel

Inverlochy Castle Hotel, formerly known as Inverlochy Castle, is a 19th-century baronial mansion near Fort William, Scotland. It is located about two miles away from the 13th century Inverlochy Castle, after which it was named. This is a baronial mansion was built in 1863 by William Scarlett, 3rd Baron Abinger, soon after succeeding his father as Baron Abinger in 1861. Queen Victoria spent a week at Inverlochy during an 1873 visit to Balmoral, remarking "I never saw a lovelier or more romantic spot". The house and estate were sold in 1944 to a Canadian entrepreneur, Joseph Hobbs, the owner of the nearby Ben Nevis distillery. Upon inheriting the estate, Hobbs' son converted the house into a hotel, which opened for the first guests in 1969.

It was voted the number 17 "best hotel in Europe" by Travel + Leisure magazine in 2001.

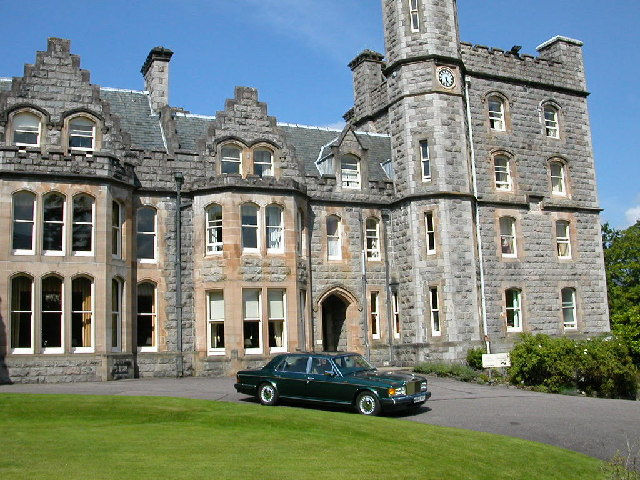
Inverlochy Castle Hotel
