= Inverlochy, Highland =

Coordinates: 56.8255°N 5.0947°W

Inverlochy: Scottish Gaelic: Inbhir Lochaidh
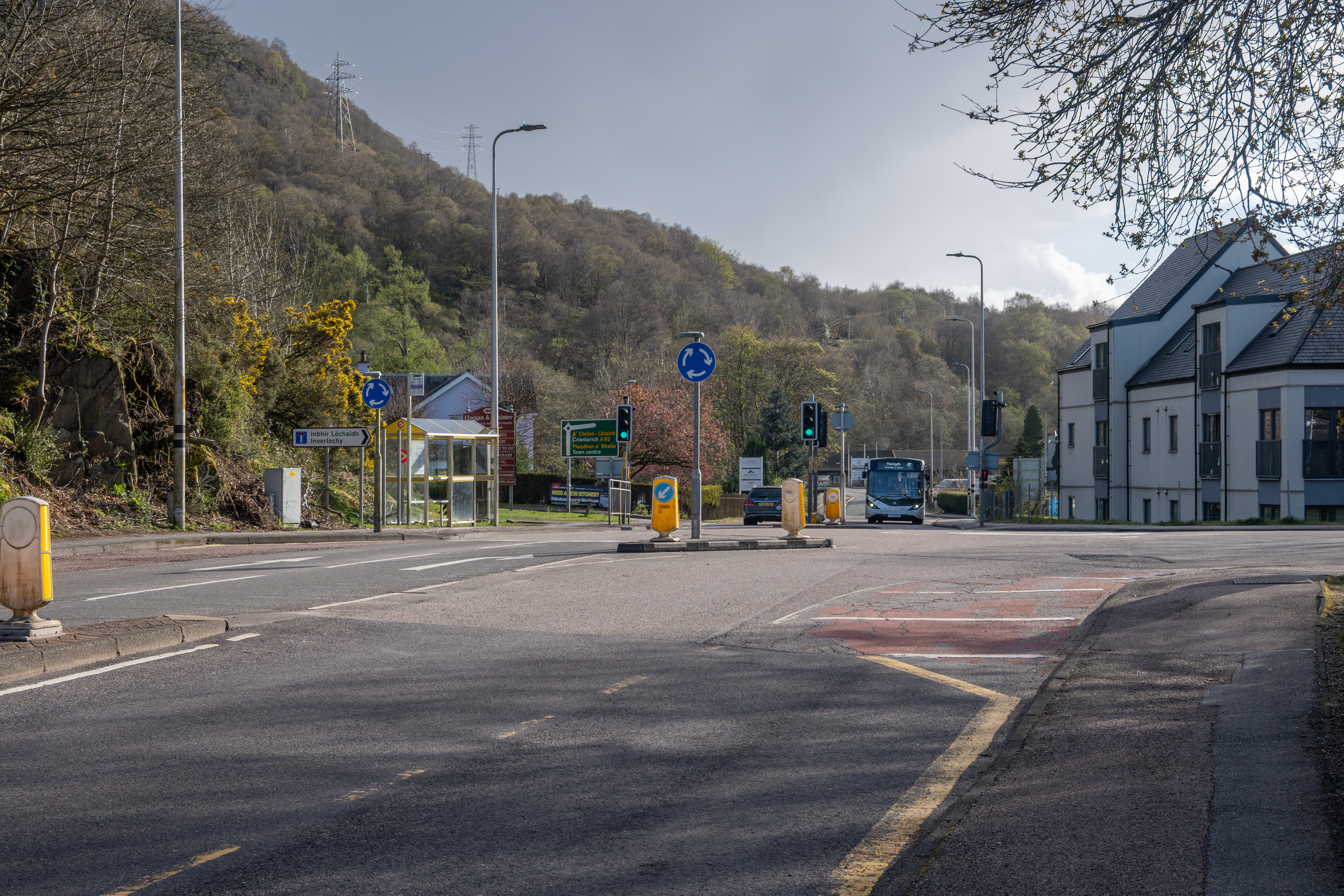

- Location within the Lochaber area
- Population: 945
- OS grid reference: NN 11274 74749
  - Edinburgh: 136 miles (219 km)
  - London: 503 miles (810 km)
- Council area: Highland
- Lieutenancy area: Inverness-shire
- Country: Scotland
- Sovereign state: United Kingdom
- Post town: FORT WILLIAM
- Postcode district: PH33
- Dialling code: 01397
- Police: Scotland
- Fire: Scottish
- Ambulance: Scottish
- UK Parliament: Ross, Skye and Lochaber
- Scottish Parliament: Inverness East, Nairn & Lochaber

Inverlochy (Scottish Gaelic: Inbhir Lochaidh, IPA:[ˈinivɪɾʲˈɫ̪ɔxɪ]) is a village north of Fort William, Highland, Scotland. Inverlochy is part of the Great Glen Way, a popular hiking and cycling route from Fort William to Inverness.

== History ==
The village was purpose-built in the 1920s by the British Aluminium Company to house workers.

Prior to this, nearby Inverlochy Castle was the location of battles in 1431 and 1645.

== See also ==
- Lochaber
