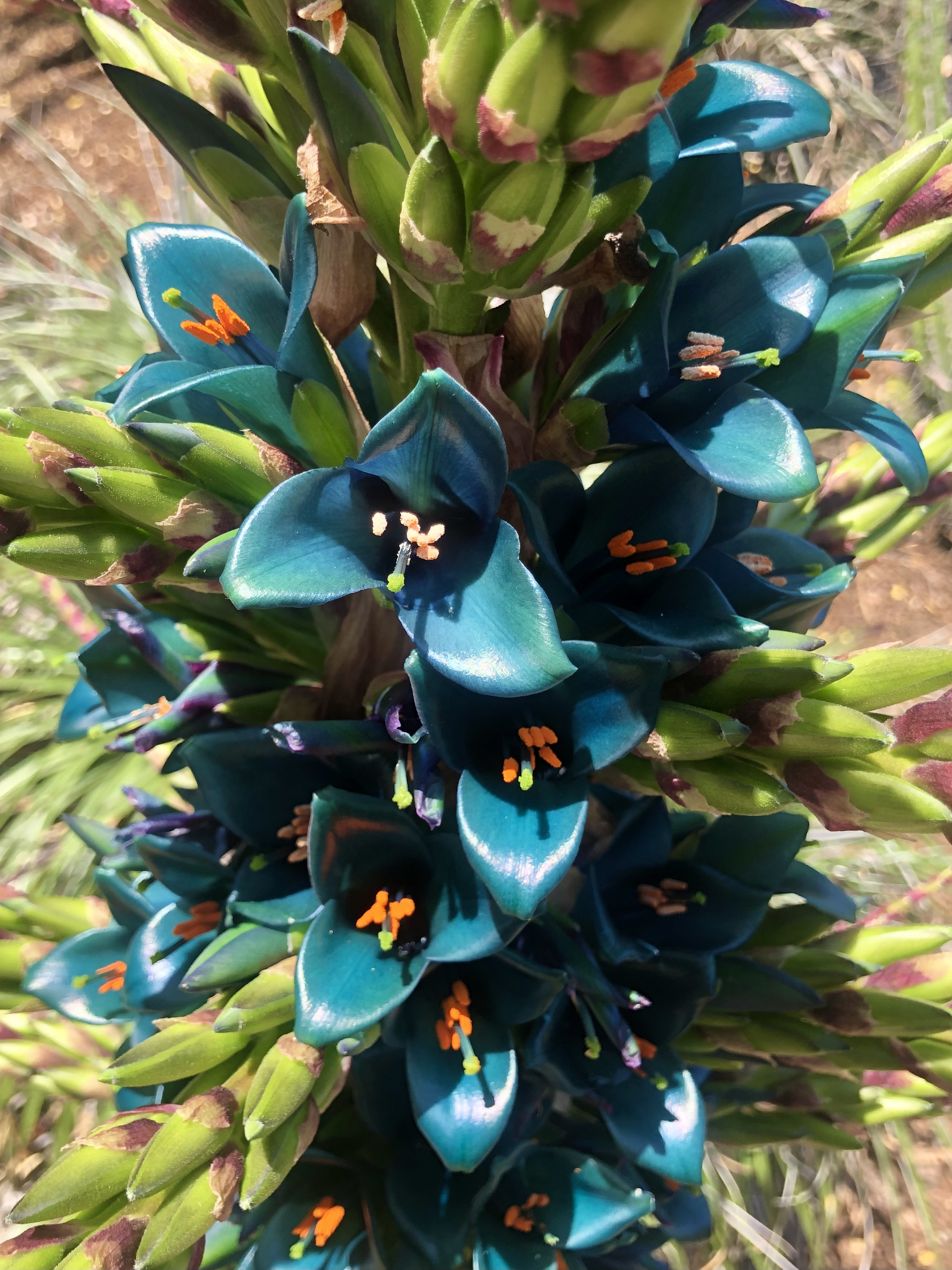
- Puya alpestris at San Diego Botanic Garden (Encinitas, CA)

Conservation status
- Least Concern (IUCN 2.3)

Scientific classification
- Kingdom: Plantae
- Clade: Embryophytes
- Clade: Tracheophytes
- Clade: Spermatophytes
- Clade: Angiosperms
- Clade: Monocots
- Clade: Commelinids
- Order: Poales
- Family: Bromeliaceae
- Genus: Puya
- Species: P. alpestris

Binomial name
- Puya alpestris (Poepp.) Gay 1833

Synonyms
- Pitcairnia alpestris (Poepp.) L.H.Bailey; Pourretia alpestris Poepp.; Puya whytei Hook.f.

= Puya alpestris =

Species of flowering plant

Puya alpestris is a species of bromeliad endemic to the Chilean Andes. It is native to dry hills, rock outcrops in central and southern Chile at elevations of 0 to 2200 meters. It is one of the most southerly occurring species within the family. It is one of the few Puya species that are grown in some parks and gardens as an ornamental plant. It is more commonly known as the Sapphire Tower.

== Description ==
Puya alpestris grows as a xerophytic, perennial plant. A dense rosette of leaves is formed on a short stem. The tough, stiffly protruding, parallel-veined leaves run into a sharp point, have a length of over 1 meter and a width of 2 to 2.5 centimeters. The leaf margin is reinforced with hooked, curved, spines that are approximately 0.5 cm long. The underside of the leaf is dense white scales.

After many years, an upright, loose, paniculate overall inflorescence is formed, which is composed of numerous racemose partial branching inflorescences. The lower third of the branch contain stellate trichomes. It contains many bright red bracts and many individual flowers. The tips of the partial inflorescences are sterile. The flower stalk is about 7 mm long. The hermaphrodite flower is threefold. The three greenish sepals are about 2.3 cm long and hairy or bald. The three teal petals with blunt tips are about 4.5 cm long and spiral in as they fade. The six stamens have bright orange anthers. The flowers produce high amounts of nectar. During the flowering period, hummingbirds and other birds pollinate the flowers. The plant blooms between October and December in habitat.

Capsule fruits are formed, in each of which many small, airworthy seeds are formed. After the seed development, the mother plant slowly dies.

== Ecology ==
Puya alpestris produces large amounts of nectar in each of its flowers. The culpeo fox is known to feed on its nectar, likely pollinating it in the process.

== Systematics ==
This species was first described by Eduard Friedrich Poeppig in 1833 in the Fragmentum Synopseos Plantarum Phanerogamum: 8 under the name Pourretia alpestris. The specific epithet alpestris for "Alps inhabiting" refers to the Andes for this species. Another synonym is Puya whytei Hook.f. described in Curtis's Botanical Magazine. A subspecies zoellneri was published in Brittonia in 2013. Puya alpestris is a member of the genus Puya, subgenus Puya.

=== Subspecies ===
A distinction is made between the following subspecies:

Image	Name	Description
	Puya alpestris ssp alpestris	Leaf blades 0.35–2.5[−3.2] cm, inflorescences with up to 20 lateral branches, flowering plants, flowering plants 1.2-2.5 meters tall
	Puya alpestris ssp zoellneri (Mez) Zizka, J.V. Schneid. & Novoa	Leaf blades up to 4.6 cm, inflorescences with at least 40 lateral branches, flowering plants (2–)2.5–4.5 meters tall

== Gallery ==
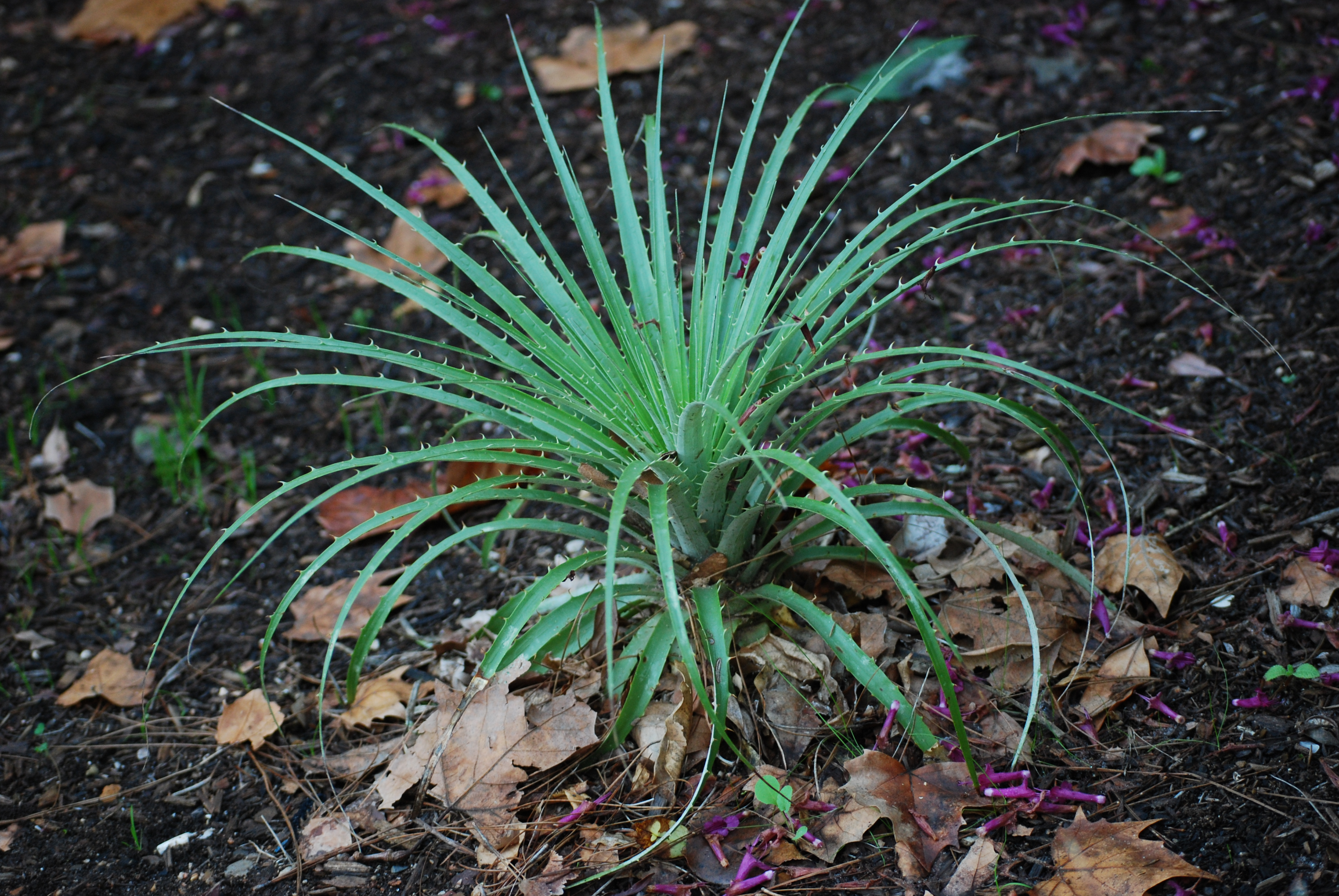
Plant

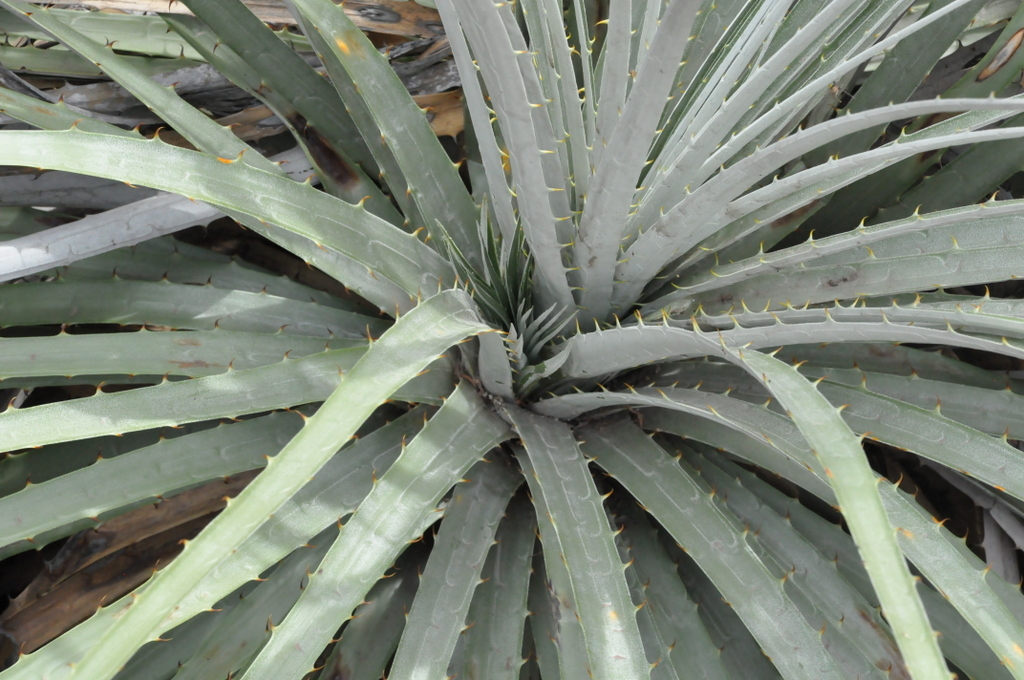
Spines

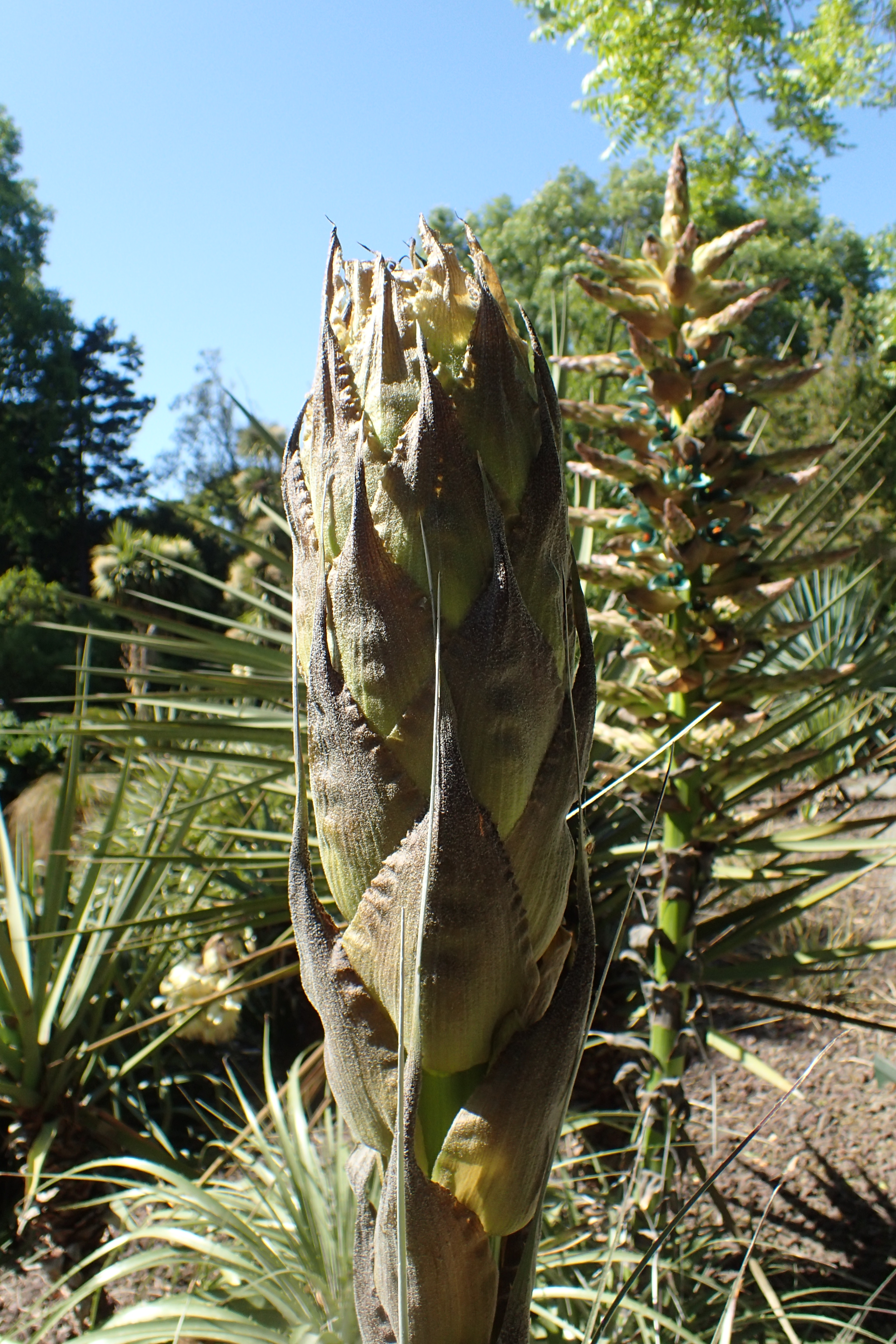
Inflorescence

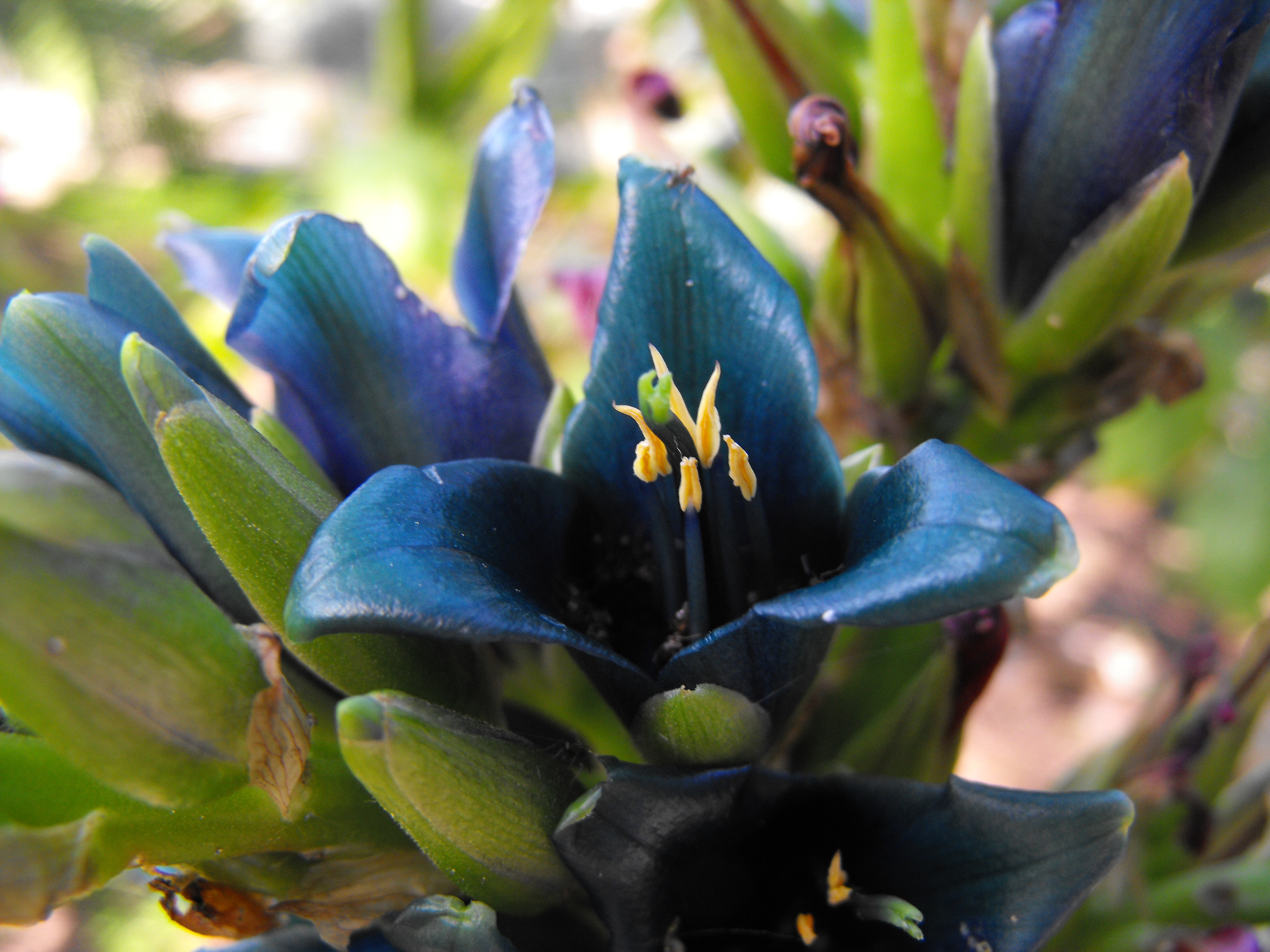
Flower P. alpestris ssp alpestris

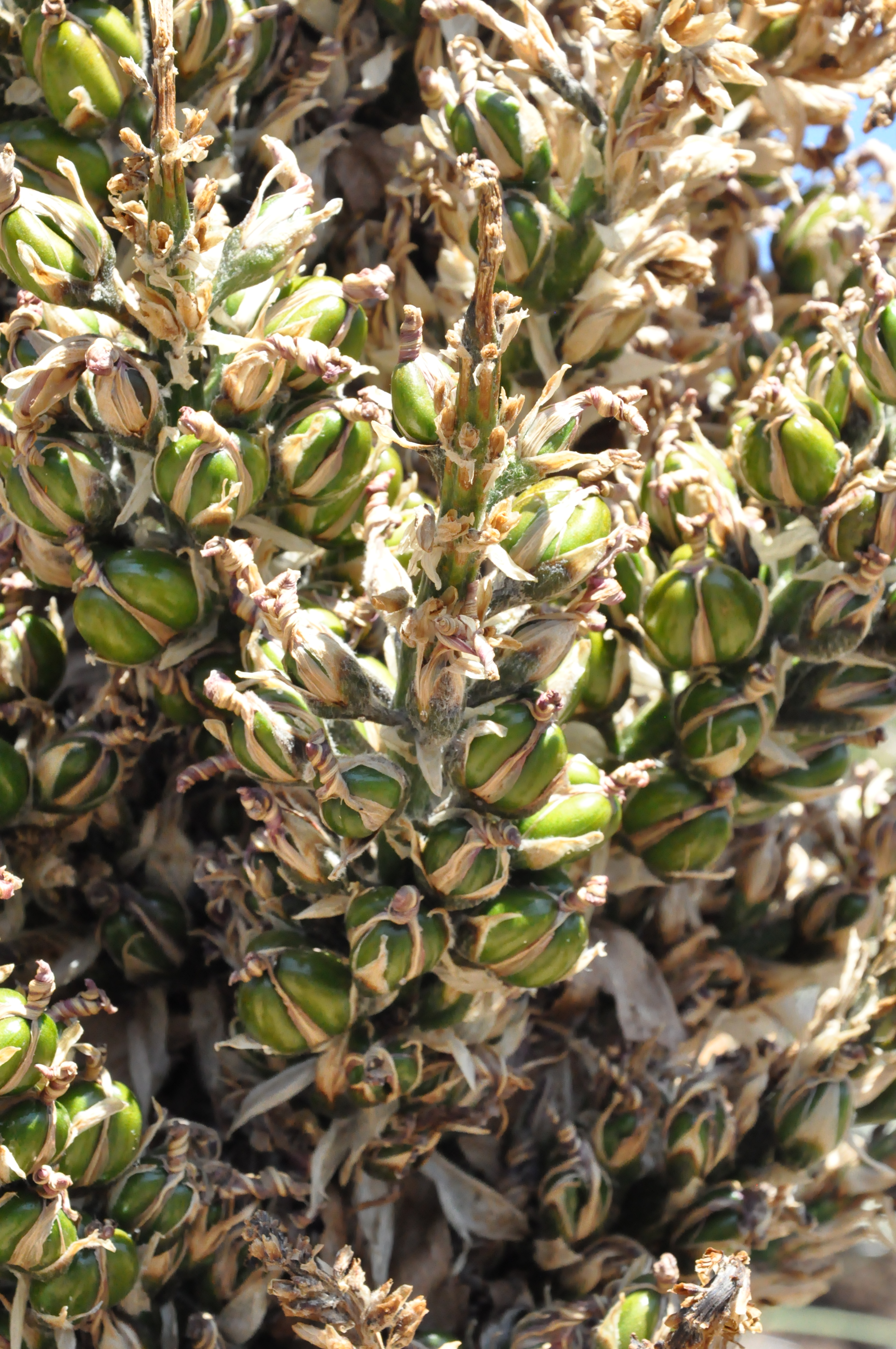
Fruits

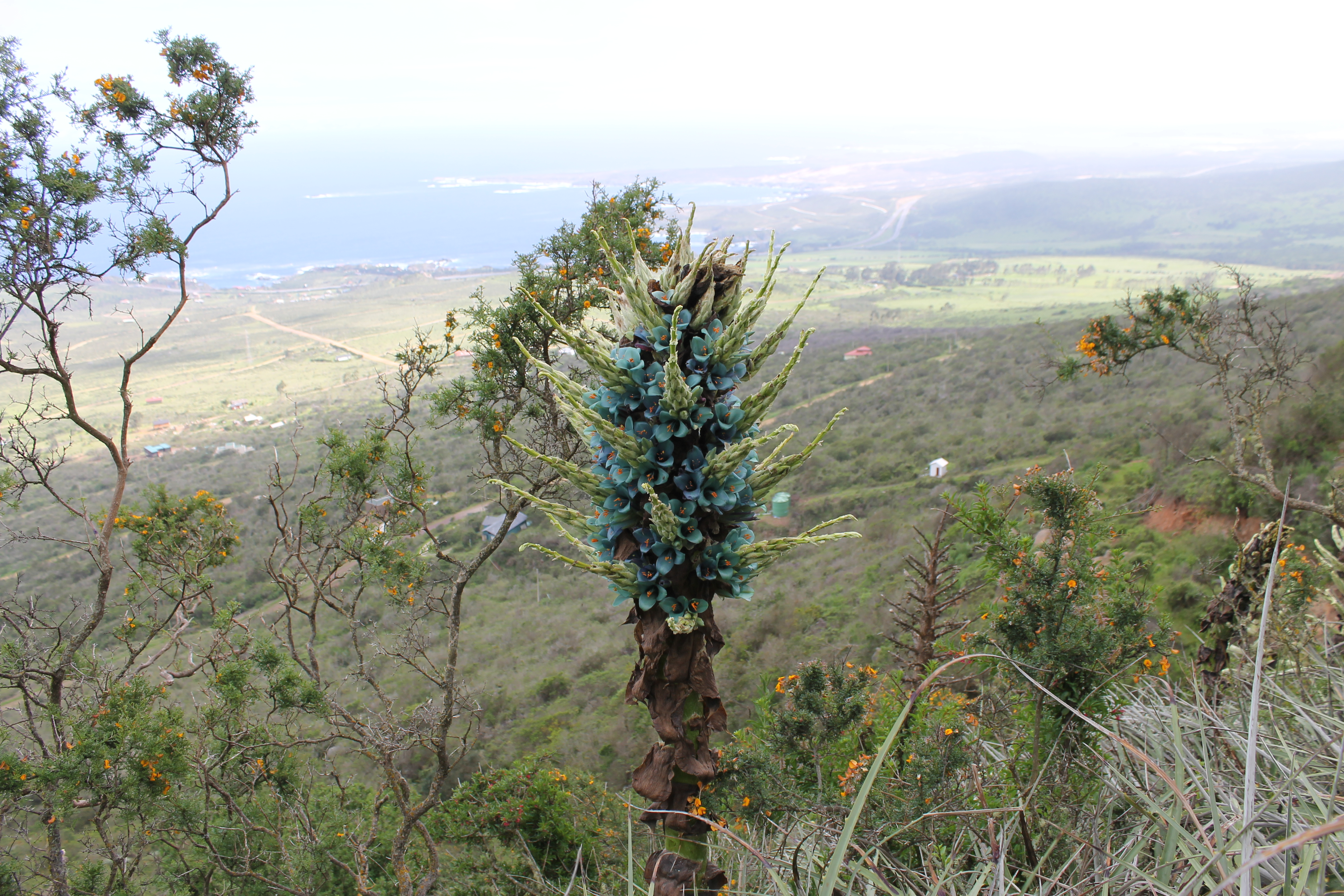
Habitat of P. alpestris ssp zoellneri
