= Albro v. Agawam Canal Co. =

- Court: Massachusetts Supreme Judicial Court
- Citation: 6 Cush. 75 (Mass. 1850)
- Cases cited: Farwell v. Boston and Worcester Railroad, 4 Met. 49 (Mass. 1842); Priestley v Fowler, 3 M. & W. 1, 150 ER 1030 (1837)

Case opinions
- Decision by: Justice Richard Fletcher

Keywords
- Fellow servant rule, Assumption of risk

Albro v. The Agawam Canal Co., 6 Cush. 75 (Mass. 1850), was a case in the Massachusetts Supreme Judicial Court that contributed to the "fellow servant rule".

== Background ==
A worker at a cotton manufacturing establishment sued her employer for injuries she sustained during the course of employment. Another employee, the superintendent of the plant, had been grossly negligent in instructing his subordinate, an overseer, who was in charge of the gas lighting. As a result, gas filled the room in which the plaintiff was working so as to "throw her into spasmodic fits, and occasion her a very serious and lasting injury." (The overseer was "hired and discharged by the superintendent, usually with the advice of the treasurer ... the overseers of the rooms hired and discharged the operatives employed in their respective rooms ... all these officers and operatives were paid for their services by the paymaster of the defendants, at their counting-room.") It was admitted that the plaintiff received the injury "through the gross negligence and want of skill of the superintendent, in directing the person employed in the manufacture of the gas, with which the mill was lighted, to throw off all the weights from the gasometer, by means of which the gas was forced into the mill;" and it was admitted "that the management of lighting the mill, and manufacturing gas for the purpose, was a matter under the control of the superintendent."

The applicable rule exempted an employer from liability to one employee for the negligence of its other employees since the injured employee was said to have "assumed the risk."

== Opinion of the court ==
The Supreme Judicial Court of Massachusetts logically extended the rule to include that superintendent as a fellow-servant, just another employee whose negligence in injuring a different employee would not render the employer liable. The injured employee presumably assumed the risk that even the superintendent might be grossly negligent.

=== Excerpt ===
This case cannot be distinguished in principle from the case of Farwell v. Boston and Worcester Railroad, 4 Met. 49; and the same point has been since adjudged in the case of Hayes v. Western Railroad, 3 Cush. 270.

The principle of these decisions is, that when one person engages in the service of another, he undertakes, as between him and his employer, to run all the ordinary risks of the service, and this includes the risk of negligence on the part of others in the service of the same employer, whenever he, such servant, is acting in the discharge of his duty to his employer, who is the common employer of both....

It cannot affect the principle, that the duties of the superintendent may be different, and perhaps may be considered as of a somewhat higher character than those of the plaintiff; inasmuch as they are both the servants of the same master, have the same employer, are engaged in the accomplishment of the same general object, are acting in one common service, and derive their compensation from the same source.

The plaintiff and the superintendent must be considered as fellow-servants, within the principle and meaning of the cases above referred to, and the other adjudged cases on this subject. There is no allegation, that the superintendent was not a fit and proper person to be employed by the defendants to perform the duties assigned to him, but only that he was chargeable with negligence and unskillfulness, on the particular occasion when the plaintiff was injured in the manner described. It would have presented a very different case, if the defendants had employed an unfit and improper person, and in that way the plaintiff had been exposed to and had suffered injury.

In the decision of the case of Farwell v. Boston and Worcester Railroad, the case of Priestly v. Fowler, 3 M. & W. 1, was referred to as an authority in point. There have recently been two other English cases (Hutchinson v. York, Newcastle, and Berwick Railway, 5 W. H. & G. 343; Wigmore v. Jay, Ib. 354,) which fully sustain the doctrine and decision of Priestly v. Fowler. It is very clear, therefore, upon the adjudged cases, that this action cannot be maintained, and that judgment must be entered for the defendants.
