= Lemuel Shaw =

American judge and legislator (1781–1861)

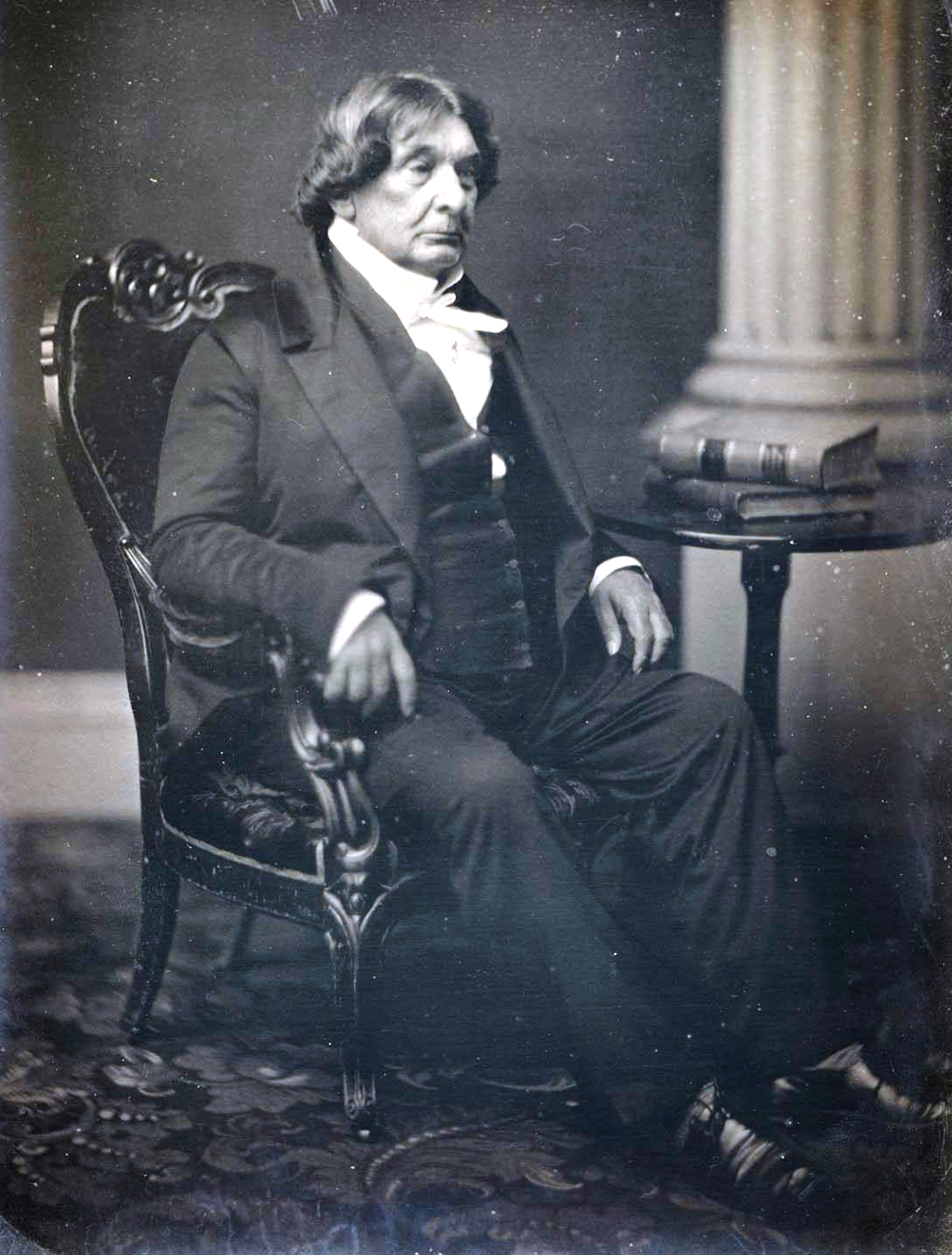
- Chief Justice Shaw in 1856

19th Chief Justice of the Massachusetts Supreme Judicial Court
- In office August 30, 1830 – August 21, 1860
- Appointed by: Levi Lincoln Jr.
- Preceded by: Isaac Parker
- Succeeded by: George Tyler Bigelow

Personal details
- Born: January 9, 1781 West Barnstable, Commonwealth of Massachusetts
- Died: March 30, 1861 (aged 80) Boston, Massachusetts, U.S.
- Party: Federalist; Whig
- Spouse(s): Elizabeth Knapp (m. 1818–22, her death); Hope Savage (m. 1827–61, his death)
- Education: Harvard College

Lemuel Shaw (January 9, 1781 – March 30, 1861) was an American jurist who served as chief justice of the Massachusetts Supreme Judicial Court (1830–1860). Prior to his appointment he also served for several years in the Massachusetts House of Representatives and as a state senator. In 1847, Shaw became the father-in-law of author Herman Melville. He ruled on prominent cases involving slavery, segregation, and religion.

== Early life and education ==
Shaw was born in West Barnstable, Massachusetts, the second son of the Rev. Oakes Shaw and his second wife Susanna, who was a daughter of John H. Hayward of Braintree. The Shaws were descendants of Abraham Shaw (January 2, 1590 – November 2, 1638), who left Halifax, England in 1636 and settled in Dedham. Oakes Shaw, a Congregationalist minister, was pastor of the West Church in Barnstable for forty-seven years. Lemuel was named for his uncle, Dr. Hayward of Boston, father of George Hayward, a noted surgeon and faculty member at Harvard Medical School.

Educated at home by his father except for a few months at Braintree, he entered Harvard in 1796. There, he taught school in winter vacations. After graduating with high honors in 1800, he taught for a year in a Boston public school, and wrote articles and read proof for the Boston Gazette, a Federalist newspaper.

In August 1801, he began studying law in Boston under David Everett. Meanwhile, he learned French proficiently from a refugee, Antoine Jay, afterwards a founder in France of the liberal newspaper Le Constitutionnel. In 1802, he moved with Everett to Amherst, New Hampshire, where besides doing legal work he contributed a poem on dancing and translations from French to the Farmers' Cabinet, a local newspaper. He became engaged to Nancy Melvill, daughter of Maj. Thomas Melvill of Boston (the subject of Oliver Wendell Holmes Sr.'s poem "The Last Leaf") but she died soon afterward.

== Legal and political career ==
Admitted to the bar in Hillsborough County, New Hampshire, in September 1804, and in Plymouth County, Massachusetts that November, Shaw began practice in Boston. When his associate left Boston after being acquitted of murder in a political quarrel, he practiced alone for fifteen years.

In about 1822, Shaw took Sidney Bartlett, an able trial lawyer, as his junior partner. His practice gradually became large, but he was less known as an advocate than as the adviser of important commercial enterprises.

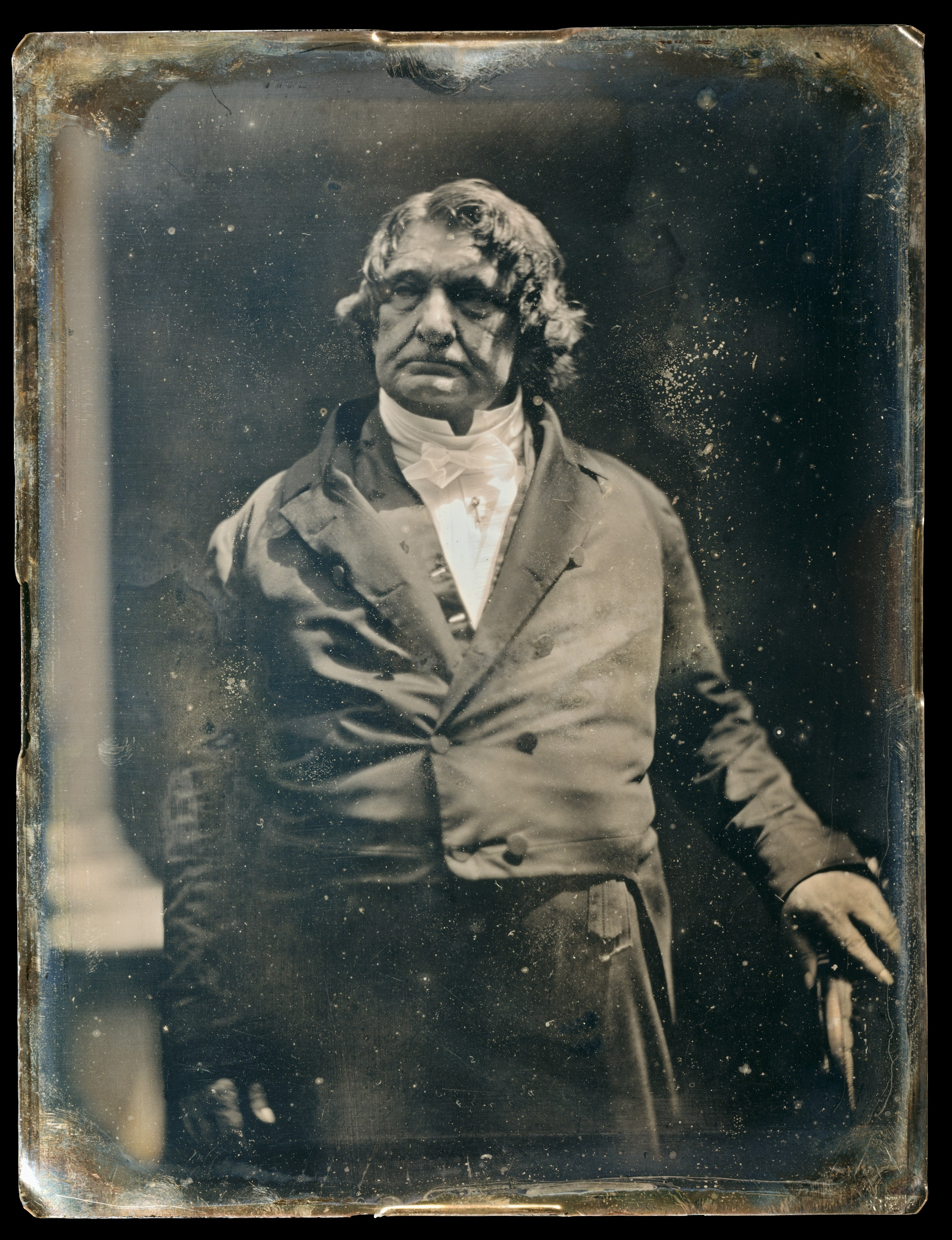
Portrait photograph

In politics, Shaw was first a Federalist and later a Webster Whig, but remained all his life a free-trader. He attended Unitarian services, though he was never a communicant. Fond of entertaining and dining out, he was simple and affectionate in his home life, his interest in the social events of his household extending to the minutest details.

Shaw was prepared for his judicial career by numerous public positions. He was elected a member of the Massachusetts House of Representatives, serving in 1811–14, 1820 and 1829, and as a state senator in 1821–22. He served as a member of the Massachusetts Constitutional Convention of 1820–1821. He also held many offices in Boston. Shaw was elected a Fellow of the American Academy of Arts and Sciences in 1823.

In 1822, with few precedents to guide him, he drafted the first charter of the city, which lasted until 1913.

== Chief Justice of Massachusetts ==
On the death of Chief Justice Isaac Parker, Governor Levi Lincoln offered Shaw an appointment as chief justice. Daniel Webster successfully urged Shaw to accept, though it meant giving up a practice of $15,000 to $20,000 a year for a salary of $3,500. And for this, if nothing else, Webster later thought the public owed him a debt of gratitude. Shaw's commission was issued on August 30, 1830. He served for almost exactly 30 years, resigning on August 21, 1860.

During his tenure as Chief Justice, Shaw authored over 2,150 legal opinions, and presided over a similar number of trials. Many of his legal opinions would help shape American law and jurisprudence. His exceptionally long judicial career coincided with the development of many important industries and, coincidentally, Shaw made law on such matters as water power, railroads, and other public utilities. Some commentators have argued that Shaw had more influence on the development of American law than any other state court judge in the country's history. One hundred years after he came onto the court as Chief Justice, it was observed that his legal opinions influenced the United States Supreme Court, the development of the common law in every American state, and were observed favorably in England. At a minimum, he was among the leading early to mid-Nineteenth Century American state court judges, such as Chancellor James Kent (New York), Theophilus Parsons (Massachusetts), John Bannister Gibson (Pennsylvania), Thomas Ruffin (North Carolina), Peter Hitchcock (Ohio), and François Xavier Martin (Louisiana), who were building their courts and the law in the early history of the United States. In developing the common law, Shaw adapted traditional common law principles in innovative ways to adjudicate disputes arising out of the rapidly changing circumstances and conditions in the world around him, that occurred during his 30-year tenure.

Shaw's opinions were not often readily quotable and are instead recognized for solid reasoning. "His words had weight rather than brilliancy or eloquence." His reputation as a jurist lies mostly in the substance of his work, as opposed to the literary quality of his writings for the court.

In Shaw's time on the Massachusetts Supreme Judicial Court, the chief justice often sat at trials. In the role of a trial judge, he was considered to be thorough, systematic, and patient. He was also renowned for his ability to clearly instruct juries.

=== Slavery and civil rights ===
Because of Boston's strong abolitionist movement, Shaw oversaw numerous cases related to slave law and race.

In 1836, Shaw's opinion in Commonwealth v. Aves held that a slave brought voluntarily into Massachusetts, a free state, was a "sojourner," or a journeyer, and not taking domicile in that state. Therefore, slaves could be brought into the state only for a limited time. Abolitionists, who had brought the habeas corpus suit, wanted a rule which would have freed the girl, while southern defenders of the practice wanted the court to uphold the concept of comity and acknowledge the legality of slavery. Shaw attempted to split the decision by applying the archaic "sojourner" status to slaves.

Further, Shaw rejected the doctrine of interstate comity. In his strict understanding, comity is a vehicle for facilitating trade and amicable interactions between jurisdictions. Therefore, Shaw reasoned that a state or jurisdiction is not required to honor comity if in doing so it is sanctioning practices repugnant to the state's own norms. Shaw acknowledged that slavery was lawful under the international law of the time but stated it was "contrary to natural right" without providing an authority or precedent for balancing natural rights against the state interest in comity.

The Aves case caused an uproar in the South where planters accused the Northerners of denying their equal sovereign status. Shaw also drew criticism from conservative jurists in other Northern states, as in State v. Post (N.J. 1845), which stated that New Jersey still allowed slavery.

His ruling in favor of the constitutionality of school segregation in Roberts v. City of Boston (1849) established "separate but equal" as a legal doctrine in the state.

In a later case, he again refused to release fugitive slave Thomas Sims on habeas corpus grounds, as he felt bound by the Constitution and the law, as the recent Fugitive Slave Act of 1850 required states and local governments to cooperate in the capture of escaped slaves. Sims' Case was the first by any court in the United States to uphold the constitutionality of the Fugitive Slave Act.

=== Commonwealth v. Webster (1850) ===
No single case brought Shaw such criticism or such respect as the Parkman–Webster murder case, i.e., Commonwealth v. Webster, held in Boston in March 1850.

While Shaw was Chief Justice, the Supreme Judicial Court still possessed exclusive jurisdiction over all capital crimes: capital cases were tried by a jury presided over by the Chief Justice attended by his associate justices. At such a trial all points of law were argued fully by counsel and settled on the spot by decisions as "final and conclusive" as those of the highest appellate court on a bill of exceptions.

Such an accommodation was rooted in the consideration that the defendant and the public had a unique interest in securing, in the first instance, a verdict based on correct and authoritative rulings and, therefore, in avoiding repeated trials.

The trial lasted eleven days with the court sitting from nine in the morning until seven in the evening with a lunch break of one and one-half hours. Joel Parker, a professor at Harvard Law School and former Chief Justice of New Hampshire, 1838 to 1848, noted that "the trial, in the course of its progress, was a cause of extreme excitement, extending through the whole length and breadth of the land, and reaching even into foreign countries." On March 30, after the defense's closing remarks were concluded, after the prosecution's closing remarks lasting nearly five hours and after a brief un-sworn statement by the defendant himself, Chief Justice Shaw delivered a three-hours-long charge to the jury.

Frederic Hathaway Chase in his 1918 biography of Shaw wrote: "Probably no charge ever delivered in this country has been followed as a precedent so frequently and so closely as this memorable effort. With the dignity of expression and the clearness of thought and language ... he expounded the law of homicide in terms which have been followed closely in nearly every murder trial from that day to this."

In his charge to the jury, sometimes referred to as "the Webster charge", Shaw reviewed and/or refuted portions of the testimony heard and, in turn, defined murder, manslaughter, circumstantial evidence and reasonable doubt. Chase notes that regarding Shaw's review of the evidence presented that "it must be remembered that at the time when this case was tried there was no statute forbidding the court to charge upon the facts. It was within the power of the court at that time, as it is not now, to express an opinion as to the weight of evidence."

Shaw's charge to the jury was something less than unanimously well received in 1850. One pamphleteer at the time, identifying himself only as a "Member of the Legal Profession" wrote:

It seems scarcely credible that Judge Shaw could have given utterance to the language published in his "charge to the jury." From the beginning to the end it is but an argument against the prisoner. An argument with all the moral force of a dictation to the jury, a dictation which makes a pretended trial by twelve men a mockery and a farce. ... What ulterior purpose was to be accomplished or what feeling of interest or resentment was to be gratified by such an extraordinary judicial usurpation as this we do not pretend even to conjecture; but we do not hesitate to declare that to find a parallel for such an unscrupulous prostitution of dignity, such an unblushing betrayal of the judicial office, we must go back to the days of Jeffreys.

The definition of murder as stated by Shaw was "the killing of any person in the peace of the Commonwealth, with malice aforethought, either express or implied by law." Malice, as defined by the Chief Justice, included "not only anger, hatred and revenge, but every other unlawful and unjustifiable motive." Manslaughter was defined by Shaw as "the unlawful killing of another without malice". The distinction, as Leonard W. Levy notes, is "no small matter, particularly to the accused whose life is at stake. The existence of malice distinguishes murder from manslaughter, and manslaughter, the unlawful killing of a human being without malice, does not carry the death penalty."

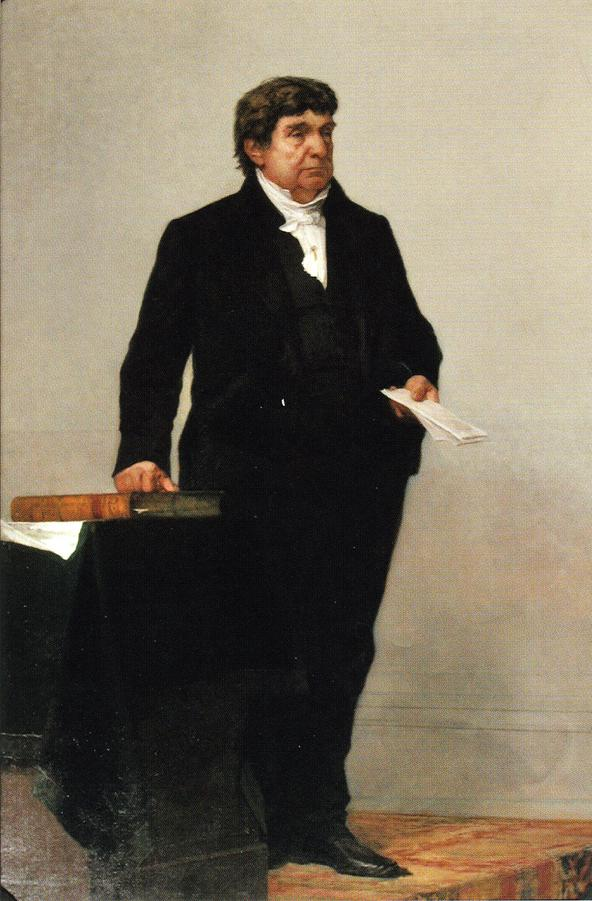
Portrait by William Morris Hunt

Having made the distinction in the law between murder and manslaughter, Shaw then argued, "Upon this subject, the rule as deduced from the authorities is, that the implication of malice arises in every case of intentional homicide; and, the fact of killing being first proved, all the circumstances of accident, necessity, or infirmity, are to be satisfactorily established by the party charged, unless they arise out of the evidence produced against him to prove the homicide, and the circumstances attending it." While this would appear to be contrary to the principle of "innocent until proven guilty," Shaw's charge to the jury has been interpreted to mean that if the prosecution's evidence proves that a life was taken and does not produce any evidence of extenuating circumstances, the law will imply that malice existed. It then, and only then, becomes the defense's burden to show extenuating circumstances.

In 1850, the law required the prosecution to prove the existence of a crime, that is, the corpus delicti. In murder cases this had generally meant that the prosecution had to physically produce the corpse of the person alleged to have been murdered. In that only body parts and some teeth had been found, Shaw stated,

This case is to be proved, if proved at all, by circumstantial evidence; because it is not suggested that any direct evidence can be given, or that any witness can be called to give direct testimony upon the main fact of the killing. It becomes important, therefore, to state what circumstantial evidence is; to point out the distinction between that and positive or direct evidence; and to give you some idea of the mode in which a judicial investigation is to be pursued by the aid of circumstantial evidence. The distinction, then, between direct and circumstantial evidence, is this. Direct or positive evidence is when a witness can be called to testify to the precise fact which is the subject of the issue in trial; that is, in a case of homicide, that the party accused did cause the death of the deceased. Whatever may be the kind or force of the evidence, this is the fact to be proved. ... Circumstantial evidence, therefore, is founded on experience and observed facts and coincidences, establishing a connection between the known and proved facts and the fact sought to be proved. The advantages are, that, as the evidence commonly comes from several witnesses and different sources, a chain of circumstances is less likely to be falsely prepared and arranged, and falsehood and perjury are more likely to be detected and fail of their purpose.

Shaw further stated:

The evidence must establish the corpus delicti, as it is termed, or the offence committed as charged; and, in case of homicide, must not only prove a death by violence, but must, to a reasonable extent, exclude the hypothesis of suicide, and a death by the act of any other person. This is to be proved beyond reasonable doubt. Then, what is reasonable doubt? It is a term often used, probably pretty well understood, but not easily defined. It is not mere possible doubt; because everything relating to human affairs and depending on moral evidence is open to some possible or imaginary doubt. It is that state of the case, which, after the entire comparison and consideration of all the evidence, leaves the minds of jurors in that condition that they cannot say they feel an abiding conviction, to a moral certainty, of the truth of the charge. The burden of proof is upon the prosecutor.

Sullivan makes the case in his book that Shaw overstepped his judicial bounds in his charge to the jury. Sullivan cites "Starkie, McNally, and Roscoe, the leading authorities upon the law of criminal evidence in 1850" and notes that they "made it quite clear that the fact of the corpus delicti, or the commission of the homicide, had to be proven by direct evidence to an absolute certainty, or beyond the least doubt. After this had been established absolutely, then the burden of proof was on the prosecution to show that the defendant had committed the crime beyond a reasonable doubt."

"In his charge, however," Sullivan notes that "Shaw set a new standard for the degree of proof required to show the commission of the homicide. He stated that the corpus delicti was to be proved "beyond a reasonable doubt" only, and then the guilt of the accused "beyond a reasonable doubt" also. He further instructed the jury that the corpus delicti could be established beyond a reasonable doubt by circumstantial evidence alone." The case against Webster was one of the first capital cases to be won by the prosecution without absolute evidence that the victim had been murdered.

=== Other noted cases ===
- The trial of anti-Catholic rioters who destroyed the Ursuline convent in Charlestown in Commonwealth v. Buzzell (1834).
- In Farwell v. Boston & Worcester Railroad Corp. (1842), Shaw created the "fellow servant" rule, using contract rationale to prevent a railroad laborer from recovering from his employer. Shaw held that the laborer was at liberty to prevent his injury and for the corporation to insure against it would create a moral hazard problem. The decision empowered both the railroad industry and the insurance industry, which now had a market for insuring against workplace injuries.
- In Commonwealth v. Hunt (1842), Shaw provided an important precedent in labor relations by arguing that members of labor unions were not engaging in criminal conspiracies against their employers.
- In Cary v. Daniels, 8 Metcalf (1844), Shaw created an important legal precedent in Massachusetts regarding the regulation of water power rights belonging to riparian proprietors.
- In Cobb v. Cobb (1847), Shaw presided over the unsuccessful divorce case of Henry Cobb against his wife Augusta Adams Cobb, for joining the Mormons and eventually marrying Brigham Young in a polygamous marriage.
- In Commonwealth v. Goode (1849), Shaw presided over the trial of Washington Goode, a black seaman convicted and executed on circumstantial evidence of murdering a fellow black mariner.
- In Brown v. Kendall (1850), Shaw established negligence as the dominant standard of tort law, and ruled that injured plaintiffs have the burden of proving that the defendant was negligent.
- Shaw's opinion in Commonwealth v. Alger (1851) was an early and influential attempt to define the limits of state police power.

== Personal life ==
On January 6, 1818, Shaw married Elizabeth Knapp, daughter of Josiah Knapp of Boston. She died in 1822, leaving a son and a daughter, Elizabeth, who became the wife of author Herman Melville. He was the nephew of Shaw's former fiancée. In 1847, the year of his marriage to Elizabeth, Melville dedicated his Polynesian novel, Typee, to Lemuel Shaw. Shaw also may have been the model for Captain Vere in Billy Budd, Sailor (An Inside Narrative), due to his unflinching application of the harsh fugitive slave law.

On August 29, 1827, Shaw married Hope Savage, daughter of Dr. Samuel Savage of Barnstable; they had two sons.

Widely read in English literature, Shaw was also attracted by new mechanical processes and was a member of many learned and charitable societies. He was a fellow of Harvard College from 1834 until his death, and an overseer from 1831 to 1853, two offices rarely united.

Shaw was elected a member of the American Antiquarian Society in 1855.

== Resignation and death ==
After his resignation from the bench in 1860, his health failed, and he died within a few months. He was buried in Mount Auburn Cemetery.

Legal offices
Preceded by Isaac Parker	Chief Justice of the Massachusetts Supreme Judicial Court; August 30, 1830–August 21, 1860	Succeeded by George Tyler Bigelow
