= Royal Garrison Church =

Royal Garrison Church may refer to:

- Royal Garrison Church, 'home' church for the Anglican military personnel serving at Aldershot in Hampshire in the UK
- Domus Dei, an almshouse and hospice at Portsmouth in Hampshire, UK, also known as the Royal Garrison Church
