= James Scarlett, 1st Baron Abinger =

British lawyer, politician and judge (1769–1844)

The Right Honourable The Lord Abinger PC
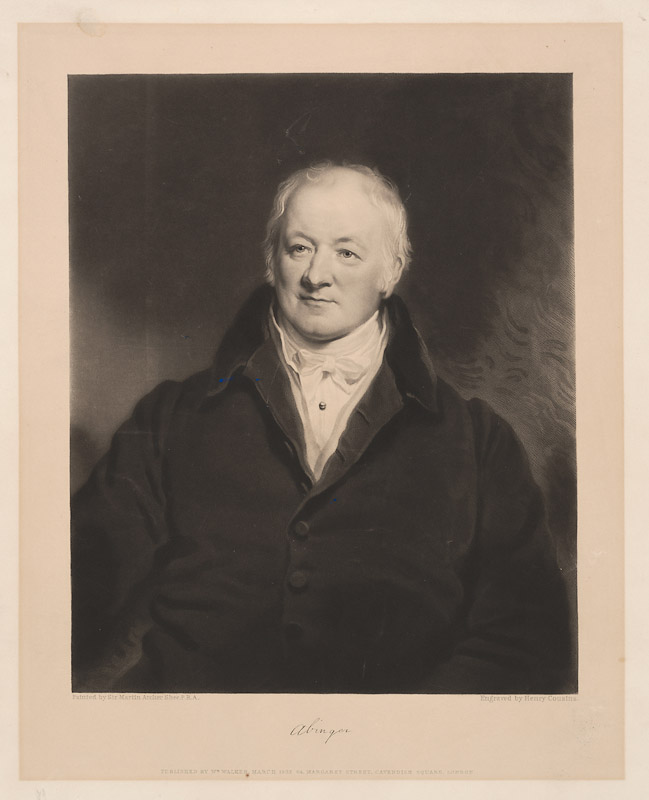
- Painting of Scarlett by Martin Archer Shee
- Born: James Scarlett; 13 December 1769; Jamaica
- Died: 17 April 1844 (aged 74); Bury St Edmunds, Suffolk, England
- Education: Trinity College, Cambridge (BA)
- Children: 5, including Robert, James, and Peter
- Relatives: William Anglin Scarlett (brother)

James Scarlett, 1st Baron Abinger (13 December 1769 – 17 April 1844) was a British lawyer, politician and judge.

== Early life ==
James Scarlett was born in the British colony of Jamaica, where his father, Robert Scarlett, owned slave plantations. In the summer of 1785 he was sent to England to complete his education at Hawkshead Grammar School and afterwards at Trinity College, Cambridge, taking his Bachelor of Arts degree in 1789. Having entered the Inner Temple he took the advice of Samuel Romilly, studied law on his own for a year, and then was taught by George Wood. He was called to the bar in 1791, and joined the northern circuit and the Lancashire sessions.

== Legal and political career ==
Though Scarlett had no professional connections, he gradually obtained a large practice, ultimately confining himself to the Court of King's Bench and the northern circuit. He took silk in 1816, and from this time till the close of 1834 he was the most successful lawyer at the bar; he was particularly effective before a jury, and his income reached £18,500, a large sum for that period. He first entered parliament in 1819 as Whig member for Peterborough, representing that constituency with a short break (1822–1823) till 1830, when he was elected for the borough of Malton. He became Attorney General, and was made a Knight Bachelor when Canning formed his ministry in 1827; and though he resigned when the Duke of Wellington came into power in 1828, he resumed office in 1829 and went out with the Duke in 1830.

His opposition to the Reform Bill caused him to leave the Whigs and join the Tories, and he was elected, first for Cockermouth in 1831 and then in 1832 for Norwich, for which he sat until the dissolution of parliament in 1835. He was appointed Lord Chief Baron of the Exchequer in 1834, and presided in that court for more than nine years. He was appointed to the Privy Council at the end of that year. He was raised to the peerage as Baron Abinger, of Abinger in the County of Surrey and of the City of Norwich in 1835, taking his title from the Surrey estate he had bought in 1813. The qualities which brought him success at the bar were not equalled on the bench; he had a reputation for unfairness, and complaints were made about his domineering attitude towards juries.

While he was studying in England, he became the guardian of Edward Moulton, who later assumed his mother's family name, and became the father of the poet Elizabeth Barrett, later Elizabeth Barrett Browning. The Scarletts and the Barretts had been friends for many years in Jamaica, and it seems natural that James Scarlett would have been selected to keep an eye on young Moulton, while the boy was at school in England. In a note prefixed to the Collected Edition of his wife's poems, Robert Browning tells us that "On the early death of his father, he (Edward Moulton) was brought from Jamaica to England when a very young child, as ward to the late Chief Baron Lord Abinger, then Mr. Scarlett, whom he frequently accompanied in his post-chaise when on pursuit."

== Family ==
Lord Abinger was twice married (the second time only six months before his death), and by his first wife (d. 1829) had three sons and two daughters, the title passing to his eldest son, Robert. His second son was General Sir James Yorke Scarlett, leader of the heavy cavalry charge at Balaklava. His third son, Peter Campbell Scarlett, was a diplomat. His elder daughter, Mary, married John Campbell, 1st Baron Campbell, and was herself created Baroness Stratheden. Sir William Anglin Scarlett, Lord Abinger's younger brother, was chief justice of Jamaica. While attending the Norfolk circuit on 2 April, Lord Abinger was suddenly seized with apoplexy, and died in his lodgings at Bury St Edmunds.

A more distant relation was the painter John Scarlett Davis.

== Cases ==
- Priestley v Fowler (1837)
- Fouldes v. Willoughby (1841)
- Winterbottom v Wright (1842)

== Property ==
In 1836, Scarlett was awarded compensation of £626 2s 2d for 30 slaves on the Spring Grove estate in Manchester, Jamaica.

Parliament of the United Kingdom
Preceded by William Elliot; William Lamb	Member of Parliament for Peterborough; Feb 1819 – 1830; With: William Lamb Feb–Nov 1819; Sir Robert Heron, Bt Nov 1819–1830	Succeeded by Viscount Milton; Sir Robert Heron, Bt
Preceded by Viscount Normanby; John Charles Ramsden	Member of Parliament for Malton; 1830–1831; With: John Charles Ramsden	Succeeded by John Charles Ramsden; Francis Jeffrey
Preceded by Philip Pleydell-Bouverie; Viscount Garlies	Member of Parliament for Cockermouth; 1831–1832; With: John Lowther	Succeeded by Fretchville Lawson Ballantine Dykes; Henry Aglionby Aglionby
Preceded by Richard Hanbury Gurney; Robert Grant	Member of Parliament for Norwich; 1832–1835; With: Viscount Stormont	Succeeded by Robert Scarlett; Viscount Stormont
Legal offices
Preceded by Sir Charles Wetherell	Attorney General for England and Wales; 1827–1828	Succeeded by Sir Charles Wetherell
Preceded by Sir Charles Wetherell	Attorney General for England and Wales; 1829–1830	Succeeded by Sir Thomas Denman
Preceded by The Lord Lyndhurst	Lord Chief Baron of the Exchequer; 1834–1844	Succeeded by Sir Frederick Pollock
Peerage of the United Kingdom
New creation	Baron Abinger; 1835–1844	Succeeded by Robert Campbell Scarlett
