= William Scarlett =

William Scarlett may refer to:

- William Scarlett (bishop), bishop of the Episcopal Diocese of Missouri
- William Scarlett, 3rd Baron Abinger, British peer and soldier
- William Anglin Scarlett, Colony of Jamaica judge

== See also ==
- Will Scarlet, member of Robin Hood's Merry Men
