= Robert Scarlett, 2nd Baron Abinger =

British barrister-at-law and politician (1794–1861)

The Lord Abinger DL
- Born: Robert Campbell Scarlett; 5 September 1794; London, England
- Died: 24 June 1861 (aged 66)
- Education: Trinity College, Cambridge (BA, MA)
- Children: William
- Father: James Scarlett, 1st Baron Abinger
- Relatives: James Yorke Scarlett (brother); Peter Campbell Scarlett (brother); William Anglin Scarlett (uncle)

Robert Campbell Scarlett, 2nd Baron Abinger DL (5 September 1794 – 24 June 1861), was a British barrister-at-law and politician.

== Background and early life ==
Born in London, he was the oldest son of James Scarlett, 1st Baron Abinger, and his first wife, third daughter of Peter Campbell. In 1844, he succeeded his father as baron. Scarlett was educated at Trinity College, Cambridge, where he graduated with a Bachelor of Arts in 1815, and a Master of Arts three years later, when he was called to the bar by the Inner Temple.

In 1837, Lord Abinger was the presiding exchequer judge in the case of Priestley v Fowler which introduced the now abandoned legal rule of common employment.

== Political career ==
In 1835, he entered the British House of Commons, representing Norwich until 1838. He sat again for Horsham from 1841 until 1844, when his father died. Scarlett was appointed Deputy Lieutenant of Inverness-shire in 1854.

== Family ==
He married Sarah Smith, second daughter of George Smith, Chief Justice of Mauritius, in 1824, and they had at least one son, William, who succeeded his father as third Baron.

Parliament of the United Kingdom
Preceded by Viscount Stormont; Sir James Scarlett	Member of Parliament for Norwich; 1835–1838; With: Viscount Stormont 1835–1837; Marquess of Douro 1837–1838	Succeeded by Marquess of Douro; Benjamin Smith
Preceded by Robert Henry Hurst	Member of Parliament for Horsham; 1841–1844	Succeeded by Robert Henry Hurst
Peerage of the United Kingdom
Preceded by James Scarlett	Baron Abinger; 1844–1861	Succeeded by William Scarlett
