= James Yorke Scarlett =

British Army officer (1799–1871)

General The Honourable Sir James Yorke Scarlett GCB
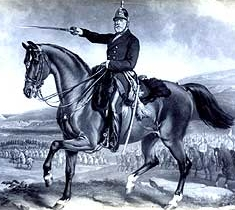
- Born: 1 February 1799; London, England
- Died: 6 December 1871 (aged 72); Burnley, Lancashire, England
- Spouse: Charlotte Anne Hargreaves (m. 1835)
- Relatives: James Scarlett, 1st Baron Abinger (father); Robert Scarlett (brother); Peter Campbell Scarlett (brother); William Anglin Scarlett (uncle)
- Military career
- Allegiance: United Kingdom
- Branch: British Army
- Rank: General
- Commands: 5th Dragoon Guards; South-West District; Aldershot Division
- Conflicts: Crimean War
- Awards: Knight Grand Cross of the Order of the Bath

General Sir James Yorke Scarlett GCB (1 February 1799 – 6 December 1871) was a British Army officer who served in the Crimean War. He led the Charge of the Heavy Brigade during the Battle of Balaclava on 25 October 1854.

== Early life ==
The second son of the Conservative polician 1st Baron Abinger, he was born in London and educated at Eton and Trinity College, Cambridge. In 1835, he married Charlotte Anne Hargreaves, a coal heiress from Burnley, the town becoming his adopted home.

== Career ==
Scarlett entered the army in 1818, as a cornet in the 18th Hussars; in 1830, he became a major in the 5th Dragoon Guards, whose Colonel was Sir John Slade (1762-1859). Slade served in the Peninsular War, where he was described as an officer of 'limited ability, lacking initiative and nearly useless' and 'that damned stupid fellow.' Combined with Slade's age, this resulted in Scarlett's appointment as Commanding Officer of the regiment in 1840, a post he held for nearly fourteen years. In 1854 he was close to retirement after an uneventful career during which he had not seen any active service. In this he was typical of the senior ranks of the British cavalry at the time, other than those posted to India.

=== Crimean War ===
In April 1854 Colonel Scarlett was appointed Brigadier-General of the Heavy Brigade of Cavalry, under Lord Lucan, Commander of the Cavalry Division. The 5th Dragoon Guards formed part of Scarlett's Heavy Brigade which was sent to the Black Sea in 1854. There it suffered heavily from cholera in the camps of Varna.

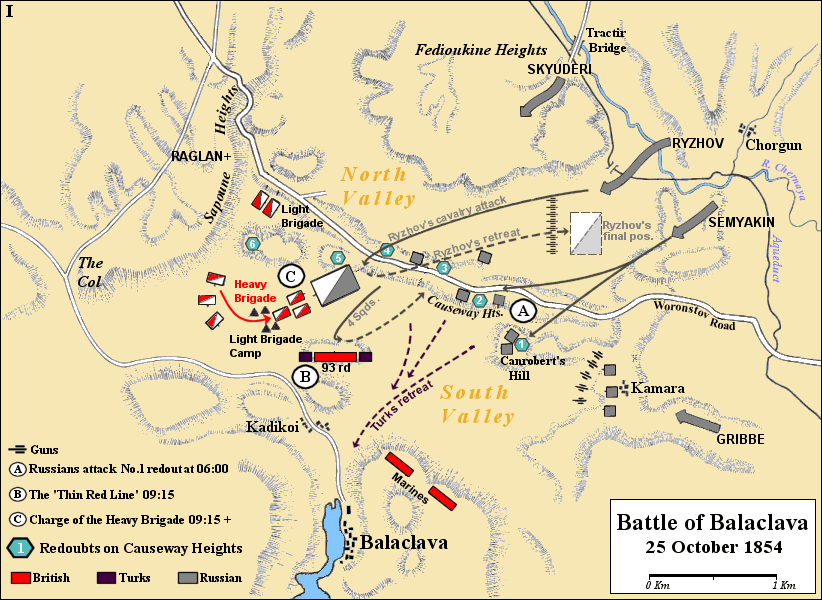
Battle of Balaclava. Russian cavalry attacks over the Causeway Heights

During the Battle of Balaclava on the morning of 25 October 1854, the Russians had stormed a series of hills known as the Causeway Heights beyond which lay the "Valley of Death" where the Earl of Cardigan would lead the Light Brigade in one of the great military blunders of the nineteenth century.

Lord Raglan ordered Scarlett to move eight squadrons of his brigade back to Kadikoi, to support the 93rd Highlanders defence of the British base at Balaklava. As Scarlett led his column of the Heavy Brigade across the sprawling tented camp of the Light Brigade, a Russian cavalry force of approximately 2000 was spotted just 800 yards from their left flank, at the top of the heights.

The 55-year-old Scarlett quickly assembled just 300 of his Inniskillings and Scots Greys at the foot of the heights, organising them into parade-perfect formation, and sounded the charge. As onlookers watched from the rear, Scarlett led his red-clad "Heavies" into the centre of the grey mass of Russians. His attack was soon followed by rest of the column (the remainder of the Inniskillings and the 4th, and 5th Dragoon Guards). Even the two squadrons of 1st Royal Dragoons who had remained behind to hold the Brigade's original position attacked on their own initiative. This action became known as the Charge of the Heavy Brigade and caused the enemy formation to collapse completely. The Russians were routed and retreated across the heights into the valley that would soon be the scene of the Light Brigade charge. Although successful, it defied military doctrine of the time, as the Russians were more numerous and, more importantly, the charge was made uphill against an oncoming force.

Cardigan had observed the action with his "Lights" from a short distance away, and had he used his initiative and chosen this moment to finish what Scarlett had started, the Charge of the Light Brigade might well have been remembered as a success. Later when Cardigan finally led his men into the valley, the Earl of Lucan, Scarlett and the Heavies waited in reserve. Scarlett had started to advance in the hope of salvaging something from the disaster when Lucan, fearing the complete loss of the Light Brigade, sounded the retreat.

=== After Balaclava ===
For his services that day Scarlett was promoted major-general and in 1855 was made KCB. After a brief period of leave in England, he returned to the Crimea with the local rank of lieutenant-general to command the British cavalry. Following the Peace of Paris, Scarlett commanded the cavalry at Aldershot until 1857, was Lieutenant-Governor of Portsmouth and General Officer Commanding South West District from 1857 to 1860 and then Adjutant-General to the Forces from 1860 to 1865. In this capacity he accompanied Queen Victoria and Prince Albert at the Royal Volunteer Review in Holyrood Park in Edinburgh on 10 August 1860 where 22,000 soldiers paraded before a crowd of over 100,000.

He was made commander of the Aldershot Division, a post he held until his retirement in 1870. He had been made a GCB in 1869.

=== Politics ===
From 1837 until 1841 he was a Conservative Member of Parliament (MP) for Guildford. In retirement Scarlett again became involved in politics, standing for election to Parliament in Burnley at the 1868 general election, but was narrowly beaten by the Liberal candidate.

== Later life ==
Scarlett died at his Bank Hall estate in Burnley, Lancashire, in December 1871, aged 72. He is buried at Church of St John the Divine, Holme Chapel, Cliviger, near Burnley. An estimated 60,000 people lined the streets of the Lancashire town for his funeral procession.

== Character ==
While lacking direct military experience at the outbreak of the Crimean War, Brigadier Scarlett selected his aides-de-camp from able officers who had seen active service in India, and followed their advice. This was in marked contrast to other generals such as Cardigan, who for reasons of social snobbery looked down on "Indian officers". Described as being brave, modest and sensible, Scarlett won popularity amongst the Heavy Brigade. An officer of the Light Brigade of Cavalry commented "Good kind old fellow that he is, they are all very fond of him and will follow him anywhere".

== Memorials ==
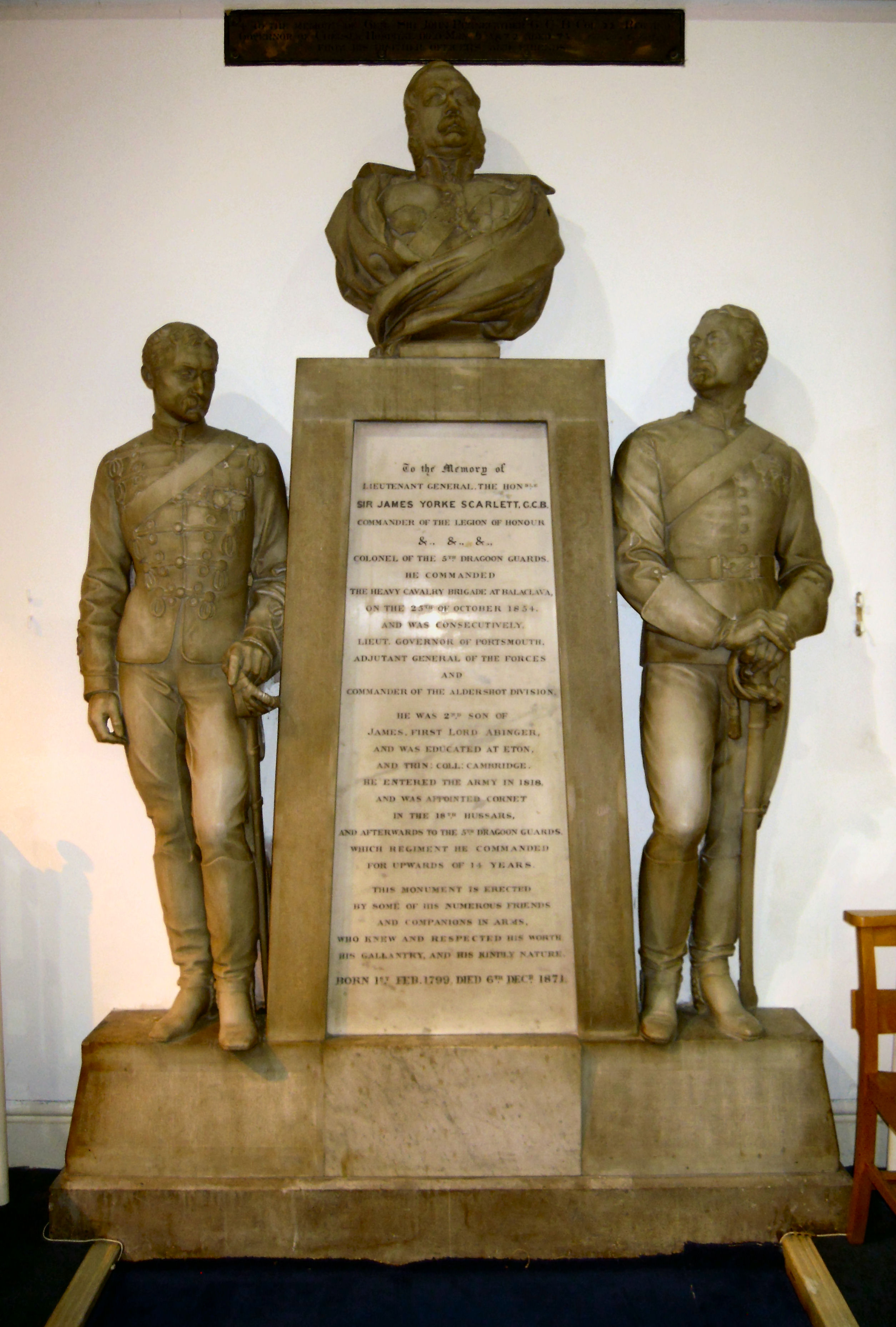
Memorial to Scarlett in the Royal Garrison Church at Aldershot

A memorial to Scarlett was installed in the Royal Garrison Church at Aldershot. It includes a marble bust of Scarlett flanked by two full-size marble cavalry troopers of his former regiments, the 18th Hussars and 5th Dragoon Guards, wearing VCs, four-bar Crimean War medals and Long Service and Good Conduct medals.

There is also a memorial plaque to Scarlett in St James's Church, Abinger Common, Surrey.

The brewery tap at Burnley's Moorhouse's Brewery is named in his honour.

== In fiction ==
Scarlett appears as a character in Flashman at the Charge (1973) by George MacDonald Fraser, which includes a fictionalised version of the Charge of the Heavy Brigade. He is portrayed as an inexperienced military commander, yet none-the-less charismatic and effective.

He is depicted in the 1968 film The Charge of the Light Brigade by Leo Britt.

Parliament of the United Kingdom
Preceded by James Mangles; Charles Baring Wall	Member of Parliament for Guildford; 1837–1841; With: Charles Baring Wall	Succeeded by Ross Donnelly Mangles; Charles Baring Wall
Military offices
Preceded by Henry Breton	GOC South-West District; 1857–1860	Succeeded by Lord William Paulet
Preceded by Sir George Weatherall	Adjutant General; 1860–1865	Succeeded by Lord William Paulet
Preceded by The Earl of Cardigan	Colonel of the 5th Dragoon Guards; 1860–1871	Succeeded by Richard Parker
Preceded by Sir John Pennefather	GOC-in-C Aldershot Division; 1865–1870	Succeeded by Sir James Grant
