= Peter Campbell Scarlett =

British diplomat

- Born: 1 February 1799
- Died: 6 December 1871 (aged 72); London, England
- Education: Eton College
- Spouses: Frances Sophia Mostyn (m. 1843; died 1849) Louisa Anne (m. 1873)
- Children: 3
- Father: James Scarlett, 1st Baron Abinger
- Relatives: Robert Scarlett (brother); James Yorke Scarlett (brother); William Anglin Scarlett (uncle)

Peter Campbell Scarlett CB, DL (27 November 1804 – 15 July 1881), styled The Honourable from 1830, was a British diplomat.

== Background ==
Scarlett was the youngest child of James Scarlett, 1st Baron Abinger and his wife Louise Henrietta Campbell, daughter of Peter Campbell. His older brother was Robert Scarlett, 2nd Baron Abinger and his older sister Mary Campbell, 1st Baroness Stratheden. He was educated at Eton College.

== Career ==
Scarlett served successively as attaché at the British embassies in Constantinople from 1825, then in Paris from 1828 and finally Rio de Janeiro from 1834. He was sent to Florence as secretary of legation in 1844, later acting as chargé d'affaires. In 1854, he was awarded a Commander of the Order of the Bath and was appointed Envoy Extraordinary and Minister Plenipotentiary to Brazil in the end of 1855. Despite his stay abroad, Scarlett received a commission as Deputy Lieutenant for Surrey in the following year.

After three years in Brazil, he was transferred in December 1858 as Envoy Extraordinary and Minister Plenipotentiary to the Grand Duke of Tuscany until 1859, when following the occupation by Kingdom of Sardinia, the grand duchy was abolished. Scarlett became Envoy Extraordinary and Minister Plenipotentiary to the King of Greece in 1862, a post he held for the next two years. In 1864, he was nominated Envoy Extraordinary and Minister Plenipotentiary to the Emperor of Mexico and retired in 1867.

== Family ==
He married Frances Sophia Mostyn, second daughter of Edmund Lomax, on 22 May 1843 and had by her two sons and a daughter. She died in 1849 and Scarlett remarried Louisa Anne, daughter of James Murray, Lord Cringletie, and widow of Edward Jeannin, on 27 December 1873. This second marriage was childless. Scarlett died at London in 1881 and was survived by his wife who died on 19 March 1900.

== Works ==
- South America and the Pacific; Comprising a Journey Across the Pampas and the Andes, from Buenos Ayres to Valparaiso, Lima, and Panama; with Remarks upon the Isthmus. To which are Annexed Plans and Statements for Establishing Steam Navigation on the Pacific; (1838)
- A Memoir of the Right Honorable James, First Lord Abinger, Chief Baron of Her Majesty's Court of Exchequer; (1877)

Diplomatic posts
Preceded by Henry Francis Howard	Envoy Extraordinary and Minister Plenipotentiary to the Emperor of Brazil; 1855–1858	Succeeded by Hon. Francis Reginald Forbes
Preceded by The Lord Lyons	Envoy Extraordinary and Minister Plenipotentiary to the Grand Duke of Tuscany; 1858–1859	Post abolished
Preceded by Thomas Wyse	Envoy Extraordinary and Minister Plenipotentiary to the King of Greece; 1862–1864	Succeeded by Hon. Edward Erskine
Preceded by Charles Lennox Wyke	Envoy Extraordinary and Minister Plenipotentiary to the Emperor of Mexico; 1864–1867	Vacant No diplomatic relations after end of French intervention in Mexico Title next held by Sir Spenser St John
