= Brown v. Kendall =

American legal case

- Court: Supreme Court of Massachusetts
- Full case name: George Brown vs. George K. Kendall
- Decided: October 1850
- Citation: 60 Mass. 292, 6 Cush. 292

Court membership
- Judge sitting: Lemuel Shaw

Case opinions
- reversed the judgment in favor of the claimant and ordered a new trial

Brown v. Kendall, 60 Mass. 292 (1850), was a case credited as one of the first appearances of the reasonable person standard in United States tort law.

== Factual background ==
Two dogs, belonging to the plaintiff and the defendant, respectively, were fighting and in the process of trying to break up the fight the defendant hit the plaintiff in the eye with a stick. In the trial court, the defendant requested that instructions be given to the jury about contributory negligence and a standard resembling the reasonable person standard, but the judge declined to give the instructions. The jury rendered a verdict for the plaintiff, and the defendant appealed.

== Decision ==
The court reasoned that the defendant should only be liable if he was at fault. Fault should be determined by whether or not the defendant was acting with "ordinary care and prudence," a formulation of the reasonable person standard. The court determined that the lower court should have considered this standard when determining negligence and ordered a new trial.
