= Sidney Bartlett =

American lawyer and politician (1799–1889)

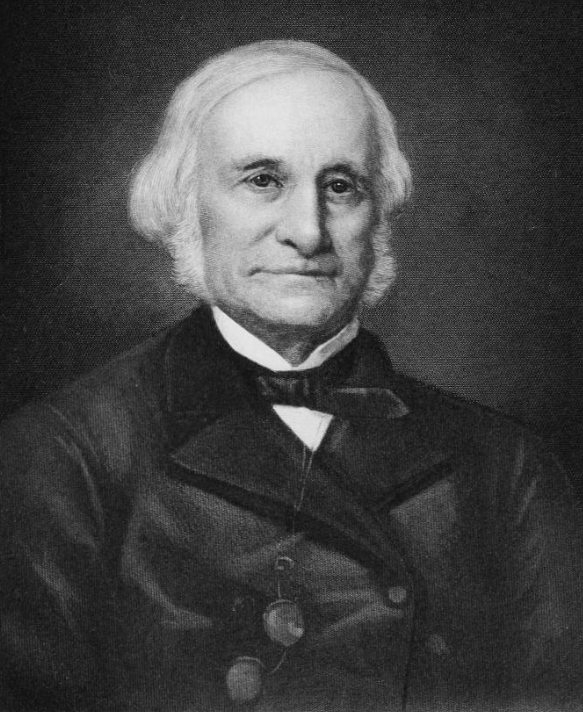
Sidney Bartlett

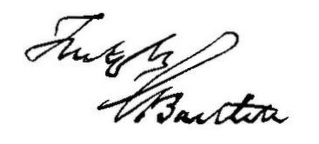

Sidney Bartlett (February 13, 1799 – March 6, 1889) was an American lawyer and politician in Massachusetts.

Bartlett served as a member of the Massachusetts General Court in 1851, and in 1853 he represented Boston as a delegate to the state constitutional convention.

== Early life, education, and career ==
Born in Plymouth, Massachusetts, to Zaccheus Bartlett and Hannah Bartlett, he was a lineal descendant of Robert Bartlett, who settled at Plymouth in the early colonial period. Bartlett was educated at the public schools in Plymouth, and graduated from Harvard College in 1818, at the age of 19. After leaving college, he taught school in Scituate for a short time, and then spent a year in Plymouth reading law in the office of Nathaniel Morton Davis. During that time, he was a private in a recently organized military company called the Standish Guards. In 1820, Bartlett continued reading law with Hon. Lemuel Shaw to gain admission to the bar in Boston on October 2, 1821. He then entered into a legal partnership with Shaw, which continued until Shaw was appointed Chief Justice of the Supreme Judicial Court in 1830.

The Green Bag published the following anecdote about Bartlett's meticulous habits as a lawyer:

One incident related of Mr. Bartlett was of such a character that it ought to be impressed upon the minds not only of all lawyers, but also of all literary men, of artists, and, in fact, of every one who aspires to do a superior piece of work in the world. "Once," said the friend of Mr. Bartlett who told the story, "I saw him, at the end of a long evening's labor, throw into the fire a bundle of manuscript, his brief in a very important and difficult suit, saying, 'There goes the third brief that I have made in this case.'" An ordinary man thinks when he has made one conscientious effort that he need require no more of himself, but the master spirits put the mark so high that it is only just within their reach.

Bartlett was recognized by the Supreme Court of the United States as one of the ablest lawyers who argued causes before it.

== Political service and later life ==
Bartlett served as a member of the Massachusetts General Court in 1851, and in 1853 he represented Boston as a delegate to the state constitutional convention, but other than these two points of service he "scrupulously avoided what may be called public life". In 1858 Harvard conferred upon him the degree of LL.D.

Bartlett continued arguing cases until shortly before his death at the age of 90.

At the time of his death in 1889, Bartlett was reported to have an annual legal practice worth $100,000 (equivalent to approximately $3.6 million in 2025).

== Personal life and death ==
Bartlett "enjoyed the pleasures of life to a great degree". In his early life he greatly enjoyed fishing, and before Martha's Vineyard became a fashionable resort, he often went there to fish with his close friend Judge Curtis. He was fond of young people and their ways, and enjoyed reading not only the law, but history, biography, the sciences, and, above all, the popular novels of the day.

On October 8, 1828, Bartlett married Caroline Pratt, with whom he had a son, Francis. From the time of his admission to the bar, Bartlett always lived in Boston, where he died at the age of 90.
