= Fouldes v Willoughby =

1841 English tort law case

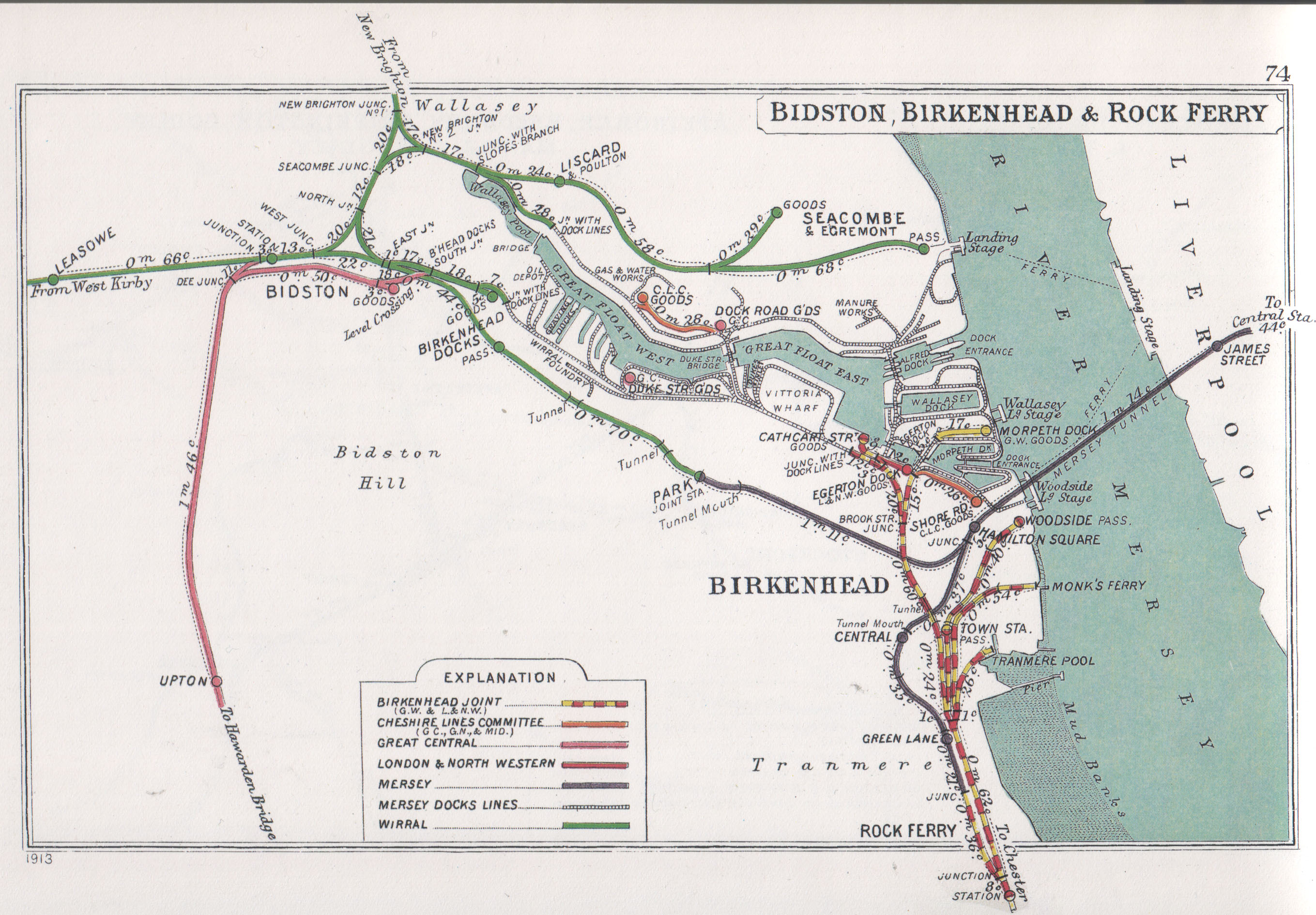
- Court: Exchequer Court
- Citations: (1841) 8 M&W 540, 151 ER 1153, (1841) 1 Dowl NS 86, (1841) 5 Jur 534, (1841) 10 LJ Ex 364

Court membership
- Judges sitting: Lord Abinger CJ, Rolfe B

Keywords
- Conversion

Fouldes v Willoughby (1841) 8 M&W 540 is a leading English law case on the tort of conversion.

== Facts ==
The owner of two horses had come on board a ferry from Birkenhead to Liverpool. The ferryman refused to carry the horses. The owner refused to take them back on shore, and so the ferryman took the bridle from the owner turned the horses loose at the landing. The owner stayed put on board, and did not try to get the horses back. He sued the ferryman for conversion.

The judge at the trial told the jury that the defendant ferryman, by taking the horses from the plaintiff and turning them out of the vessel, had been guilty of a conversion. The ferryman appealed.

== Judgment ==
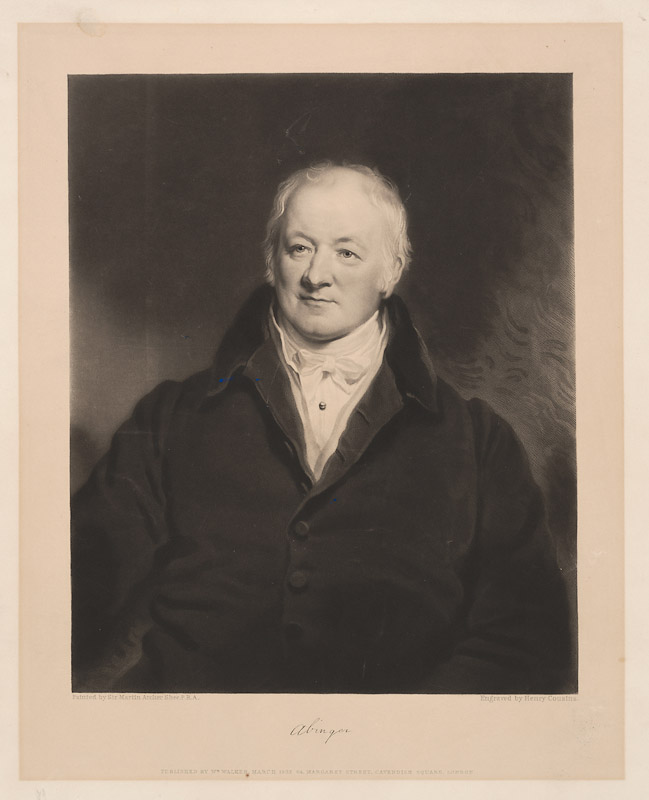
Lord Abinger CJ gave the leading judgment.

The Exchequer Court held that the ferryman was not guilty of conversion, because there was no interference with the plaintiff's "general right of dominion" over the horses. “In my opinion,” said Lord Abinger CJ,

“he should have added to his direction, that it was for them to consider what was the intention of the defendant in so doing. It is a proposition familiar to all lawyers, that a simple asportation of a chattel, without any intention of making any further use of it, although it may be a sufficient foundation for an action of trespass, is not sufficient to establish a conversion. It has never yet been held that the single act of removal of a chattel, independent of any claim over it, either in favour of the party himself or any one else, amounts to a conversion of the chattel.”

Rolfe B gave a now well recognised definition of conversion that it is,

"a taking with the intent of exercising over the chattel an ownership inconsistent with the real owner's right of possession".

Instead, the ferryman was liable for trespass. It would only be conversion if the ferryman had actually used the horse.

== See also ==
- Trover
- English tort law
