= Royal Garrison Church, Aldershot =

Royal Garrison Church
- The Royal Garrison Church of All Saints
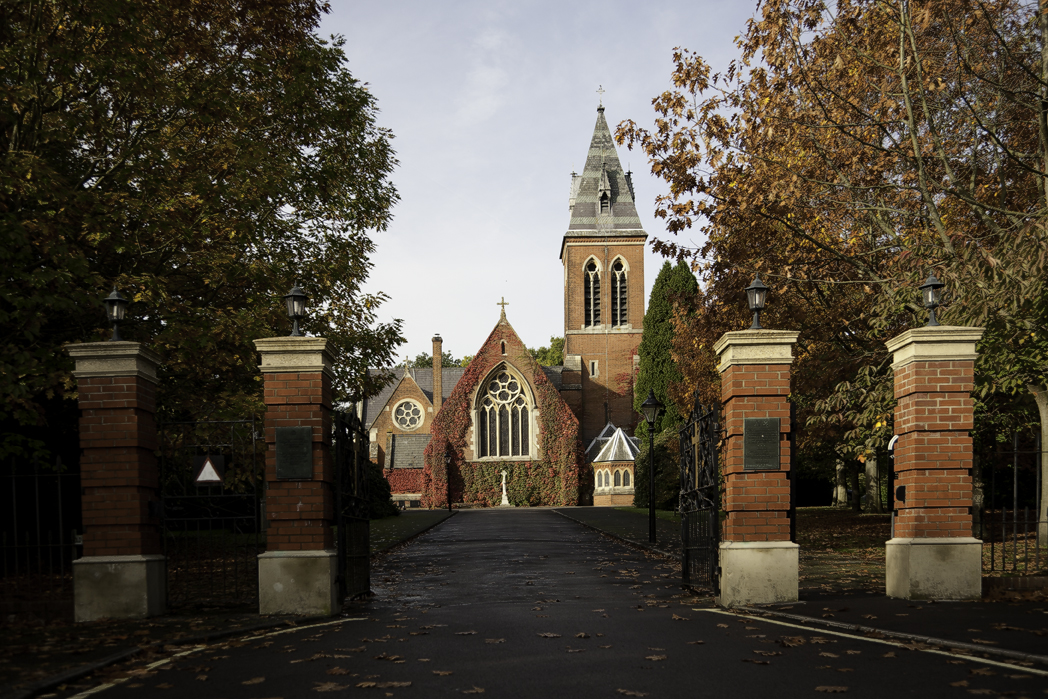

- Location within Hampshire
- 51°15′08″N 0°46′44″W
- OS grid reference: SU 85326 51036
- Location: Farnborough Road; Aldershot, Hampshire; GU11 1QA
- Country: England
- Denomination: Church of England
- Churchmanship: Central

Architecture
- Functional status: Active
- Heritage designation: Grade II listed
- Designated: 1973
- Architect: P. C. Hardwick
- Style: Gothic Revival

Specifications
- Materials: English bond red brick

Administration
- Diocese: Jurisdiction: Bishop to the Forces; Location: Diocese of Guildford

Listed Building – Grade II
- Official name: Royal Garrison Church of All Saints
- Designated: 29 March 1973; Amended 4 February 1999
- Reference no.: 1339672

Royal Garrison Church of All Saints is a Church of England church in Aldershot Garrison, England. It was built in 1863 and designed by the architect P. C. Hardwick. The building is constructed in the Gothic Revival style using English bond red brick, hence its nickname of "the Red Church". It is the 'home' church for the Anglican military personnel serving in Aldershot. It is a Grade II listed building.

== History of the Garrison Church ==
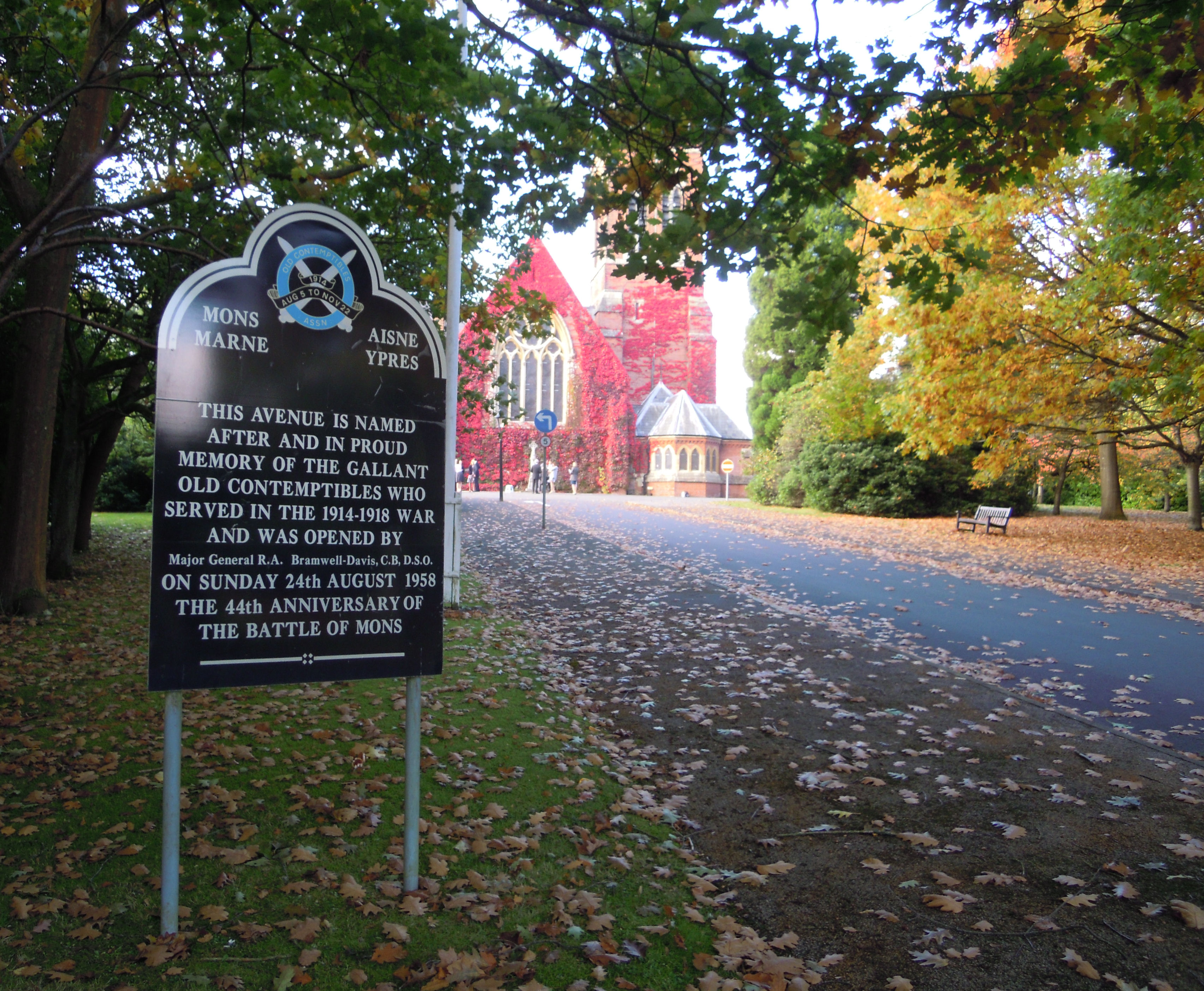
The Church is approached by way of Old Contemptibles Avenue

In January 1854 some 25,000 acres of Aldershot Heath were purchased with the view to setting up a permanent military camp in the area. The outbreak of the Crimean War later in the same year led to a military mobilisation and in 1855 12,000 huts were constructed in the Aldershot area to house the 20,000 militia who had been called up.

It was soon apparent that the size of camp that Aldershot had become by this time would need a church, so a small iron building was commissioned; this was the only church in the camp at Aldershot from 1855 until 1863 and was on the site now occupied by the Garrison Church of St Andrew on Queens Avenue. When Parliament decided to make Aldershot a permanent Camp in 1857 a new site was chosen for the building of a permanent garrison church near to the Royal Pavilion. The architect was Philip Charles Hardwick (1822-1892), who designed a red-brick structure in the Gothic revival style. The Church measures 143 feet in length and is 68 feet wide and can seat 1,250 worshippers. The spire is 170 feet tall and is a local landmark. It was consecrated by Charles Richard Sumner, Bishop of Winchester, on 29 July 1863. The church is a Grade II listed building.

Today the church is approached by way of Old Contemptibles Avenue, so named after the Old Contemptibles who attended an annual service at the church for many years and who would then parade out of the Church along this avenue and down to Wellington Avenue opposite. The avenue was opened by Major-General Ronald Bramwell-Davis, General Officer Commanding Aldershot District on 24 August 1958, the 44th anniversary of the Battle of Mons.

The Royal Army Dental Corps chapel is in the south west corner of the Church with an altar frontal in green with embroidered past and present badges of the Corps thereon. St Michael's Chapel - the Warrior's Chapel - is surrounded by a very fine screen.

== Key events ==
- 1914 George V and Queen Mary attended Matins on 19 May
- 1923 The King allows the word "Royal" to be added to the church's name
- 1963 Elizabeth II attends the centenary service
- 1976 The funeral of General Sir Mervyn Andrew Haldane Butler KCB, CBE, DSO, MC, Commander-in-Chief of Strategic Command of the British Army from 1970 to 1971 is held in January.

== The Somme Cross ==
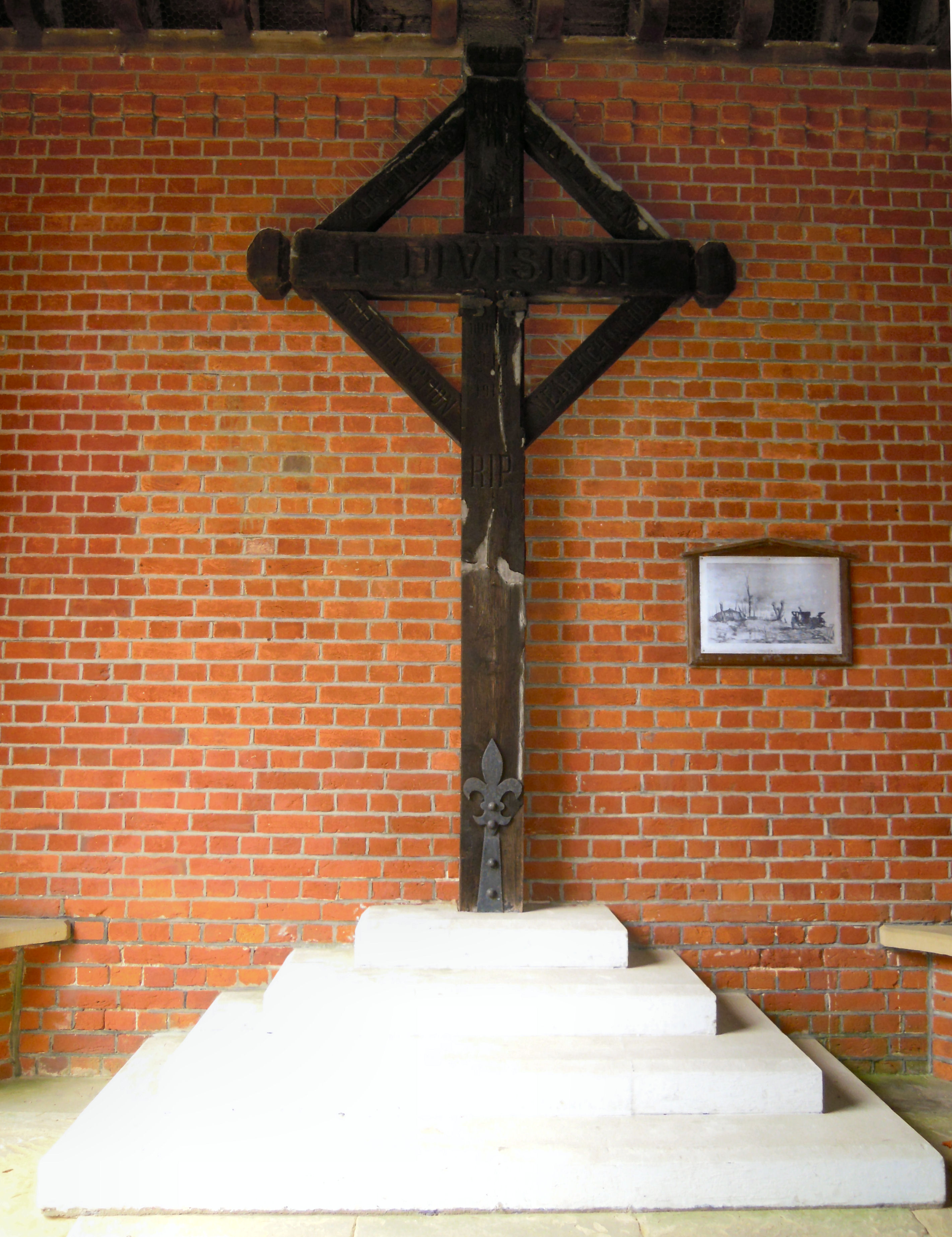
The Somme Cross

Located in the south porch is a large cross, about nine feet high and made of dark wood. The inscription on the cross reads: "In memory of the Officers, SNCO's and Men of 1st Division killed in action near High Wood during September 1916 - RIP".

On the outbreak of the First World War, the 1st Division was based in Aldershot but within weeks was in action at the Battle of Mons. In July 1916 the 1st Division was in action during the Battle of the Somme at the Battle of Bazentin Ridge (14-17 July) and then at the Battle of Pozières (23-26 July) where they attacked the German second line of defence.

The 1st Division went into action at High Wood in September 1916 and over the next few days saw some of the bloodiest hand-to-hand fighting during the Battle of the Somme which left the trenches thick with British and German dead. After the battle the 1st Division engineers put up a memorial cross at High Wood using wood taken from the ruins of Bazentin village. As after the War there was a permanent stone memorial to the 1st Division at Le Cateau the cross at High Wood had to be removed or left to decay; instead, it was brought back to the UK.

The cross was re-erected in 1927 outside the 1st Division Headquarters in Pennefather's Road in Aldershot. In January 1939, to protect it from the elements, the Somme Cross was moved from Pennefather's Road into the south porch, which then became the 1st Division Porchway and where it has remained ever since.

== Furnishings ==
=== The Great East Window ===
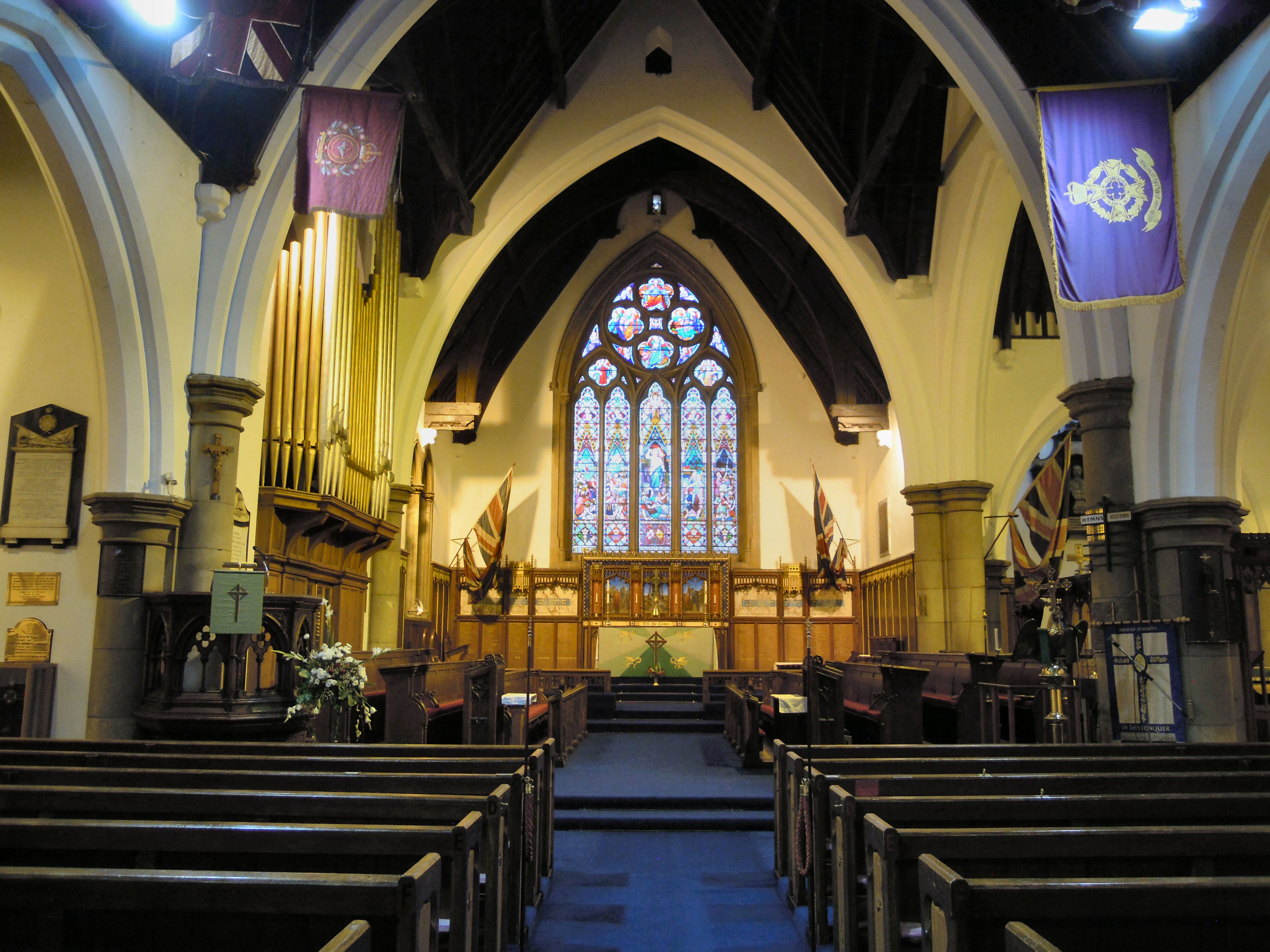
The Chancel showing the Great East Window

The biggest stained glass window in the church, it was commissioned by the 37th Hampshires to commemorate the officers, non-commissioned officers and men of the regiment who had been killed during the Indian Mutiny of 1857 to 1859. It was designed in the Geometric style of architecture as found in churches built during the period c.1307-1337. The central panel shows the Resurrection with Christ emerging victorious from his tomb carrying a flag to symbolise his victory over death. The two panels on the left show Joshua while the two on the right depict Gideon.

=== The Altar ===
Both the main altars at the east end of the church are of wood and were originally without any form of hangings. The carving on the front of the main altar is very fine; it was presented to the Church by the All Saints Branch of the Guild of St Helene. The various frontals and hangings used on the altar throughout the Church Year have been received from various donors.

=== The Organ ===
The organ was built by Brindley and Foster in 1900, and is the second instrument to stand in the Church. It has 1749 pipes and three manuals and pedals and eighteen speaking stops, with provision for another twenty-two stops which have subsequently been added plus an additional three. The gilded pipes on the north aisle screen are only dummies, and are not connected to the organ in any way.

=== The Pulpit ===
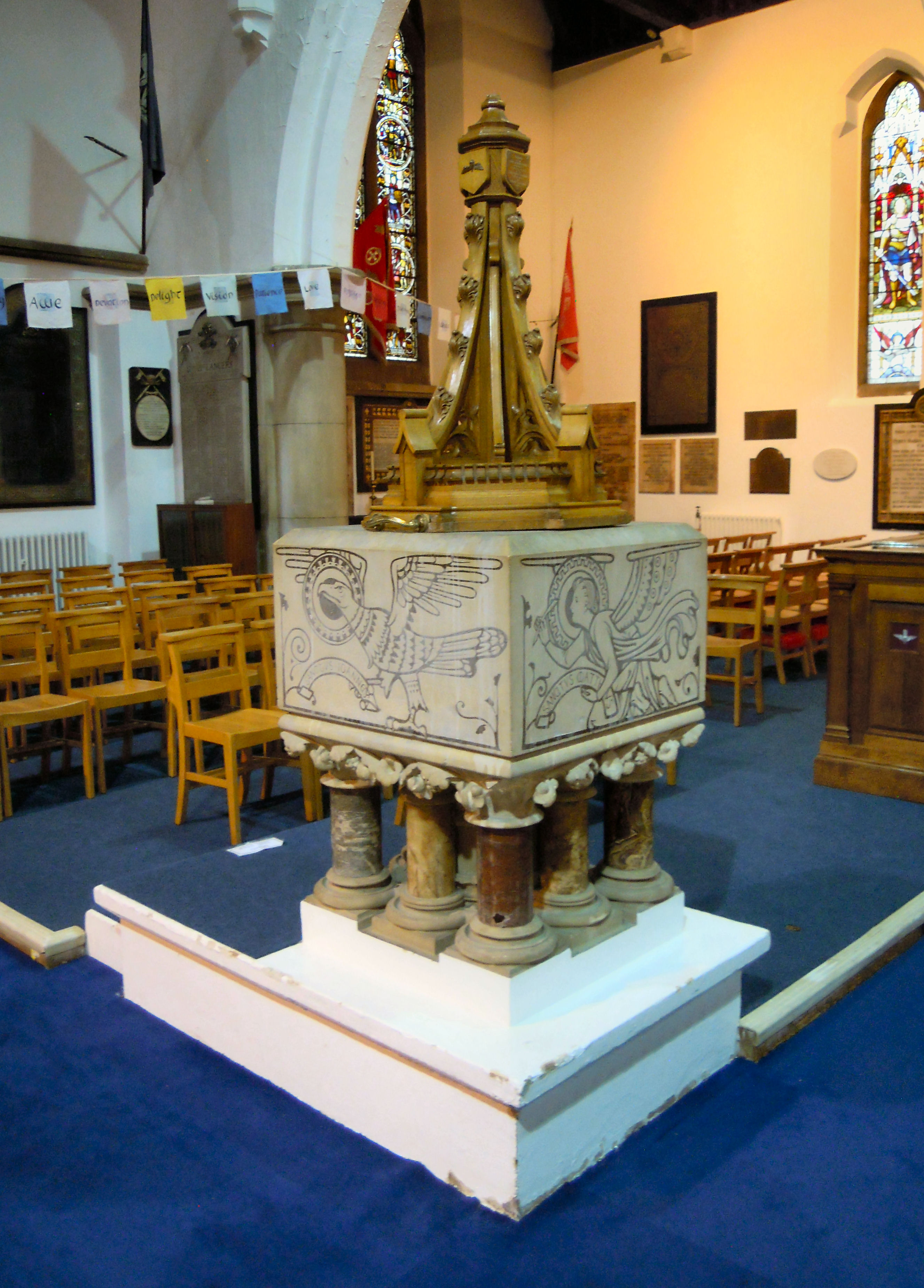
The font

The carved oak pulpit is a memorial to Sir James Alleyn, RA and dates to 1899. In the four quatrefoils at the base of the pulpit are the traditional symbols of the Four Evangelists: the eagle for St John; the lion for St Mark; the bull for St Luke, and the angel for St Matthew.

=== The Font ===
The font is rather plain and heavy in design but is unusual in that, unlike most fonts, it is square in shape. On the outside are the symbols of the Four Evangelists with their names in Latin: Sanctus Joannes, Sanctus Marcus, Sanctus Lucas and Sanctus Mattheus.

=== The Parachute Regiment Kneelers ===
Since 1967 the church has been the "spiritual home of The Paras". All the soldiers from the regiment who died during World War II are remembered with their own individual kneeler.

=== Wall memorials ===
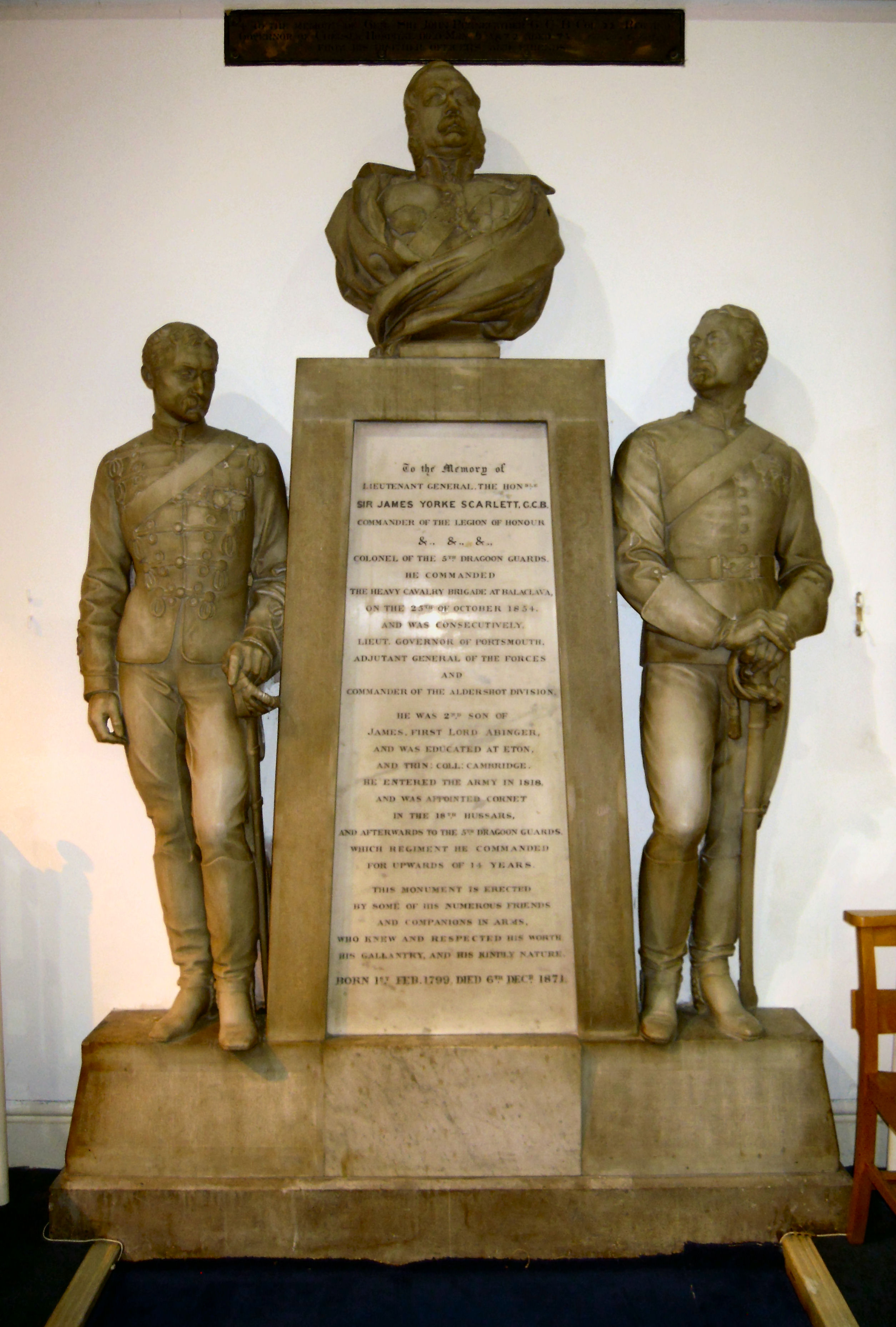
Memorial to James Yorke Scarlett

There are many eminent soldiers commemorated: among them Frederick Arthur Montague Browning, James Yorke Scarlett, James Hope Grant, Henry Renny, Henry Jenner Scobell and Neil Douglas Findlay

Scarlett's memorial includes a bronze bust of Scarlett flanked by two full-size bronze cavalry troopers of his former regiments, the 18th Hussars and 5th Dragoon Guards, wearing VCs, four-bar Crimean War medals and Long Service and Good Conduct medals.

== Gallery ==
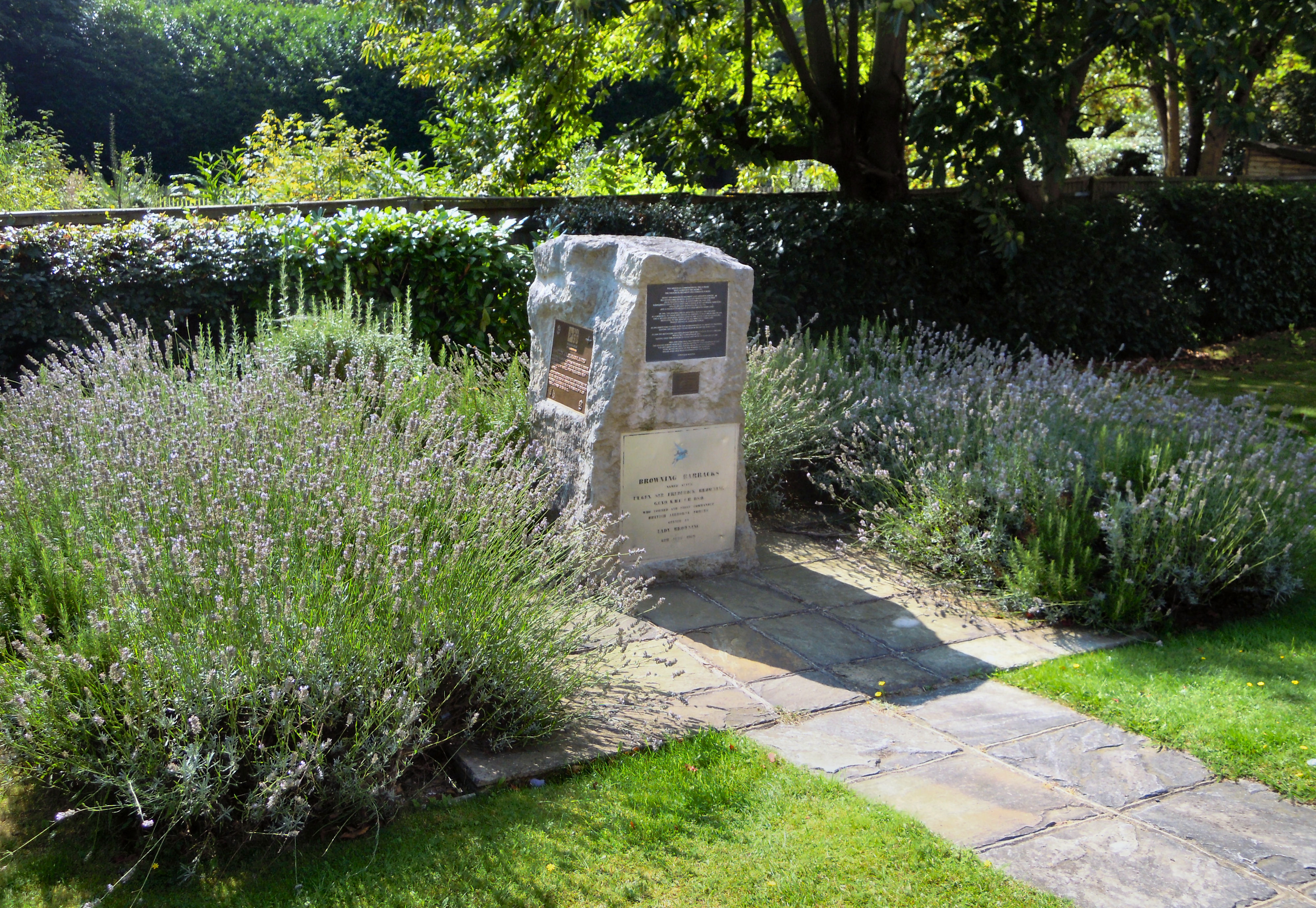
Memorial to the Parachute Regiment and Airborne Forces

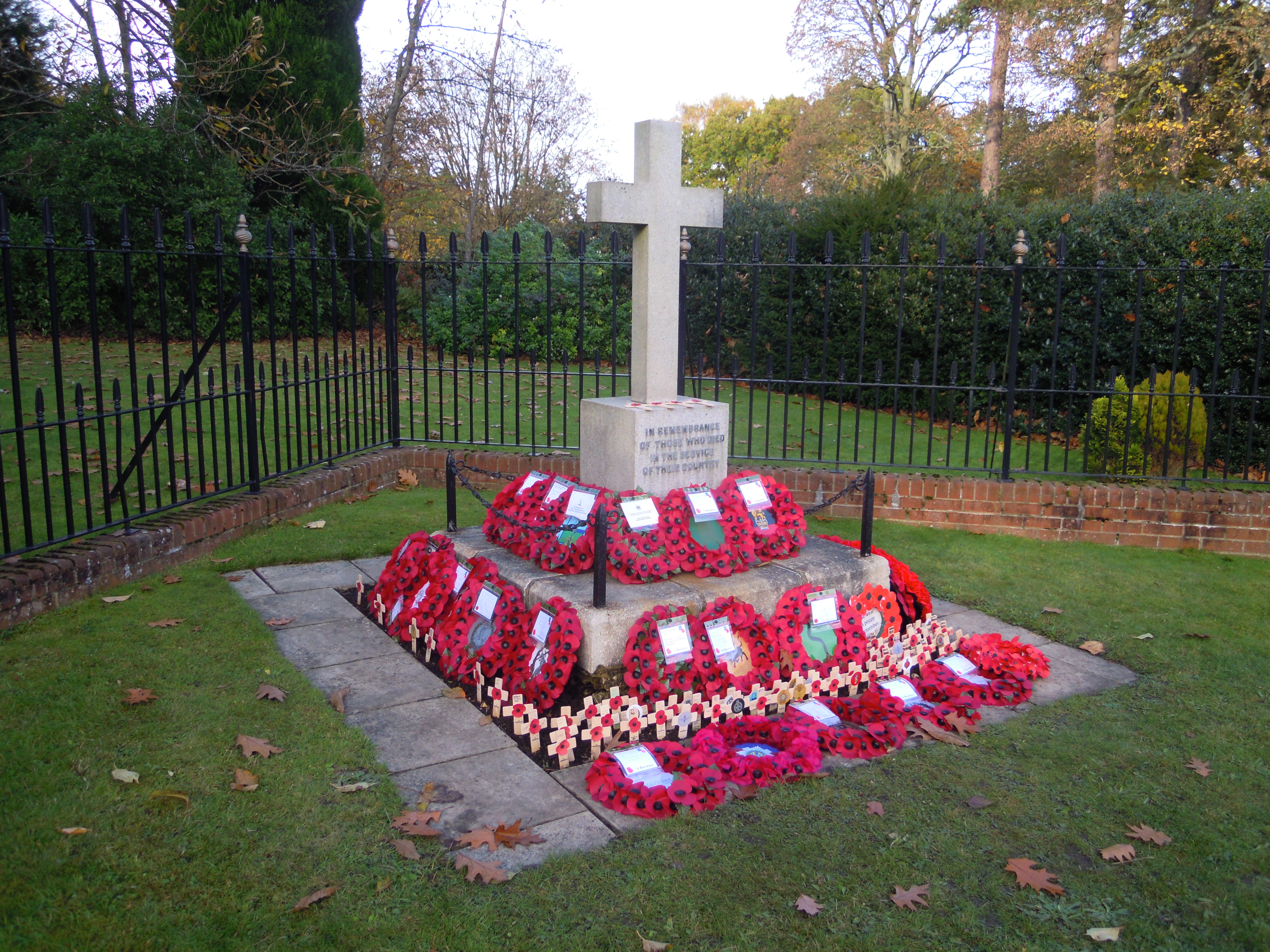
Small memorial outside the Church in November 2016

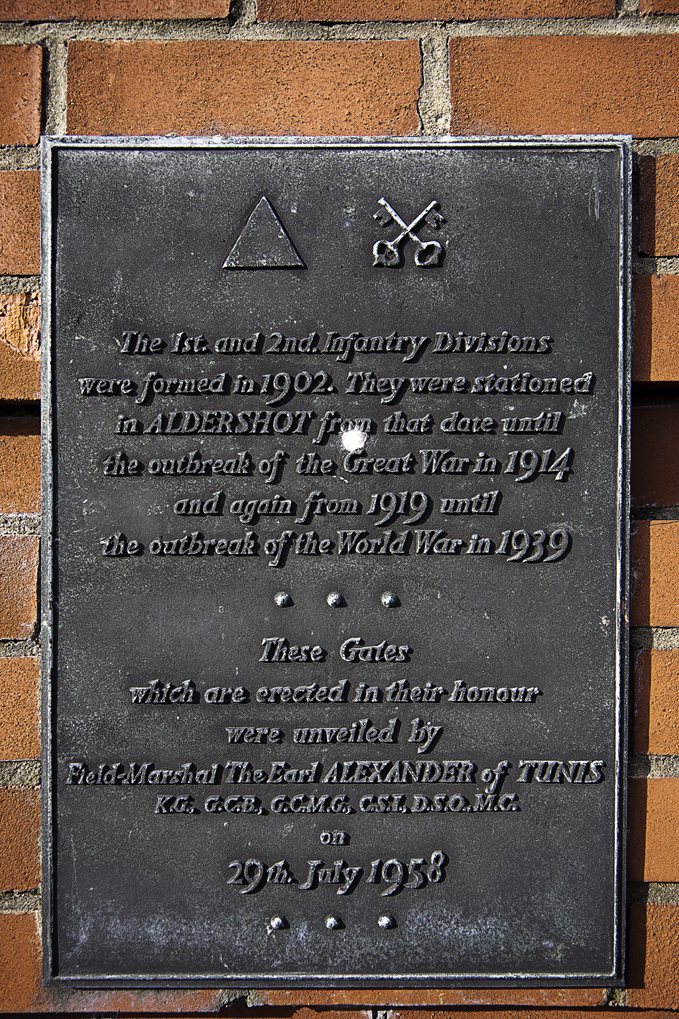
1st and 2nd Infantry Division Gates
