= Farwell v. Boston & Worcester Railroad Corp. =

- Court: Massachusetts Supreme Judicial Court
- Citation: 4 Met. 49 (Mass. 1842)

Holding
- A master is not liable for injuries to a servant, caused by the negligence of a fellow servant engaged in the same general business, where the master has furnished proper appliances, and has not been negligent in the selection of fellow employees.

Case opinions
- Decision by: Chief Justice Lemuel Shaw

Keywords
- Fellow servant rule

Farwell v. Boston & Worcester R.R. Corp, 45 Mass. 49 (Mass. 1842), Massachusetts Chief Justice Lemuel Shaw used a contract rationale to prevent a railroad worker from recovering from his employer, Boston and Worcester Railroad, for an injury due to the negligence of a switch tender employed by the same company, even though a third party or passenger would likely have been able to recover for the same injury. Shaw believed that the injured worker was in an equally good—if not better—position to oversee the work of his coworkers than his employer had been. It followed that to allow Farwell to recover compensatory damages would have been to create a moral hazard in the workplace, softening the blow of employee carelessness for those best able to prevent it.

This created the fellow servant rule. In the years and decades that followed, courts in Massachusetts and elsewhere in the United States developed a panoply of doctrines that made it exceedingly difficult for industrial workers to go to law for insurance against the risks of their work. Employees were said to assume the ordinary risks inherent in the workplace. And where an employee's own negligence (no matter how slight) contributed to his injury, he was barred from recovering damages, even from a negligent employer. The contributory fault doctrine connected the law of work risks to a much broader array of nineteenth-century legal rules that limited the law's risk-spreading capacity. People entering onto someone else's land were owed only a limited duty of care, and sometimes no duty of care at all.

The Farwell opinion has been seen by some scholars as providing the financial stability necessary to secure the success of an infant railroad industry.

== Held ==
- The mere incompetency of a fellow servant is insufficient to render the master liable for his negligent acts, absent a showing that the master knew of such incompetency, and was negligent in continuing to employ him.
- A master is not liable for injuries to a servant, caused by the negligence of a fellow servant engaged in the same general business, where the master has furnished proper appliances, and has not been negligent in the selection of fellow employees.
- Employees engaged in the same general business are fellow servants, though they are in different departments of work.
- The liability of a master for injuries to a servant, caused by the negligence of a fellow servant, is not dependent on the ability of the injured servant to influence the acts and conduct of the negligent servant.
- An engineer in the employ of a railroad company cannot recover for injuries caused by the negligence of a switch tender, who is employed by the same company, since they are fellow servants.
- A person entering the service of another assumes all risks naturally incident to that employment, including the danger of injury by the fault or negligence of a fellow servant.
- A railroad company employed A., who was careful and trusty in his general character, to tend the switches on their road; and, after he had been long in their service, they employed B. to run the passenger train of cars on the road, B. knowing the employment and character of A. Held, that the company were not answerable to B. for an injury received by him, while running the cars, in consequence of the carelessness of A. in the management of the switches.

== See also ==
- Fellow servant rule
