= William Anglin Scarlett =

Sir William Anglin Scarlett
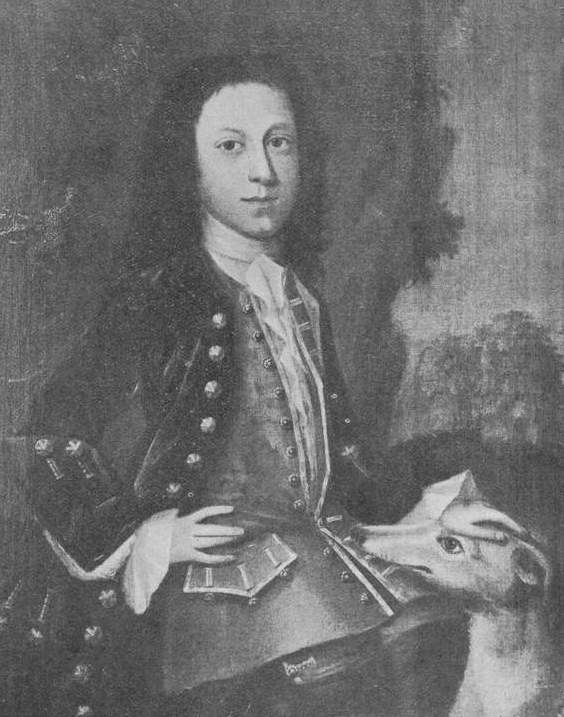
- Born: 1777
- Died: 1831 (aged 53–54)
- Education: Trinity College, Cambridge (BA)
- Occupation: judge
- Known for: Chief Justice of Jamaica
- Spouse: Mary Williams (m. 1809)
- Children: 2
- Relatives: James (brother); Robert Scarlett (nephew); James Yorke Scarlett (nephew); Peter Campbell Scarlett (nephew)

Sir William Anglin Scarlett (1777–1831) was Chief Justice of Jamaica known for his love of justice.

== Early life ==
Scarlett was the son of Robert Scarlett who owned property in Jamaica. His elder brother, James, was to become Attorney General. He was educated in Edinburgh and at Trinity College, Cambridge, where he graduated Bachelor of Arts in 1802.

== Career ==
Scarlett became Chief Justice of Jamaica in 1821. In 1823, Scarlett presided over the trial of a man on a charge of libel brought by the Duke of Manchester, the Governor of Jamaica. The man was acquitted, but even as a Chief Justice, Scarlett was abused as he left the court.

He was involved again in another case where he opposed the governor. Scarlett released prisoners but they were rearrested and exiled from Jamaica. Scarlett's decision was in time upheld by the British Parliament.

The case began when Louis Celeste Lecesne and John Escoffery were arrested on 7 October 1823 under the Alien Act by a warrant of the Duke of Manchester, the Governor of Jamaica. They were considered by the Attorney General, William Burge to be of a dangerous character and to be aliens as they were claimed to be Haitians. Luckily they had time to raise a writ of Habeas Corpus in the Supreme Court of Jamaica

Scarlett released them, but it took Parliament to uphold his decision. Scarlett was knighted in 1829.

== Personal life ==
In 1809, Scarlett married Mary Williams of Luana estate in St. Elizabeth. He had two sons, Robert William and James Williams Scarlett.

== Death ==
Scarlett died in 1831. His obituary noted that he had been ill and that even his detractors noted his "love of justice". His wife died the following year.
