= Common employment =

Common employment was an historical defence in English tort law that said workers implicitly undertook the risks of being injured by their co-workers, with whom they were in "common employment". The US labor law terminology was the "fellow servant rule".

== Development ==
The operation of the doctrine was seen first in Priestly v Fowler in the United Kingdom. In the United States the doctrine was seen in Farwell v. Boston & Worcester R.R. Corp.

Bunker Hill Mining Company operated by the fellow servant doctrine. According to Katherine Aiken, "persons engaged in the same common pursuit for the same employer were fellow servants and companies were not liable for injuries where a fellow servant was at fault. Thus, either the miner himself or his coworker was ultimately responsible for accidents." Between March 1893 and February 1894, 15 fatalities occurred at the mine.

== Abolition ==
As Australia experienced a relatively influential labour movement in the late 19th and early 20th century, statutory compensation was implemented very early in Australia. Each territory has its own legislation and its own governing body.

William Ralph Meredith was instrumental in creating the workers' compensation system in Ontario, Canada.

It was abolished altogether by the Law Reform (Personal Injuries) Act 1948 in the United Kingdom.

The doctrine has been superseded in the United States by worker's compensation laws, by which a worker can file for a quasi-tort, regardless of their co-worker's fault.

== See also ==
- Contributory negligence
- Volenti non fit injuria
- Ex turpi causa non oritur actio
- Albro v. Agawam Canal Co.(1850)
