= Priestley v Fowler =

English labor law case

- Court: Court of Exchequer
- Citations: [1837] 150 E.R. 1030, (1837) 3 Mees & Wels 1

Court membership
- Judges sitting: Park, J. and Lord Abinger

Keywords
- Tort, common employment, freedom of contract

Priestley v Fowler [1837] 150 ER 1030 is an old English tort law case, which introduced the old rule of common employment (or "fellow servant rule" in the United States). This is idea that the employer is not liable for injuries caused by one employee to another in the course of their employment. The rule was removed in its entirety in the United Kingdom by the Law Reform (Personal Injuries) Act 1948.

Despite this, there was no allegation by the plaintiff in this case "about the act of any fellow servant or indeed any suggestion that the duty sought to be put on the employer was other than a primary duty to ensure that the van was a safe conveyance."

== Facts ==
On 30 May 1835 Charles Priestley, a servant of butcher Thomas Fowler of Market Deeping, was ordered to deliver mutton to market. The meat was placed in a wagon driven by William Beeton, another of Fowler's employees. Priestley was to accompany the cart only as far as Buckden, some twenty miles from Peterborough, where he was to sell some quantity of the loaded provisions. Beeton would then continue on to London to vend the remainder.

The four-horse team could not move the van and "jibbed," meaning that they stopped in their tracks and would not move forward. Turning to the nearby Fowler, Beeton protested that "he ought to be ashamed of himself for sending such a dangerous load." Fowler responded by calling Beeton "a damned fool for saying anything of the sort." Although present during the exchange, Priestley held his peace. Following this ominous start, the wagon soon embarked on its journey, propelled into motion by some of Fowler's other employees.

Nearing Peterborough, Beeton and Priestley heard a cracking noise as the cart rolled over some stones. Consequently, they had the van inspected by Gideon Lucas, owner of the King's Head Inn. The perusal, conducted by lantern light because they had departed Market Deeping at nine thirty at night, revealed nothing amiss with the cart. Nevertheless, while traversing the mile south from Peterborough towards Norman Cross, the wagon's front axle cracked along a third of its length and gave way, overturning the vehicle. Beeton was pulled ahead of the van's collapse by the horses, escaping substantial harm. Priestley was less fortunate: some four hundredweight worth of mutton fell on him, resulting in a broken thigh, a dislocated shoulder, and various other injuries.

As was customary upon the occurrence of such accidents, Priestley was taken to the closest public lodging, in this case the King's Head Inn from which he and Beeton had recently departed. Lying "in a very precarious state," Priestley remained at the inn for nineteen weeks, during the course of which he was treated by two surgeons. Exactly what happened during this convalescence period remains open to conjecture, but the total cost of Priestley's care and treatment, a hefty £50, was paid by his father, Brown Priestley.

== Judgment ==
During the Lincoln Summer Assizes of 1836, Charles Priestley (as a minor through his father) sued his master Fowler for compensation relating to his accident.

On 18 July 1836 the action was tried before Park, J., who by all accounts was a sound judge, although given to occasional losses of temper. Serjeant Edward and Mr. Nathaniel Clarke represented Priestley, while Serjeant John Adams and Mr. Andrew Amos acted as counsel for Fowler.

=== Pleadings ===
Priestley pleaded two grounds in support of his claim against his master, a latent defect and the van's overloading. The declaration stated that when Fowler had "directed" the plaintiff to accompany the mutton to market "in" the van, Fowler was under a duty "to use due and proper care that said van should be in a proper state of repair" and "not be overloaded, and that the plaintiff should be safely and securely carried thereby." As a result of Fowler having breached this duty, the van had broken down and the plaintiff was harmed. No allegation was made as to negligent actions or omissions, nor of the existence or violation of a duty towards Charles Priestley by anyone in Fowler's employ.

=== Trial ===
Throughout the trial, Serjeant Goulbourne emphasised the over-loading claim, with contrary evidence presented by the parties as to the weight both properly and actually borne by the wagon. Evidence was also given as to the extent of the axle's defect prior to the accident. In putting Priestley's case to the jury, Goulbourne played to their sympathies, remonstrating the unprincipled behaviour of the "wealthy butcher" defendant towards the plaintiff who "was one of a large family," and asking for not only reimbursement of medical expenses, but also recompense for Priestley's pain and suffering:That a very opulent tradesman, a man in a very large way of business like the defendant, should have driven this poor lad into court, for he would say that not only justice, but also in common humanity, he ought to pay the pecuniary damages his client had sustained, and also some remuneration for the suffering he had undergone, and the deprivation under which he was now labouring and would labour for the rest of his days.

Opposing the claim, Serjeant Adams denied that the cart had been overloaded, noting that Priestley had continued on the journey after first witnessing Beeton's protest, and then hearing the cart crack near Peterborough. Nor could Fowler be held liable, Adams continued, as he was only bound to use "such ordinary care and diligence as he would use over himself," and the defendant had been satisfied as to the state of his property. In any event, Serjeant Adams asserted that as a legal matter, Fowler as a master was not liable to his servant Priestley. This was because there was "no such case in the books," and for good reason: "If the defendant was responsible in this case, every master was liable to any accident that might occur to his servant about his work." No evidence reveals the possible negligence of Priestley's fellow servants ever being raised or at issue during the trial.

=== Judge rulings and jury verdict ===
Without identifying a related judgment, Park, J. disagreed with Adams's contention "that there is no such case on the books," and refused to nonsuit the plaintiff, opining that "the defendant is liable." At the same time, he pointed out that the jury could consider Priestley's acquiescence in light of the wagon's condition, and granted Adams permission to move the full court in Westminster should the jury enter a verdict against his client. Next, instructing the jury, Park, J. stated that Fowler could not be held liable for a hidden defect in the wagon. Instead the only question here was,--and it was one of fact—was the van shamelessly overladen; was it laden unsafely and to a dangerous degree; and, if so, was the master acquainted with the fact? . . . if the jury were of opinion that the accident was occasioned by the 'pigheadedness' of the defendant in over-loading the van they would find for the plaintiff.

After deliberating for less than half an hour, the jury awarded Charles Priestley a sizeable £100.

=== Exchequer Chamber ===
During the following Michaelmas Term of 1836, Serjeant Adams obtained a rule to arrest the judgment on the ground "that there was nothing in the declaration to throw any liability on the master." Adams also moved for a new trial, but this part of the rule was abandoned when Fowler became bankrupt. As a result, the arguments presented on 16 January 1837 before the full Court of Exchequer were confined solely to the motion in arrest of judgment.

Showing cause, Serjeant Goulbourne began by conceding that a probable issue was whether Priestley had been required to ride in the van, or had been at liberty to walk alongside it. Such concern was vitiated when the Court of Exchequer intimated the sufficiency of the declaration on this subject. Next, after acknowledging that the suit was "a case of the first impression" without "precedent exactly in point," Goulbourne declared that the action was "maintainable on general principles of law," analogising Priestley's situation to that of "an ordinary coach passenger." To this, Abinger, C.B. raised the distinction that a coach passenger had no means of knowing the coach's condition, whereas a servant could make his own inspection. Serjeant Goulbourne averred that as in the coach/passenger situation, the master/servant relationship was contractual. The servant paid consideration with his labour, and the master was in turn duty bound "not to expose him to risk in performing these services." Because the jury had found for the plaintiff, two inferences had to be "intended," or drawn. First, that "it was the master's duty to provide a proper vehicle," and second, "that the master knew the van was overloaded."

Plaintiff's counsel concluded his averments by arguing that even if brought in assumpsit, the action would have alleged the same basis for recovery because the law implied a promise "co-extensive" to the violations of duty alleged under case in the declaration. In response, the Chief Baron opined that liability would exist in those circumstances if either the master had "maliciously designed" to injure his servant, or he had "positively guaranteed" his safety. Seizing upon this opening, Serjeant Goulbourne stated that after the verdict "it will be intended that the master was aware of the danger, and that he denied to the servant that there was any danger." Parke, B. then posed a hypothetical: "Suppose I send my servant on the roof, to clear away the snow; if the roof gives way am I liable?" Serjeant Goulbourne replied that the present case differed because "it is not a mere state of insufficiency; for the overloading of the cart is a positive act, which occasions the accident." At no point during the repartee did either Serjeant Goulbourne or the Exchequer Barons touch on the likelihood of Priestley's injury originating from the oversight of a fellow servant.

In arrest of the judgment, Serjeant Adams contended that the plaintiff had improperly framed his action in case rather than in assumpsit. This error was dispositive, for in order to maintain an action, five circumstances had to exist: First, that the van was overloaded, by defendant's order. Second, that plaintiff was ignorant of its being overloaded. Third, there must be an order by the defendant, to plaintiff, to go on the van. Fourth, that it was necessary for the plaintiff to do so, in order to perform his duty in respect of the goods. And, fifth, that the order shall be a lawful command which the servant is bound to obey.

The action having raised three of Adams's prerequisites to liability, the Barons of the Exchequer engaged defendant's counsel in a protracted discussion of whether Priestley was required to ride in the wagon or could have walked alongside it, then intended that the declaration was sufficient on this point. Serjeant Adams concluded his advocacy by proclaiming that "there is nothing in the declaration which shews that this was anything more than a mere accident; and for a mere accident which happens in a master's service, the master is not responsible." As with the arguments presented by his opposing counsel, Adams never raised the prospect of vitiating his client's liability due to the intervening act of a fellow servant.

Instead of rendering a decision on the day of argument, the Court of Exchequer reserved judgment, presenting its opinion on 23 November 1837. For the Court, Lord Abinger, C.B. delivered a rambling opinion arresting the judgment. The Chief Baron began by dismissing as a matter of law the assertion that Fowler's knowledge of overloading could be intended after verdict. The only issue to be decided was both narrow and clear: whether "the mere relation of master and servant" implied a common-law duty "on the part of the master, to cause the servant to be safely and securely carried." Lacking "precedent for the present action," the Court was at "liberty to look at the consequences of a decision the one way or the other."

Deciding "the question upon general principles," Abinger, C.B. cautioned that if legal culpability was upheld under these circumstances "the principle of that liability will be found to carry us to an alarming extent." He then put forward a number of examples in dicta illustrating the magnitude to which such a rule would cause principals to be responsible to their "inferior agents": If the owner of the carriage, therefore, is responsible for the sufficiency of his carriage to his servant, he is responsible for the negligence of his coach-maker, or his harness-maker, or his coachman. The footman, therefore, who stands behind the carriage, may have an action against his master for a defect in the carriage, owing to the negligence of the coach-maker, or for a defect in the harness arising from the negligence of the harness-maker, or for the drunkenness, neglect, or want of skill in the coachman.

Even more distressing to Lord Abinger was that the rationale of the case could be broadened further, allowing, for example, a master to "be liable to the servant, for the negligence of the chambermaid, in putting him into a damp bed." In other words, Abinger, C.B. clearly foresaw that permitting Priestley to recover directly against his master in this novel action would open the floodgates to vicarious liability, entitling servants injured by their peers to recover against their common masters. Because the consequences of such an extension would engender both "inconvenience" and "absurdity," general principles provided "a sufficient argument" against liability.

Acknowledging that the master/servant relationship bound the master directly to "provide for the safety of his servant . . . to the best of his judgment, information, and belief," the Chief Baron emphasised that it could "never" imply an obligation for the master "to take more care of the servant than he may reasonably be expected to do of himself." At the same time, the servant was "not bound to risk his safety in the service of his master" and was free to "decline any service in which he reasonably apprehended injury to himself." This was because servants were in as good, if not better positions, than their masters to appreciate possible hazards.

Lord Abinger concluded with a last policy argument against upholding the jury's verdict. Allowing this action "would be an encouragement to the servant to omit that diligence and caution which he is in duty bound to exercise on behalf of his master," and which offers much better protection against injuries "than any recourse against his master for damages could possibly afford."

== See also ==
- UK labour law
- English tort law
- Common employment
- Wilsons and Clyde Coal Ltd v English [1938] AC 57
