= Women in World War I =

Aspect of women's history

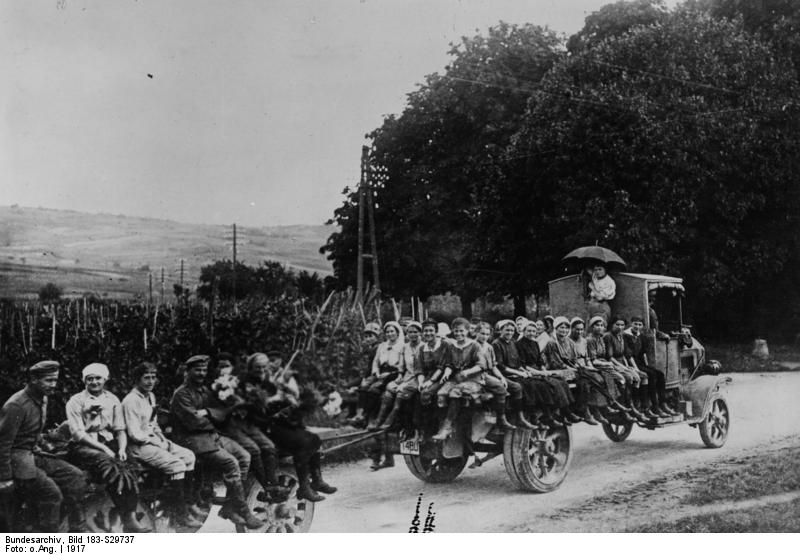
German female war workers in 1917

Women in World War I were mobilized in unprecedented numbers on all sides. The vast majority of these women were drafted into the civilian work force to replace conscripted men or to work in greatly expanded munitions factories. Thousands served in the military in support roles, and in some countries many saw combat as well.

In some countries, women undertook resistance work and espionage, work related to the medical profession, journalism and combat. Many were recognized with medals awarded by their own and other countries.

Many disguised their gender. When discovered, in countries including Germany, Serbia, and Russia they were allowed to serve openly. In Britain and France, they were generally dismissed from service.

Women working in a gas mask factory in Geneva, Switzerland

== Reasons for participation ==
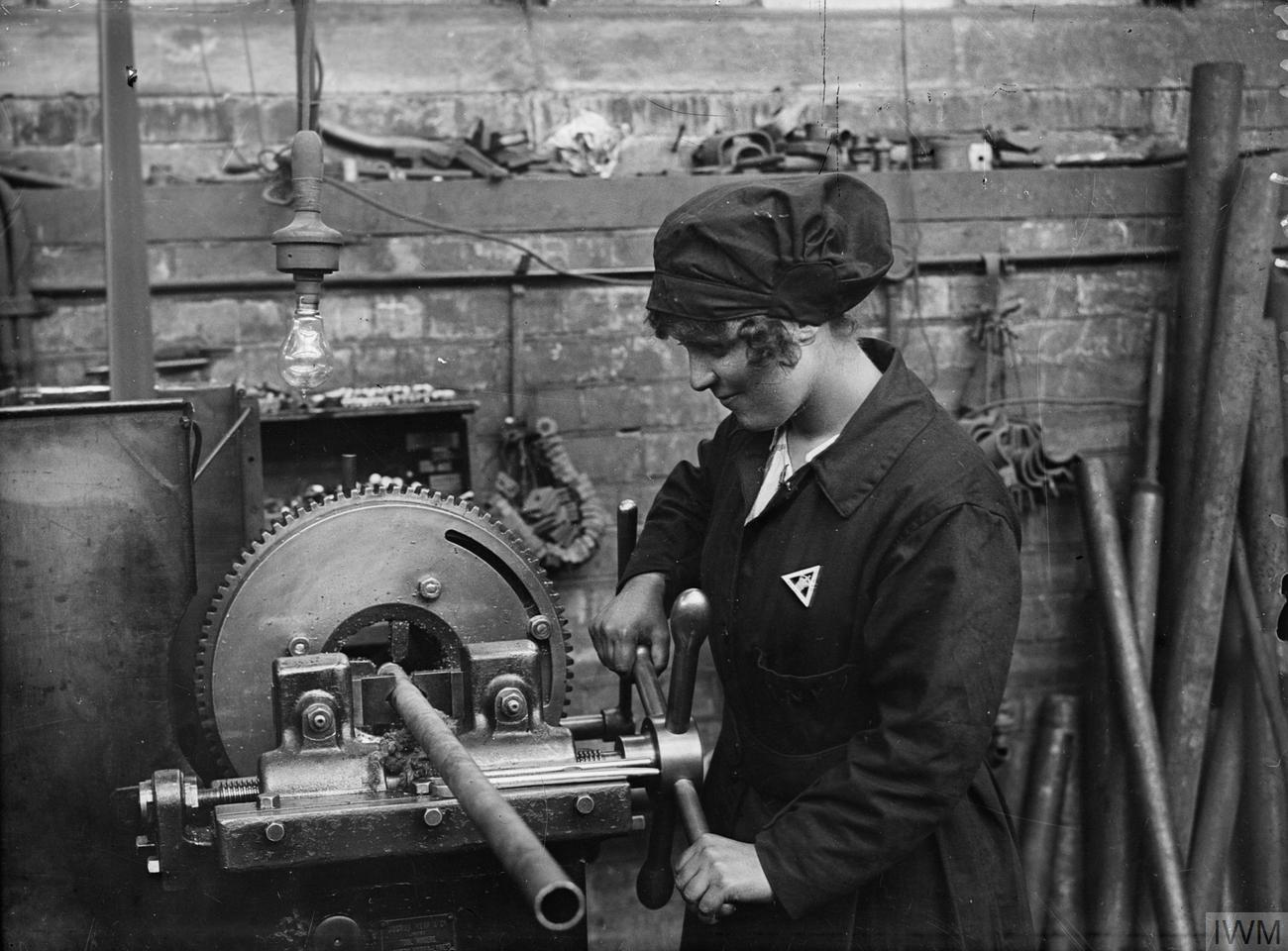
Many jobs opened up for women in fields where they had been excluded prior to the war. Here, a machinist works at an Armstrong Whitworth shipbuilding yard in Elswick, Newcastle.

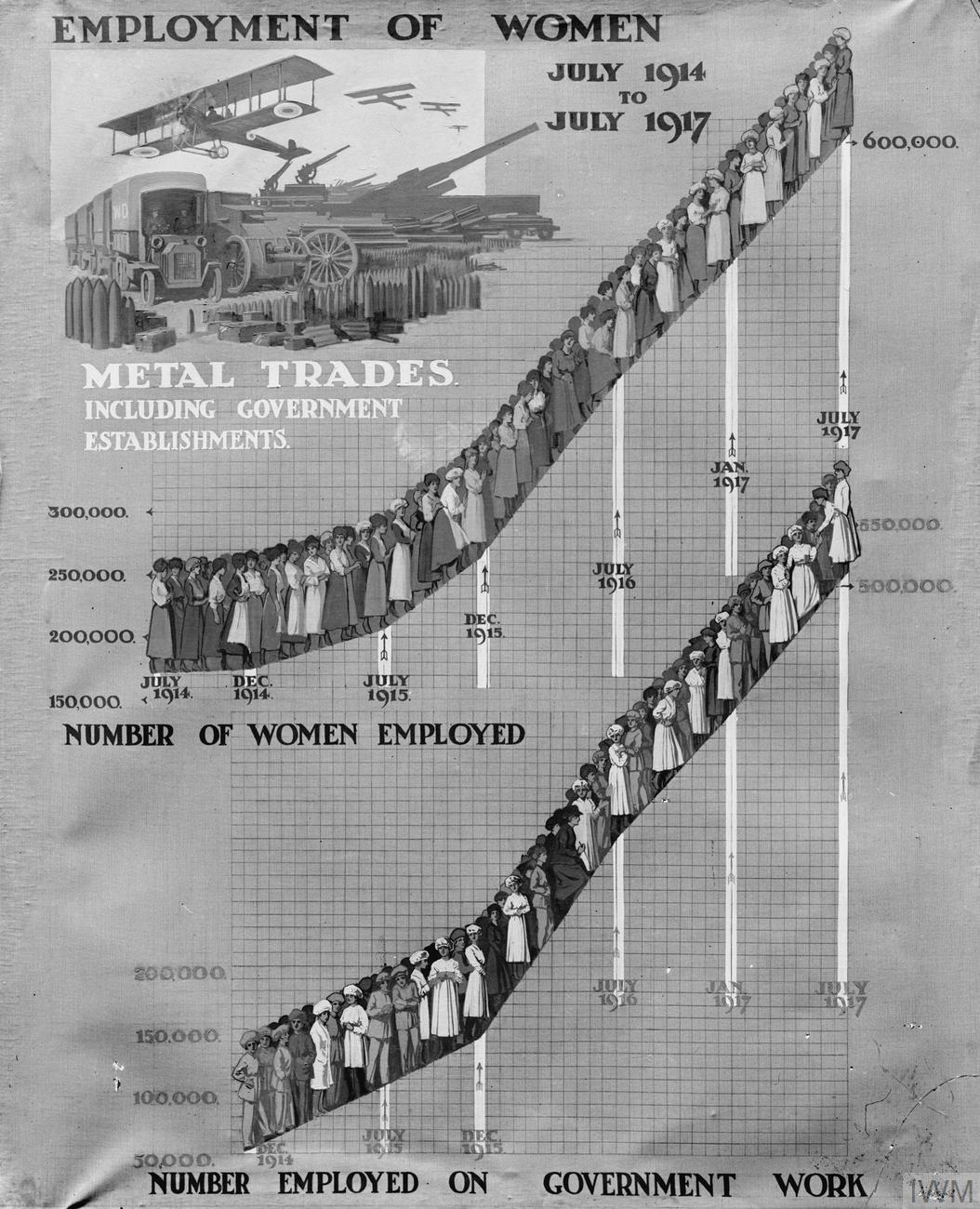
The number of the women in the labour force increased dramatically during the war

The motives of the women who actively joined the war effort were varied. Some were trying to prove their worth as supporters of loved ones in the military, while others were attracted by the idea of being useful in positions other than those considered "women's work."

Many women believed that their contribution to the war effort would help their attempts to gain the right to vote. And, in fact, the global women's suffrage movement continued to make gains during the course of the war, with Denmark and Iceland granting full suffrage to women in 1915; voting rights were also expanded the following year in Norway and Canada. In February 1918, the United Kingdom passed a major suffrage law that was considered directly related to the importance of women's participation in the war effort. After years of opposition, United States President Woodrow Wilson changed his position in 1918 to advocate women's suffrage in recognition of their services.

== Anti-war sentiment ==
Other women protested against the war and tried to persuade world leaders to end it. For example, in 1915, the International Congress of Women held a meeting commonly called the Women's Peace Congress or Women at the Hague, which was attended by more than 1,000 women in the Netherlands.

== Journalists and other writers ==
While many women who participated in the war kept diaries or notes they later published as memoirs, some female journalists went to the front lines and beyond to get stories about what was actually happening during the war. Like their male counterparts, they were subjected to close supervision and censorship, but they had even more difficulty gaining access to information they wanted for their stories.

- Mildred Aldrich was an American journalist, editor, writer and translator. In 1914, shortly before the start of World War I, she retired to a house in the French countryside overlooking the Marne River valley. She published a novel and four accounts of her life based on collections of her letters written during the war years. In 1922, she was awarded the French Legion of Honour in recognition of her assistance to soldiers and refugees and the influence her books apparently had in persuading the United States government to declare war on Germany.
- Madeleine Zabriskie Doty was an American attorney and journalist. In 1915, as a correspondent for the New York Evening Post, she attended the Women's Peace Congress, also called Women at the Hague, in the Netherlands. She was then commissioned by the New-York Tribune to report on wartime Germany. Despite not speaking the language, she made two trips to Germany, during which she met with pacifist Social Democrats. On her second trip, she saw how the Allied blockade was only leading to intense hunger among the people. Despite constant surveillance, she was allowed to join an official tour of Germany for journalists. She returned to the United States and published several articles in major publications. These were subsequently collected in a book called Short Rations: An American Woman In Germany,1915–1916, published in 1917.
- American nurse and author Ellen La Motte worked in a French hospital in Belgium to get her story. Her book The Backwash of War was published in 1916. Instead of promoting glory and heroism, the book focused on the agonizing deaths of men far from their friends and families. The book was banned in France and Great Britain but well-received in the United States until that country joined the war, when it was banned there, too.
- Dorothy Lawrence was an aspiring English journalist who wanted to be a war correspondent. In 1915, she travelled to France and posed as a male soldier working as a sapper for the Royal Engineers. After 10 days, health problems led her to turn herself in. Upon her release, she was forced to sign an affidavit agreeing not to write about her experiences. After the war, she published a book called Sapper Dorothy Lawrence: The Only English Woman Soldier (1919), but it was highly censored and not successful. In 2003, her story was rediscovered. Her autobiography was republished in 2010, and she was featured in an exhibition on women at war at the Imperial War Museum. Since 2015, several plays and films have been produced based on Lawrence's story.
- Germany in War Time: What an American Girl Saw and Heard (1917) was written and illustrated by American Mary Ethel McAuley, an artist and war correspondent for the Pittsburgh Dispatch, who spent two years in Germany during the war. Published after the United States entered the war, the book was considered much too sympathetic toward ordinary Germans and was immediately seized by the government.
- American mystery writer Mary Roberts Rinehart, a regular contributor to The Saturday Evening Post, persuaded the editor of the Post to send her to the front lines in Belgium in 1915. Based on her earlier training as a nurse, she convinced the Belgian Red Cross to give her access to the army hospitals, and she was allowed to tour the Belgian front, including no man's land. She also received permission for personal interviews with King Albert I of Belgium, his wife Queen Elisabeth, and Queen Mary of England, wife of British King George V. In addition, she interviewed Allied leaders Ferdinand Foch and Winston Churchill. Upon her return home, Rinehart wrote 10 articles for The Saturday Evening Post based on her observations. The articles were also published in The London Times and subsequently collected into a book entitled Kings, Queens and Pawns: An American Woman at the Front.

== Austria-Hungary ==
In late July 1914 the Viennese press circulated a message published by Austria's first major women's group, the Frauenhilfsaktion Wien, appealing to "Austria's women" to perform their duties to the nation and take part in the war effort. Women would be expected to provide much of the necessary manpower during this time and, depending on social class, some would even take part in the leadership of local communities in Austria. Notably, Viktoria Savs enlisted in the Austro-Hungarian Army disguised as a man and was decorated for bravery fighting on the Italian Front in the Alps. She and Stephanie Hollenstein were the only two known Austrian women on the front line.

== British Empire ==
=== In the military ===
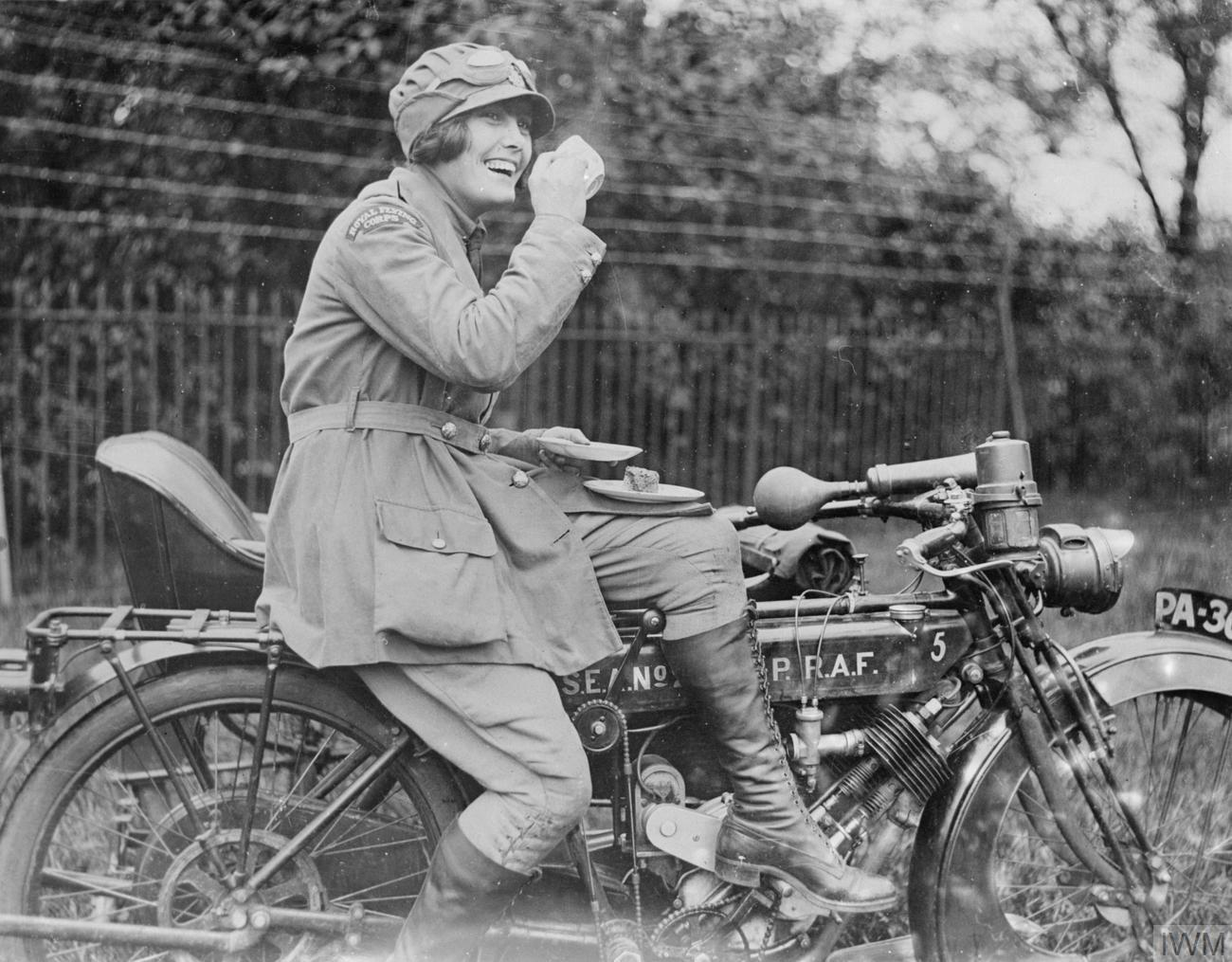
A Women's Royal Air Force (WRAF) despatch rider on a tea break, seated on her P&M 500cc single, 1918.

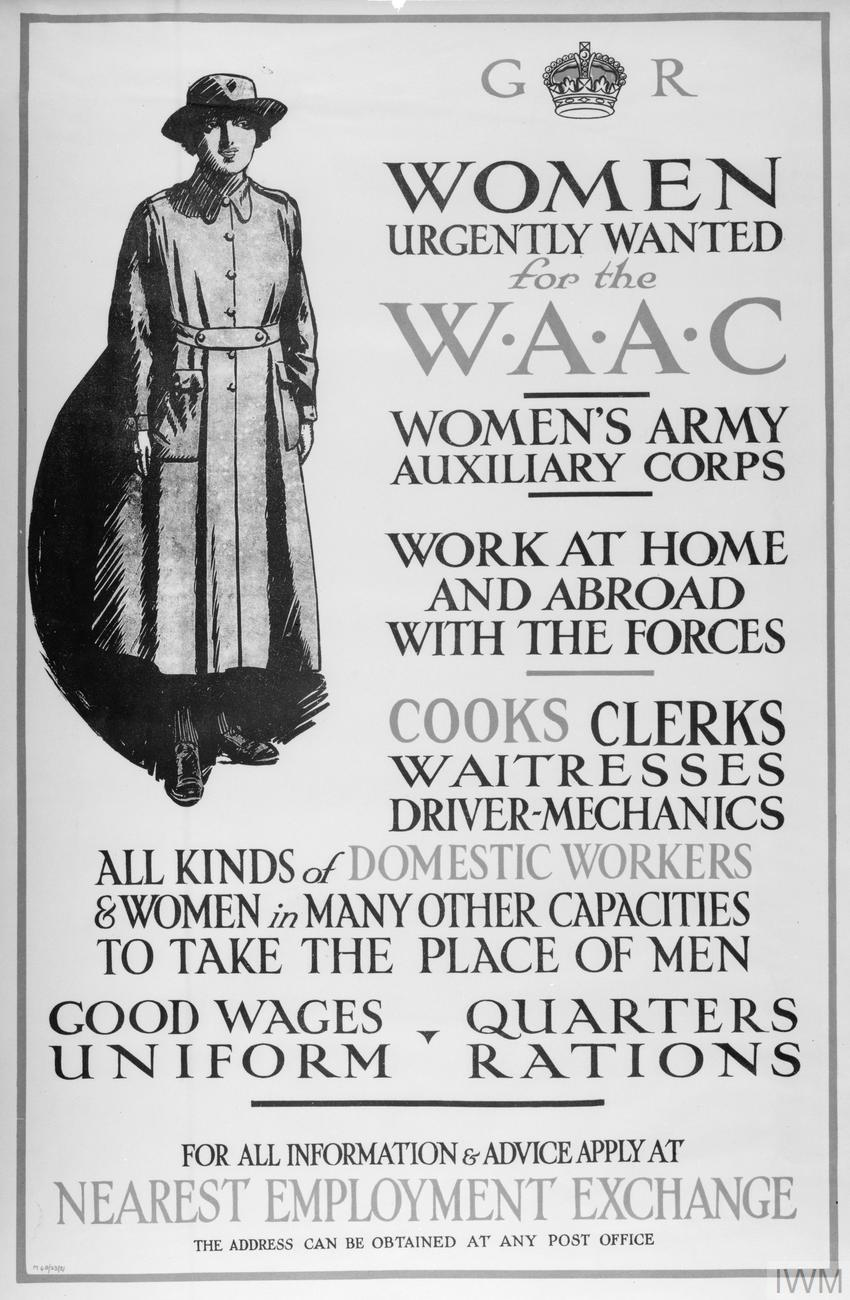
WAAC recruitment poster

Women volunteered to serve in the military in special women-only corps; by the end of the war, over 80,000 had enlisted. Many served as nurses in the following:

- The Queen Alexandra's Imperial Military Nursing Service (QAIMNS)
- The First Aid Nursing Yeomanry (FANY)
- The Voluntary Aid Detachment (VAD)
- The Territorial Force Nursing Service.

Other corps were created to release men from non-combatant roles in the armed forces.

- The Women's Army Auxiliary Corps, later called Queen Mary's Army Auxiliary Corps (WAAC). The WAAC was divided into four sections: cookery; mechanical; clerical and miscellaneous. Most stayed on the Home Front, but around 9,000 served in France.
- The Women's Royal Naval Service (WRNS)
- The Women's Royal Air Force (WRAF)

Two organizations trained women to use weapons in case of an enemy invasion, but the women never actually served in combat: the Women's Emergency Corps, which became the Women's Volunteer Reserve

By the end of World War 1, over 21,000 American women served as nurses in the Army Nurse Corps, even though they were not given official military rank. Many of these nurses treated soldiers who had been hurt by poison gas, gunshot wounds to the chest, and broken bones in hospitals in France and Germany.

World War 1 was a big turning point of nursing. Because the war was so violent and involved so many wounded soldiers, doctors and nurses had to quickly improve how they treated injuries, infections, and mental health problems. Nurses helped lead many of these changes. They also helped create new ways to help soldiers recover, such as activity based therapies and planned recovery programs. The war showed how important nurses were for both the body and the mind of wounded soldiers.

During the 1918 flu pandemic, military nurses became the main caregivers for sick soldiers because there were no strong medicine to cure the illness. The army nurses corps grew from just 403 nurses to more than 21,480, and over 9,000 of them were sent overseas. Nurses helped lower fevers, give fluids, clean wounds, keep hospitals sanitary, and watch patients closely day and night. They worked in crowded hospitals and were often extremely tired. Many nurses became sick, and some died. Out of the 134 nurse deaths in the war, 127 were caused by disease, not by enemy attacks.

=== Poster campaign ===
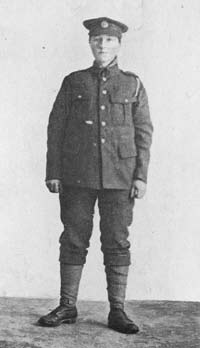
Dorothy Lawrence posing as a soldier

Propaganda, in the form of posters to encouraged women to work in factories, did not show the more dangerous aspects of wartime labour conditions, but appealed to women to join the workforce and play their part in the war. Other posters were designed to encourage women to persuade their men to join the armed forces. One poster has a romantic setting as the women look out of an open window as the soldiers march off to war. The poster possesses a romantic appeal when, in reality, many women endured extreme hardships when their husbands enlisted. Many war posters challenged current social attitudes that women should be passive and emotional, and have moral virtue and domestic responsibility. In one war propaganda poster, titled "These Women Are Doing Their Bit", a woman is represented as making a sacrifice by joining the munitions industry while the men are at the front. The woman in this poster is depicted as cheerful and beautiful, conveying that her patriotic duty will not reduce her femininity. These posters do not communicate the reality of munitions labour, including highly explosive chemicals or illnesses due to harsh work environments. The persuasive images of idealized female figures and idyllic settings were designed to solicit female involvement in the war and greatly influenced the idea of appropriate feminine behavior in wartime Britain. As a result, many women left their domestic lives to join munitions work, enticed by images of better living conditions, patriotic duty and high pay.

=== Munitions factories ===
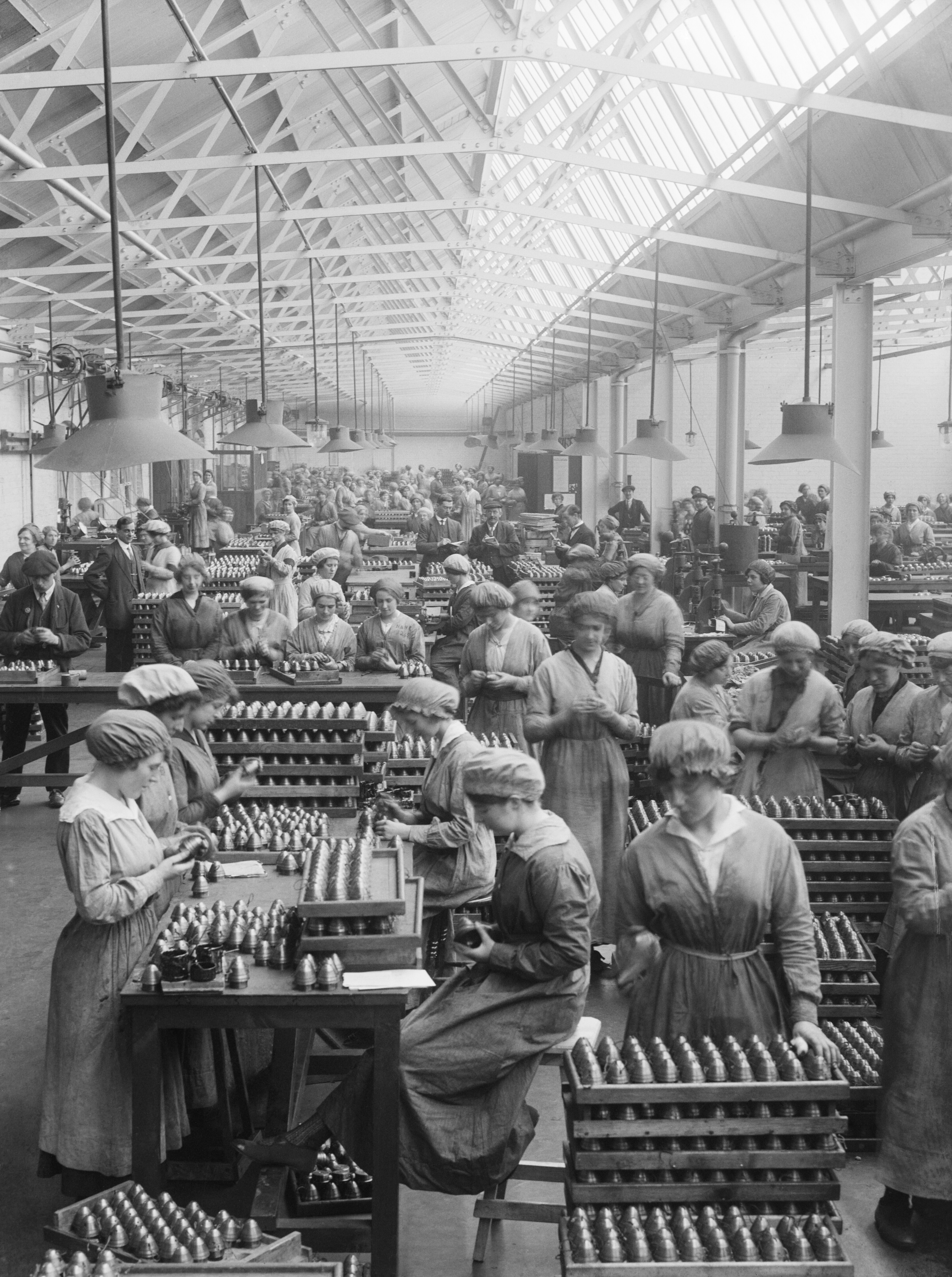
Female workers arranging and packing fuse heads in the Coventry Ordnance Works

Large numbers of women worked in the munitions industry, leaving when the industry reduced at the end of the war. They volunteered for patriotism and the money, with wages often double what they had previously made. Women working in these munitions factories were called "Munitionettes", or were nicknamed "Canaries", because of the yellow skin which came from working with toxic chemicals.

Women working in munitions factories were mainly from working-class families, between the ages of 18 and 29 years. They were involved in the making of shells, explosives, aircraft and other materials that supplied the war at the front, with some women working long hours. This was dangerous and repetitive work, generating toxic fumes and involving handling dangerous machinery and explosives. The factories all over Britain were often unheated and deafeningly noisy. Some of the common diseases and illness which occurred were drowsiness, headaches, eczema, loss of appetite, cyanosis, shortness of breath, vomiting, anaemia, palpitation, bile stained urine, constipation, rapid weak pulse, pains in the limbs and jaundice and mercury poisoning.

HM Factory, Gretna was the United Kingdom's largest cordite factory in World War I. Women from all over the world came to work there, manufacturing what was known as the Devil's Porridge, a term coined by Sir Arthur Conan Doyle to refer to the mixture of gun cotton and nitroglycerine that was used to produce cordite as a shell propellant. They were collectively given the nickname of The Gretna Girls. Many proudly wore the triangular On War Work badge on their uniforms outside work which is now part of the Devils Porridge Museum Logo. There were no creche facilities at Gretna, unlike other munition factories. The highest number of women employed at the factory was 11,576 in 1917, but this figure dropped to 6,285 by October 1918. Most of the site was sold after the war had ended and the women returned home, some having had new experiences such as playing in the factory ladies football team.

While the female role in the social sphere was expanded as they joined previously male-dominated occupations, once the war was over women went back to their role in the home, with their jobs going to returning soldiers. Female labour statistics decreased to pre-war levels and it was not until 1939 that the role of women once again expanded.

=== Other jobs on the home front ===
Many women volunteered on the home front as nurses, teachers, and workers in traditionally male jobs. Wealthy expatriate women from the United States set up an organization called the American Women's War Relief Fund in England in 1914 order to buy ambulances, support hospitals and provide economic opportunities to women during the war.

=== Five Sisters memorial ===
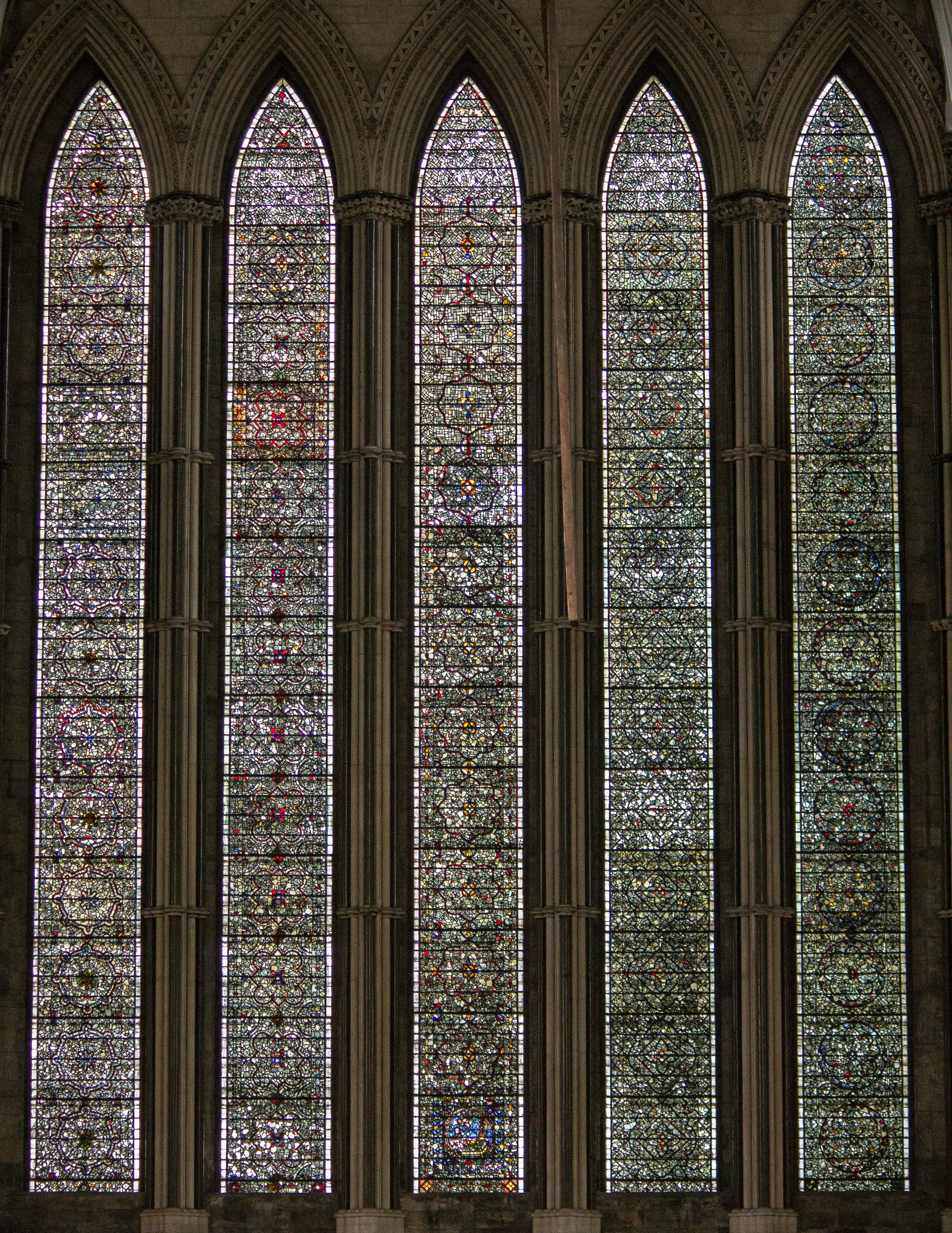
Five Sisters Window, York Minster

York Minster’s Five Sisters window is the only memorial in the UK dedicated to all the women of the British Empire who lost their lives in World War I. Ten oak screens were added to the north side of the St Nicholas Chapel. They list the name of every woman who died in the line of service during WWI. An inscription thereon reads, “This screen records the names of women of the Empire who gave their lives in the war 1914–1918 to whose memory the Five Sisters window was restored by women”. There are 1,513 names listed on the screens.

=== Australia ===
The role of Australian women in World War I was focused mainly on nursing services, with 2,139 Australian nurses serving during World War I. Their contributions were more important than initially expected, resulting in more respect for women in medical professions.

Some women made ANZAC biscuits which were shipped to the soldiers. The biscuits were made using a recipe that would allow them to remain edible for a long time without refrigeration.

=== Canada ===
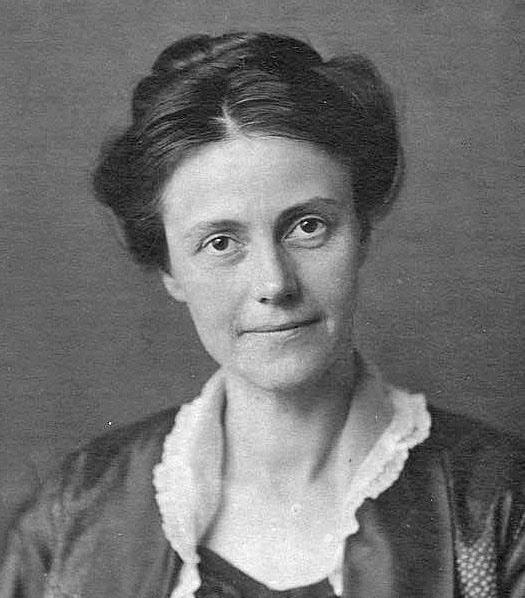
Julia Grace Wales in 1916

During World War I, there was virtually no female presence in the Canadian armed forces, with the exception of the 3,141 nurses serving both overseas and on the home front. Of these women, 328 had been decorated by King George V, and 46 gave their lives in the line of duty. Even though a number of these women received decorations for their efforts, many high-ranking military personnel still felt that they were unfit for the job. Although the Great War had not officially been opened up to women, they did feel the pressures at home. There had been a gap in employment when the men enlisted; many women strove to fill this void along with keeping up with their responsibilities at home.

The Volunteer Aid Detachment (VAD) nurse organization was primarily a British organization, however over two-thousand members came from Canada. The majority of VAD nurses worked in military convalescent hospitals during the war, although around five hundred nurses were posted overseas as "active service" VAD's. Historian Janet Watson argues that VADs were the feminine equivalent of fighting men, and that women were exhorted to "rally to the call" and "make heroic sacrifices of time and money". Similarly to nurses at the time, VAD nurses wore a military style outfit that included a skirt and a red cross on the shirt portion of the uniform.

Health care practitioners had to deal with medical anomalies they had never seen before. The chlorine gas that was used by the Germans caused injuries that treatment protocols had not yet been developed for. The only treatment that soothed the affected soldiers was the care they received from the nurses. Canadian nurses were especially well known for their kindness.

Canadians had expected that women would feel sympathetic to the war efforts, but the idea that they would contribute in such a physical way was absurd to most. Because of the support that women had shown from the beginning of the war, people began to see their value in the war. In May 1918, a meeting was held to discuss the possible creation of the Canadian Women's Corps. In September, the motion was approved, but the project was pushed aside because the war's end was in sight.

Due to the amount of men who went to War, many jobs became available to women. During this period, many jobs that women could occupy were related to the War effort. Head of Imperial Munition's Bond Mark Irish was sent a list of occupations available to World War I. This was to indicate what Canadian women could do in the munitions industry. Examples of jobs available to women included: core making Howitzer bombs, filling shells and gas bombs, testing and inspecting bombs, fitting in breeches of 3" submarine guns, and molding shrapnel bullets.

On the Canadian home front, there were many ways which women could participate in the war effort. Lois Allan joined the Farm Services Corps in 1918, to replace the men who were sent to the front. Allan was placed at E.B. Smith and Sons where she hulled strawberries for jam. Jobs were opened up at factories as well, as industrial production increased. Work days for these women consisted of ten to twelve hours, six days a week. Because the days consisted of long monotonous work, many women made up parodies of popular songs to get through the day and boost morale. Depending on the area of Canada, some women were given a choice to sleep in either barracks or tents at the factory or farm that they were employed at. According to a brochure that was issued by the Canadian Department of Public Works, there were several areas in which it was appropriate for women to work. These were:

1. On fruit or vegetable farms.
2. In the camps to cook for workers.
3. On mixed and dairy farms.
4. In the farmhouse to help feed those who are raising the crops.
5. In canneries, to preserve the fruit and vegetables.
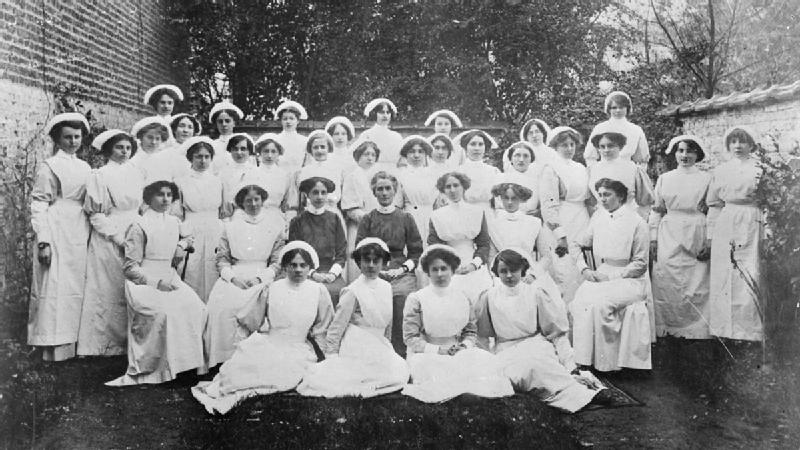
6. Nurse Edith Cavell in Brussels. 1915
  To take charge of milk routes.

In addition, many women were involved in charitable organization such as the Ottawa Women's Canadian Club, which helped provide the needs of soldiers, families of soldiers and the victims of war. Women were deemed 'soldiers on the home front', encouraged to use less of nearly everything, and to be frugal in order to save supplies for the war efforts.

In Western Canada, prairie farm women worked alongside men before the war. Women's workloads increased on the farm when the men went to go and fight during the First World War. The efforts of women were heavily ignored before the war began, and gouvernment officials considered their work as specifically patriotic in an effort to maintain pre-war gender ideals.. Cultural authorities encouraged women to continue to work on farms to relieve a economic and labour "crisis". During the First World War, women filled certain farming roles that were usually only held by men to assist the shortage issue during the conflict.

=== Notable individuals ===
- After Australian doctor Agnes Bennett tried to enlist in the Australian Imperial Force and was rebuffed, she volunteered for the Scottish Women's Hospitals for Foreign Service. She later became the first woman surgeon to be commissioned into the British Army.
- British nurse Edith Cavell helped treat injured soldiers of both sides in German-occupied Belgium. She was executed in 1915 by the Germans for helping Allied soldiers escape to neutral Netherlands. Her death caused an international outrage and caused enlistment in the British army to soar.
- Canadian nurse Laura Gamble served in various European countries and received the Royal Red Cross 2nd class in 1917 at Buckingham Palace.
- British artist Lady Helena Gleichen served as an ambulance driver and radiographer in France and Italy, where she was given the rank of major in the army. She later received the Italian Bronze Medal of Military Valour and was invested as a Dame of Grace of the Order of St John of Jerusalem and as an officer, Order of the British Empire in 1920.
- Evelina Haverfield founded the Women's Reserve Ambulance Corps and served in Serbia in 1915–16.
- Elsie Inglis was a Scottish surgeon and suffragist. She founded the Scottish Women's Hospitals for Foreign Service, supported by the women's suffrage movement. In all, fourteen female-staffed relief hospitals were set up to serve the wounded in seven countries. In recognition of her work in Serbia, she became the first woman to receive that country's highest honour, the Order of the White Eagle.
- Australian Olive Kelso King drove ambulances for the Scottish Women's Hospitals and later the Serbian Army. In the final stages of the war she raised money and set up mobile canteens to help feed the Serbian people. In all, she was awarded four medals by the Serbian government for her work during the war.
- Flora Sandes volunteered to join a St. John Ambulance unit in Serbia and subsequently became an officer in the Serbian army. In 1916, she received the highest decoration of the Serbian Military, the Order of Karađorđe's Star. In 1919, she became the Serbian Army's first female commissioned officer.
- In December 1914, Canadian academic Julia Grace Wales published the Wisconsin Plan, also known as the Canada Plan, a proposal to set up a mediating conference consisting of intellectuals from neutral nations who would work to find a suitable solution for the First World War. The plan was presented to the United States Congress, but despite arousing the interest of President Wilson, failed when the US entered the war.
- In October 1918, Irishwoman Josephine Carr became the first female naval member to be killed in action when the RMS Leinster was torpedoed in the Irish sea.
- Canadian Margaret C. Macdonald was a nurse and the matron-in-chief of Canada's overseas nursing service during the First World War.

== Finland ==
In the 1918 Finnish Civil War, more than 2,000 women fought in the Women's Red Guards formed in early February with more than 15 female guard units. Female guards saw combat throughout the war, in battles such as the Battle of Tampere where the city hall was held by the last pockets of Red Guard resistance. At the end of the civil war over 755 Red Guard women had died, 70 to 130 of them killed on the battlefield, over 20% or 400 to 500 members would be executed by the anti-communist White Guard victors and 80 to 110 died in prison camps with 150 to 200 members AWOL.

Finnish women's military units were planned during the First World War and were formed in the Finnish Civil War by the Red Guard.

== France ==
While the men are at the front, women drive the tram, Bordeaux, 1916

In France, the situation differed significantly depending on whether one lived in the German-occupied zone or in the "free zone". The occupied zone encompassed 3.7% of French territory and 8.2% of its population—amounting to two million inhabitants—with German-held Alsace-Lorraine excluded from this figure. The Germans carried out expulsions, forcing 500,000 people to relocate to the "free zone" via Switzerland. What began as forced departures soon shifted toward voluntary ones. The remaining population capable of working, primarily women and young girls, was subjected to forced labor, which sometimes entailed deportation. People suffered from hunger, looting, requisitions, and various forms of abuse.

Women welding fins onto artillery shells, La Chaléassière forges and workshops (Saint-Étienne), 1916

Throughout the rest of the country, with men away at the front, women had to step in to take their places, initially in the fields, starting in the summer of 1914, and subsequently in factories, particularly those producing armaments. Women were already employed in the metallurgical sector in 1914, accounting for 7–10% of the workforce in the Paris region. By 1918, women made up nearly a third of the workforce in the Paris region.

Notable individuals

- Madame Arnaud, widow of a French army officer, organized the Volunteer Corps of French and Belgian Women for National Defense.
- Louise de Bettignies was a French secret agent who spied on the Germans for the British using the pseudonym Alice Dubois. The Alice Network she organized included some 80 people. De Bettignies was posthumously awarded the Cross of the Legion of Honour, the Croix de guerre 1914–1918 (France) with palm, and the British Military Medal, and she was made an Officer of the Order of the British Empire.
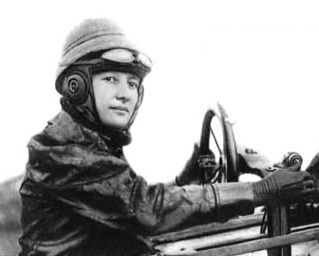
- 1912 photograph of Marie Marvingt in an airplane
  In 1915 Marie Marvingt became the first woman to fly combat missions. She received the Croix de guerre (Military Cross) for her aerial bombing of a German military base in Metz.
- Émilienne Moreau, who was only 16 years old when the Germans invaded France, set up a school and later converted her family home to a makeshift first aid station. She killed several Germans, including two with a revolver, for which she received the French Military Cross, along with other awards and medals from the British.
- Louise Thuliez was a teacher who worked with British nurse Edith Cavell and others to help Allied soldiers who were trapped behind enemy lines to get out of Belgium and into Holland. She was captured along with Cavell in 1915 and sentenced to death, but her sentence was commuted to life in prison after the uproar over Cavell's execution. She was awarded the Croix de Guerre and the Legion of Honour.
- Marie Léonie Vanhoutte worked with Louise de Bettignies using the code name Charlotte Lameron. She was awarded the Legion of Honour, the Croix de guerre 1914–1918 (France), and she was made an Officer of the Order of the British Empire.

== German Empire ==
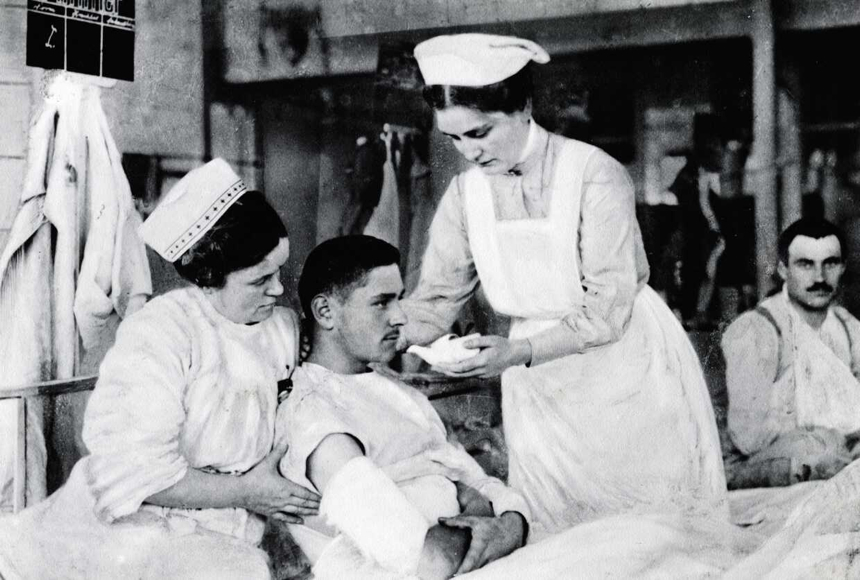
German Red Cross nurses attending to wounded soldiers

Germany was hit very hard by food shortages due to early agreements among the Allies and neutral countries to cut Germany off from vital supplies. Facing wheat shortages, the country eventually began producing K-brot, a maligned type of bread made with potato. The working class that was forced to eat this bread felt it inferior to wheat bread and resented those who ate wheat breads and cakes during the war. The public perception of soldiers' wives in wartime Germany was that they had improved their station while German workers suffered. She was singled out for the ire and suspicion of the working class who questioned whether she fit the idealized image of the frugal wartime homemaker who formed the backbone of the "voluntary homefront army".

The resentment against soldiers' wives spread among the police as well who felt her conduct was inconsistent with the German ideal and that her privileged status had outstripped their own: "soldiers' wives ought not to make so much racket so they don't have to stuff their muzzles so much."

The police resented that women would benefit in such manner from their husband's service and protestors rejected the notion that soldiers' wives should be spending their afternoons "consuming quantities of cake and whipped cream with their children" while the nation could scarce afford such luxuries. There were complaints of women "dressed in somber clothing, claiming to be robbed of their breadwinner or other close family member...creating a sobering image;but one must on the other hand note that the women are untouched by either neediness or despair." One German officer said "it is exactly the poorer women who daily occupy the cafes of department stores, sampling delicacies that certainly don't number among the most necessary foods."

=== Notable individuals ===
- Ada Schnee was a naturalized German author, born to British parents in 1872 New Zealand. Her memoir about life in German East Africa as the wife of the last German governor, Heinrich Schnee, was published in 1918. In this book, titled Bibi Mkuba: My Experiences in German East Africa during World War I, she wrote about her experience as an eye witness of the East African campaign of World War I and her captivity as a female alien enemy.
- Annemarie Reimer was a doctor's wife from Tapiau in East Prussia who served under contract as a staff-car driver with the German army on the Eastern Front from 1914 to 1915, and was described at the time as the only woman driver attached to the German army's motor service. Her memoir, Sieben Monate an der Ostfront als Kraftwagenführerin (Seven Months on the Eastern Front as a Motor Driver, 1915), which included her meeting with Kaiser Wilhelm II, was reviewed at length in The New York Times in 1916.

== Ottoman Empire ==
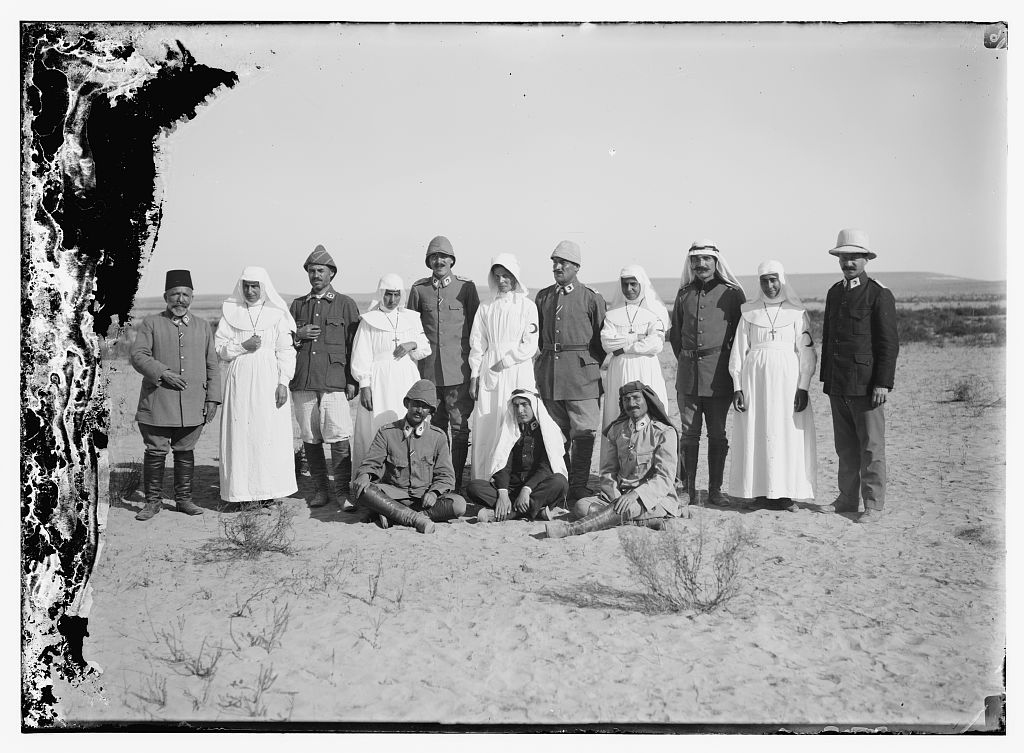
Ottoman Red Crescent and Red Cross staff at Hafir el Aujah.

Women had limited front line roles, being nurses and providing a subsidiary work force of emergency medical personnel. This was in response to the lack of manpower available since the empire was battling on multiple fronts, forcing the conscription of most of its male population. This medical workforce of women was made possible through organizations created by the government and international organizations, such as the Red Cross.

Women such as Safiye Huseyin risked their lives working on the Reşit Paşa Hospital Ship for wounded soldiers. This ship took in wounded Ottoman soldiers from the Dardanelles and was oftentimes bombarded by enemy planes and other ships.

Women were also given limited roles in employment positions by the Islamic Organization for the Employment of Women (IOEW), an organization formed in 1916 with the aim to "protect women by finding them work and by making them accustomed to making a living in an honorable way". This was a necessary step to find workers to continue production of military goods while most of the available male population was off fighting the war. The IOEW would prove to be responsible for a majority of the increase in female labor force in the military industrial industry in the 1916–1917. For example, over 900 women were employed by the organization at the military footwear factory in Beykoz. The organization would come to an end after the termination of orders from the military and the NDL at the end of the war, leading to a decrease in female labor force demand in the year following the war, and an eventual closure of all of its factories and disbandment of the IOEW.

Along with an increased demand in labor forces came an increase in white collared and civil service roles for women, though to a much lesser degree than men. The mass mobilization of the male workforce prompted the nation to speed up the process of allowing urban, educated Muslim women into white collared jobs. The discrimination of non-Muslims with policies such as the 1915 deportation opened up a lot more jobs for Ottoman muslim women for entrepreneurial roles within the country's economy. When the country outlawed the use of any language except for Turkish in March 1916, it in turn granted new opportunities for Ottoman women that knew Turkish and other foreign languages with a specific focus given to women through organizations such as the Ottoman School of Commerce, which opened a branch specifically for women. The IOEW also provided women with administrative jobs and served as an intermediary for the school to allocate women students as interns in commercial and financial institutions throughout the country.

Women shouldered a large portion of the agricultural and manufacturing burdens during the war, having to deal with the harsh conditions of wartime life with many women having to work in the construction of roads and fortifications. Rising prices of both staple items and consumer goods also rendered many women unable to subsist during these harsh conditions. To make matters worse, there were deserters and refugees roaming vast areas in the Ottoman Empire plundering and stealing large stocks of goods such as maize and hazelnuts that were stockpiled to last the war. Worst of all perhaps was that state officials through the military were pressuring many village women to provide grain for the army at little to no compensation; grain that was once meant for their own subsistence would instead be taken away to feed the army. Many homes were also commandeered by the military for various purposes forcing people (mostly women, due to the vast majority of men being absent to fight in the war) to sleep outside. These wartime conditions affected women disproportionately to men due to the forced conscription nature of the Ottoman Empire leaving women to take care of villages and homes throughout the country.

Another shocking look at the lives of Ottoman women during the war was the frequency of petitioners to underline the martyrdom (şehitlik) of their sons and husbands to show the contribution of their men to the war effort. If the death of a woman's family member was deemed worthy enough by the government, the woman would be allowed a small pension payment based on the contribution of their dead loved ones. This was also meant to show their religious faith in a public setting.

Ottoman women were not given much of a voice in the inner workings of the government. Women would suffer violence and misogynistic negative reactions towards the end of the war as men returned to reclaim their jobs. However, the war also gave way to new ideas and desires for women's rights and is illustrated in the folk songs and state bureaucracy that followed the war.

== Russia ==
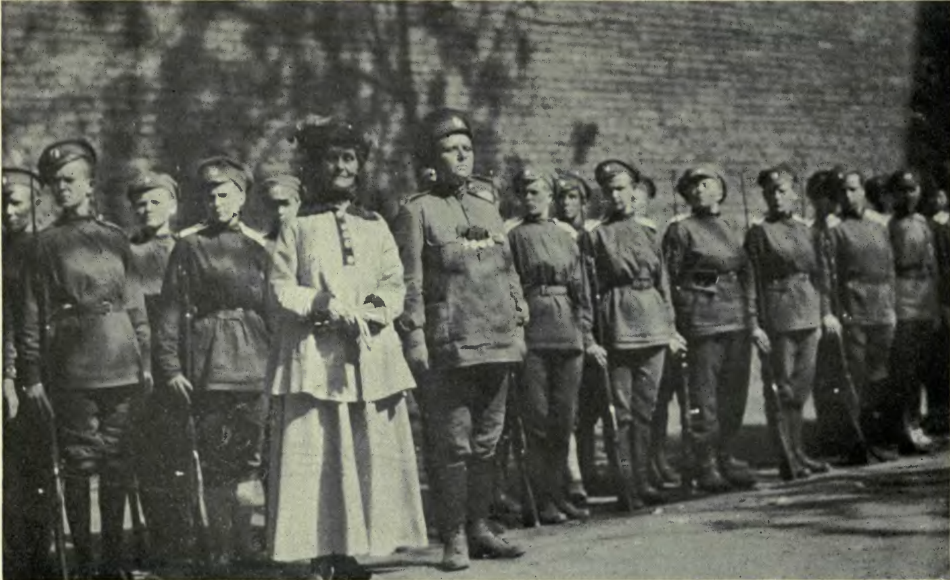
Maria Bochkareva and the Women's Battalion of Death

The only belligerent to deploy female combat troops in substantial numbers was the Russian Provisional Government in 1917. Its few "Women's Battalions" fought well, but failed to provide the propaganda value expected of them and were disbanded before the end of the year. In the later Russian Civil War, the Bolsheviks would also employ women infantry.

=== Notable individuals ===
- Maria Bochkareva, nicknamed Yashka, received the personal permission of Tsar Nicholas II to fight with men in 1914 and formed the 1st Russian Women's Battalion of Death in 1917.
- Olga Krasilnikova disguised herself as a man and fought in Poland in 1915. She received the Cross of St. George.
- Natalie Tychmini fought the Austrians at Opatow in 1915, while disguised as a man. She received the Cross of St. George.
- Marina Yurlova served in uniform as a fighting Cossack, volunteering in 1914 at the age of 14. Wounded in combat on several occasions, she repeatedly won the Cross of St. George for bravery.

== Serbia ==
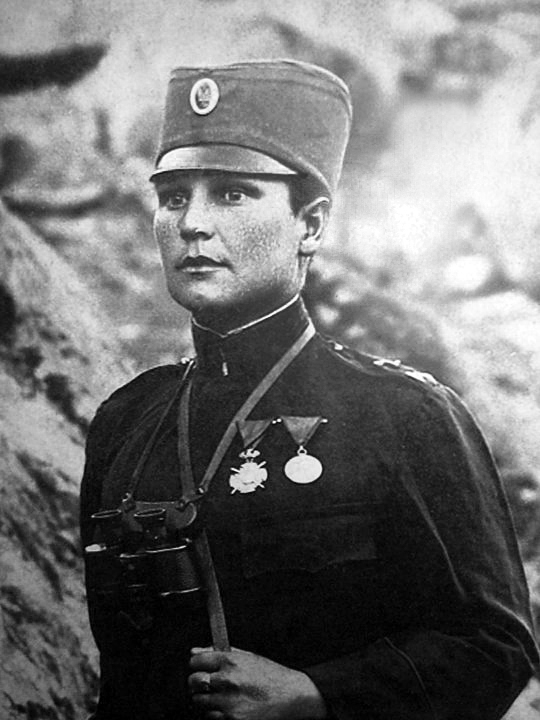
Photograph of Milunka Savić in military uniform

There were several women that fought in the war, such as Milunka Savić, who received the French War Cross with the Golden Palm, being the only woman to receive it; Sofija Jovanović who fought partly due the vow to her late father; veteran nurse-turned-soldier Antonija Javornik; guerrilla teenager Slavka Tomić, and others. There were also foreign volunteers that fought as soldiers, such as the British Flora Sandes and Leslie Joy Whitehead.

Also includes a limited role for women volunteers as nurses during the war as well as in manufacturing roles outside the front lines. During the Great War, Serbia could be considered a country of women with a far greater number of women compared to men, Serbian census in 1910 showed there were 100 females per 107 males but by the time of the Austro-Hungarian census in 1916 there were 100 females per sixty-nine males, many of the men gone from the census just a short six years later were killed in combat, involved in the war effort or interned in camps. This led to a shortage of men in Serbia with many young and middle-aged women, not able to find similarly aged partners. During this time period in Serbia as a female-dominated society the prevailing feeling of the majority of the nation was sadness, fear and anxiety because of the war, with very few marriages occurring during the war because of the disproportional numbers of men and women with more illegitimate children being born during this time, with 4 percent of children being illegitimate as compared to peace times 1 percent. As such children were the main victim of the war in Serbia, as women were forced to take upon the "social responsibilities of men including toiling in the fields, doing hard physical labour, breeding livestock and protecting their properties. It also shifted the traditional role of women in Serbia from that of the housewife to being the primary breadwinner in the family while the majority of men were fighting, leading to new obligations such as taxes, surtaxes and war loans that women in Serbia would have to contend along with the role of caretaker of the household. In fact, the war sent a message about the changing role of women.

Under wartime conditions, Serbian women began engaging in a number of activities outside their previous domain. Unexpectedly, but in most cases of their own will, women began appearing on the battlefront in the middle of the ravages of war. Some of them took up arms (Milunka Savić, Sofija Jovanović, Antonija Javornik, Slavka Tomić and others) defending their fatherland no differently than men, showing surprising courage and valour. A larger number of women started volunteering in military and civilian hospitals. They were housewives, artists (Nadežda Petrović), writers (Danica Marković), doctors (like Draga Ljočić), semi-skilled nurses, caretakers, teachers; some of them were highly educated and others were not as fortunate but they were astute, skillful and quick-learners. What they had in common was an intense loyalty to their country and love for their people that suffered utter devastation during the Great War. Most Serbian nurses had completed crash courses on looking after the ill and wounded at in-patient clinics or makeshift military field hospitals and ad hoc dressing stations. Draginja Babić, Ljubica Luković, Kasija Miletić and Mirka Grujić worked as members of the Circle of Serbian Sisters, whereas others were organized as part of the Red Cross mission in Serbia and abroad to solicit aid (Helen Losanitch Frothingham). Women from foreign countries, the members of international medical missions, were also of great support to Serbian volunteers in their effort to help others. During the early stages of the conflict foreign missions arrived in Serbia from Great Britain and Scotland, the United States of America, France, Imperial Russia, Switzerland, Australia, Denmark and the Netherlands. The members of the missions were mostly women – trained doctors and nurses – and they ran entire hospitals in the Kingdom of Serbia and the Kingdom of Montenegro. Elsie Inglis, Evelina Haverfield, Elizabeth Ross, Leila Paget, Mabel Grouitch, Margaret Neill Fraser, Louisa Jordan, Edith Holloway, Josephine Bedford, Isabel Emslie Hutton, Katherine Harley, Laura Margaret Hope, Jessie Scott, Eleanor Soltau, Lillias Hamilton, Florence MacDowell, Frances "Fairy' Warren, Mabel St Clair Stobart who founded the Women's Sick and Wounded Convoy Corps and Olive Kelso King who drove an ambulance truck – these were some of the female humanitarian workers who shared the fate of Serbian people and army in the Great War. Together with their "Samaritan sisters" from Serbia, they used their medical knowledge and experience to help the Serbian army and in this way, they became part of the modern history of a small country from the Balkans and of the people who suffered the tragic Great Retreat over the treacherous Albanian mountains in the middle of 1915–1916 winter.

The rising tide of nationalism at the wake of the 20th century was certainly one of the women's motives in choosing humanitarian and charitable work. Aligning all these circumstances made it possible for a woman to break free from a historically long subordinate position in Serbian patriarchal society.

=== Notable individuals ===
- Milunka Savić, fought in the Iron Regiment, one of the most highly decorated women in military history.
- Sofija Jovanović, fought in the Srem Volunteer Detachment.
- Živana Terzić, guerrilla, fought in the 2nd Platoon of the Iron Regiment.
- Mara Petrović, former Chetnik.

== United States ==
=== In the military ===
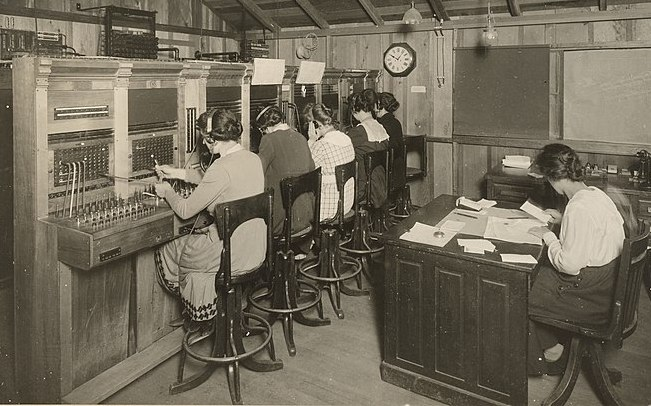
Members of the Army Signal Corp operating telephone switchboards

During the course of the war, 21,498 U.S. Army nurses (American military nurses were all women then) served in military hospitals in the United States and overseas. Many of these women were positioned near to battlefields, and they tended to over a million soldiers who had been wounded or were unwell. 272 U.S. Army nurses died of disease (mainly tuberculosis, influenza, and pneumonia). Eighteen African-American Army nurses served stateside caring for German prisoners of war (POWs) and African-American soldiers. They were assigned to Camp Grant, IL, and Camp Sherman, OH, and lived in segregated quarters.

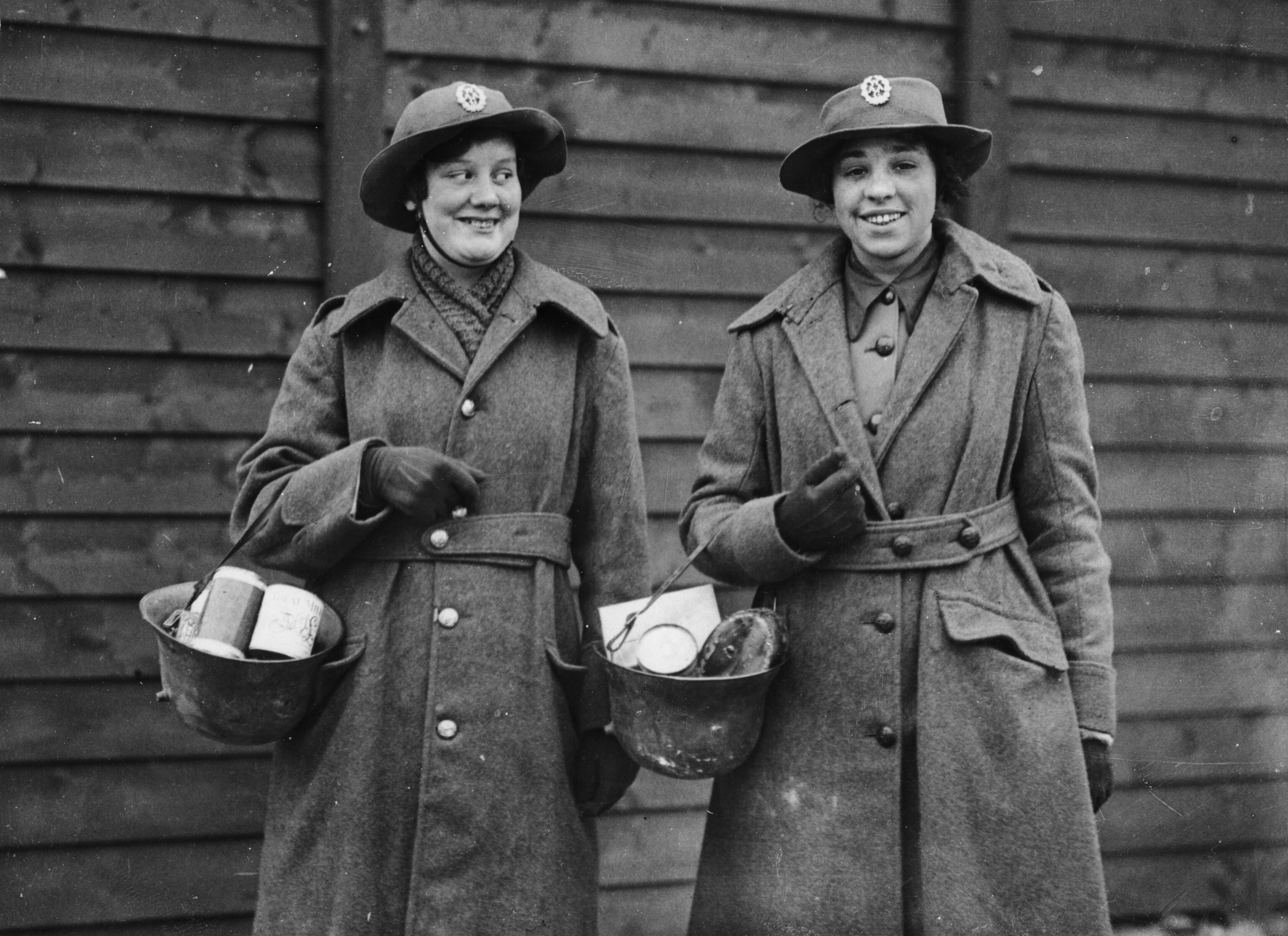
Two members of the Women's Army Auxiliary Corps in France using German helmets as baskets

Hello Girls was the colloquial name for American female switchboard operators in World War I, formally known as the Signal Corps Female Telephone Operators Unit. During World War I, these switchboard operators were sworn into the Army Signal Corps. This corps was formed in 1917 from a call by General John J. Pershing to improve the worsening state of communications on the Western front. Applicants for the Signal Corps Female Telephone Operators Unit had to be bilingual in English and French to ensure that orders would be heard by anyone. Over 7,000 women applied, but only 450 women were accepted. Many of these women were former switchboard operators or employees at telecommunications companies. Despite the fact that they wore Army Uniforms and were subject to Army Regulations, they were not given honorable discharges but were considered "civilians" employed by the military, because Army Regulations specified the male gender. Not until 1978, the 60th anniversary of the end of World War I, did Congress approve veteran status and honorable discharges for the remaining women who had served in the Signal Corps Female Telephone Operators Unit.

The first American women enlisted into the regular armed forces were 13,000 women admitted into active duty in the U.S. Navy during the war. They served stateside in jobs and received the same benefits and responsibilities as men, including identical pay (US$28.75 per month), and were treated as veterans after the war.

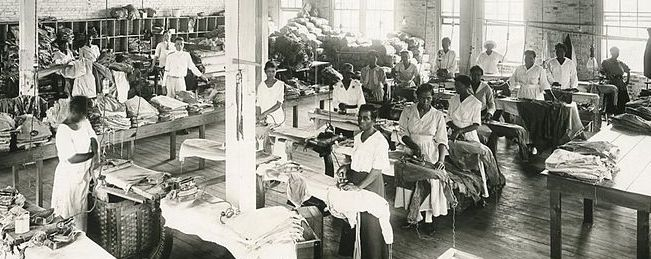
African American women cleaning and repairing military uniforms

The U.S. Marine Corps enlisted 305 female Marine Reservists (F) to "free men to fight" by filling positions such as clerks and telephone operators on the home front.

In January 1918, Myrtle Hazard enlisted and became a radio operator and then an electrician in the Coast Guard. She was the only woman to serve for the Coast Guard during the war. It is widely believed that twin sisters Genevieve and Lucille Baker transferred from the Naval Coastal Defense Reserve to the U.S. Coast Guard in 1918 but their story has been discovered to be apocryphal.

These women were demobilized when hostilities ceased, and aside from the Nurse Corps the uniformed military became once again exclusively male. In 1942, women were brought into the military again, largely following the British model.

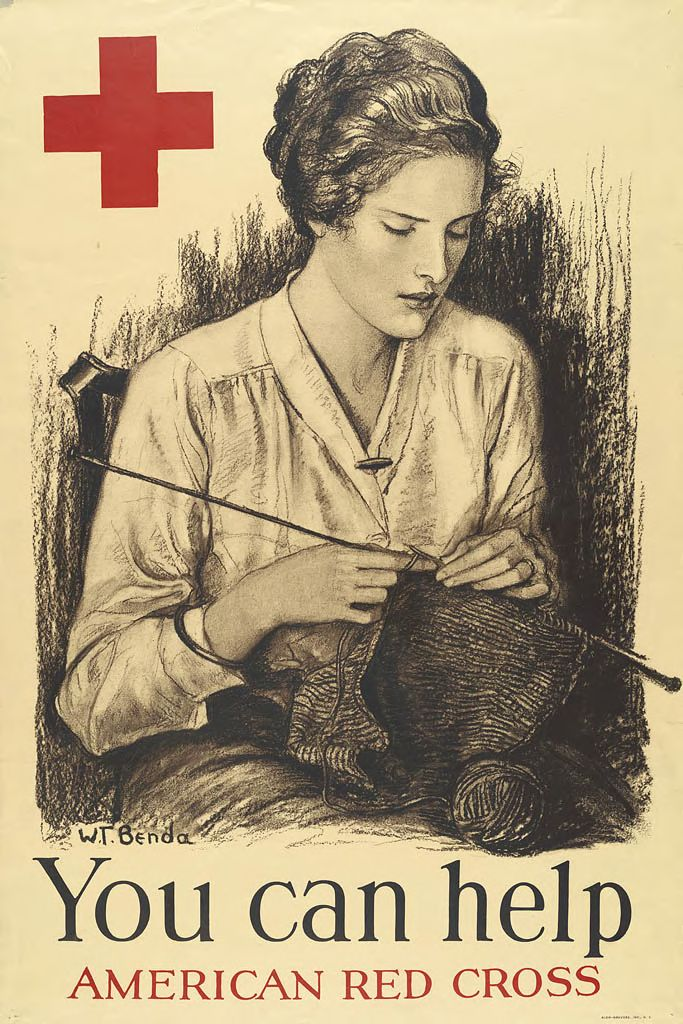
American Red Cross recruiting poster

=== Non-military support ===
- The Woman's Land Army of America was a civilian organization that employed tens of thousands of women in agricultural jobs in order to free men for military service.
- The Red Cross employed some eight million women as volunteers in various capacities and trained nearly 20,000 nurses for the armed forces. They also organized the Motor Service, consisting of thousands of drivers and auto mechanics who provided transportation of various kinds.
- Salvation Army "Lassies" provided coffee, baked goods and various personal services, such as letter writing, to soldiers in the US and abroad.

=== Notable individuals ===
- Grace Banker, Chief Operator of the Hello Girls, received the Army Distinguished Service Medal.
- Mabel Grouitch, an American nurse who worked with the Red Cross. In 1914 she led a group of nurses, including Flora Sandes, from the United Kingdom to Serbia.
- Joy Bright Hancock was among the first women to enlist in the US Navy. She received the World War I Victory Medal and was later instrumental in the integration of women into the regular Navy.
- Lenah H. Sutcliffe Higbee (1874–1941) served as Superintendent of the U.S. Navy Nurse Corps. She is best known for being the first female recipient of the Navy Cross. The USS Higbee, a destroyer in the United States Navy during World War II, was the first U.S. warship named for a female member of the U.S. Navy, The USS Lenah H. Sutcliffe Higbee, a guided missile destroyer also named after Higbee, was christened on 24 April 2021 in Pascagoula, Mississippi.
- Anna Howard Shaw founded the Women's Committee of the United States Council of National Defense, for which she became the first woman to earn the Distinguished Service Medal.
- Julia Hunt Catlin Park DePew Taufflieb, philanthropist and the first American woman to be awarded the Croix de Guerre and Legion d'honneur after turning her French chateau into a hospital.

== Other notable individuals ==
=== Belgian ===
- Marthe Cnockaert worked as a nurse in Westrozebeke and Rousselaere, treating both German and Allied soldiers. She was enlisted by a family friend to spy for British Intelligence and for a time served as a double agent. She was awarded the Iron Cross by the Germans for her medical service. In 1916 she was arrested and spent two years in prison. After the war, she received numerous honors from the governments of France, Belgium and Great Britain, and wrote a memoir entitled I Was a Spy!
- Gabrielle Petit spied for the British Secret Service in Belgium. She was executed in 1916 and became a Belgian national heroine after the war's end. In 1919 her body was reburied in a state funeral.

=== Romanian ===
- Known for her bravery, Ecaterina Teodoroiu received two Military Virtue Medals and was named a second lieutenant, becoming the first female officer in the Romanian army. After she was killed in battle in 1917, she became a national hero and was given a state funeral in 1921.

== See also ==
- Congress of Allied Women on War Service
- Home front during World War I
- Women's roles in the World Wars
- Women in the World Wars
- Queen Alexandra's Royal Army Nursing Corps (UK)
- Voluntary Aid Detachment (UK)
- Women's Land Army (UK)
- Yeoman (F) (US)
- United States Navy Nurse Corps (US)
- United States Army Nurse Corps (US)
- American women in World War I (US)
- United States home front during World War I (US)
- Woman's Land Army of America (US)

== Sources ==
- Atwood, Kathryn (2014). Women Heroes of World War I: 16 Remarkable Resisters, Soldiers, Spies, and Medics. Chicago Review Press. pp. 148–. ISBN 978-1613746899.
- Lee, Janet I Wish My Mother Could See Me Now: The First Aid Nursing Yeomanry (Fany)
- Lee, Janet "Negotiation of Gender and Class Relations, 1907–1918," NWSA Journal, (2007) pp. 138–158.
