= Ljubica Luković =

Serbian nurse and social worker

- Born: Ljubica Avramović (Serbian: Љубица Аврамовић); 1858; Pančevo, Austrian Empire
- Died: 11 February 1915 (aged 56–57); Valjevo Hospital, Valjevo, Kingdom of Serbia
- Occupations: teacher, translator, social work, women's rights activist, nurse
- Years active: 1875–1915
- Known for: establishing the first nurses' training course in Serbia

Ljubica Luković (Serbian: Љубица Луковић) (1858–1915) was a Serbian nurse, social worker, teacher, translator and president of the Circle of Serbian Sisters. She was instrumental in establishing the first nurses' training course in Serbia and was posthumously awarded the Florence Nightingale Medal.

== Early life ==
Ljubica Avramović was born in 1858 in Pančevo, Austrian Empire to the renowned professor and philologist, Jeftimije Avramović. Her father was an honored member of the Serbian Learned Society, which later became the Serbian Royal Academy and later still, the Serbian Academy of Sciences and Arts. Professor Avramović was one of the first to translate works from ancient Greek into the Serbian language and he spoke French, German, Italian and Russian. He also passed on his love of language and learning to his children, including his son Sima, who would become a politician and writer; and his daughters, Ljubica, Milica, and Olga. Avramović enrolled in the Belgrade Higher Girls' School, which was the most elite women's secondary school in Serbia and graduated with a teaching degree.

== Career ==
Wanting to follow in her father's footsteps, Avramović began her career teaching and translating. She translated French literature into Serbian and published articles in various magazines like The Hostess and Bosnian Villas two magazines with literary and cultural focus which aimed to lift women and encourage them to pursue education. Many of her articles were written under the pseudonym, "Etinecelle". In 1875, Avramović joined with a group of educated women to found the Belgrade Women's Society under the patronage of Princess Natalie. The organization was the first women's rights organization in the country and aimed to bring traditional women's roles in educating youth, helping the sick, creating handicrafts, into the public sphere to help women become more independent. Avramović served on the managing board of the organization and worked to foster charitable projects to help women from across the socio-economic spectrum. When the Serbo-Turkish War broke out in 1876, the organization established hospitals in cooperation with the Red Cross to assist the military medical corps and Avramović volunteered as a nurse. When the war ended, she helped establish a women's vocational school.

In 1877, Avramović married a young military officer, Stevan Luković (who became a Serbian army general), and traveled with him throughout various posts in Serbia. He was the commander of the Ministry of Military Engineers and Engineering and wherever the couple lived, Luković helped establish women's organizations that performed social services. One such organization, the Princess Ljubica Society, was founded in Belgrade in 1899 and for which Luković served as vice president and comptroller, collected funds and clothing to help churches and monasteries in Serbia and Macedonia. In 1903, Serbia was in turmoil. The May coup d'état and assassination of King Aleksandar Obrenović, the Ilinden–Preobrazhenie Uprising of Macedonia and the ascension of King Peter Karađorđević had created a pressing need for assistance organizations to help those fleeing the violence. Luković joined the newly established Circle of Serbian Sisters, a humanitarian organization aimed to provide help "regardless of ethnic or religious background" to Serbs. By 1905, the first president, Savka Subotić had resigned and Luković was elected as the new president.

In 1906, the Circle began publishing a newsletter called Vardar which used the lyrics of songs and cultural stories from all four faiths, Orthodox, Catholic, Jewish, and Muslim to create a national calendar and cultural identity for its readership. The newsletter also reported on the civic works of the organization. The newsletter was popular, and its circulation rapidly increased from about 5,000 readers to 40,000. That same year, Luković pushed an initiative as president of the Circle to host the first nursing course at the Belgrade Military Hospital. The goal of the three-month training program, which Luković personally completed, was to train 30 nurses each year as a nursing reserve. Luković and her friend Delfa Ivanić also approached the Chief of Sanitation of the Military Ministry with plans to found a hospital in the Vračar neighborhood. While he agreed to the need of a hospital, there were no funds for its construction. Ivanić and Luković undertook a letter writing campaign across Europe entreating embassies, consuls, newspapers and Serbians to contribute funds. The 4th Reserve Hospital was completed before the beginning of the First Balkan War and with 140 beds and new equipment was able to assist some 1,500 patients.

For ten and a half months, beginning in October 1912, Luković rarely left the hospital, tending the wounded. Then during the Second Balkan War, she organized, at the request of the Surgeon General, respites throughout the country along the main railway lines for the troops, to provide them with soup and milk and a place to warm themselves. Organizing women in Belgrade, Lapovo, Mladenovac, Niš, Paracin, and Stalać, Luković had a network of aid stations and the staff to run them set up within one day. At the beginning of 1914, she began traveling to collect funds and organize help for the hospital and Serbian military. By the middle of the year, she was in Niš, as the state administration relocated there at the outbreak of World War I. In late January 1915, Luković traveled from Niš to Valjevo to deliver relief funds which had arrived from England. She stayed twelve days helping at the hospital there and contracted typhus.

== Death and legacy ==
Luković died at the Valjevo Hospital on 11 February 1915 and her body was returned to Niš for burial at the request of her family. On 22 February 1925, she was posthumously awarded the Florence Nightingale Medal.
