= Archbishop of Durrës =

Archbishop of Durrës (Latin: Dyrrachium) may refer to:

- Eastern Orthodox Archbishop of Durrës, historical title of senior prelates of the Albanian Orthodox Church
- Roman Catholic Archbishop of Durrës, historical title of Roman Catholic Archbishops of Tirana-Durrës

== See also ==
- Durrës (disambiguation)
