= Drač County =

County in the Kingdom of Serbia

Drač County Драчки округ
- county of Kingdom of Serbia
- 1912–1913
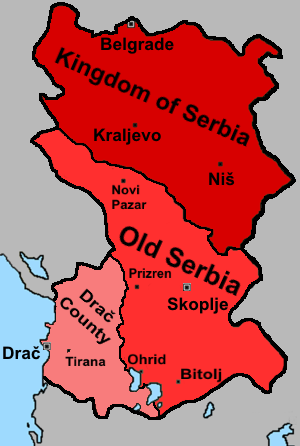
- Map of the territory with respect to the rest of Serbia and its occupied regions
- Capital: Drač (Durrës)
- History
  - First Balkan War: 29 November 1912
  - Disestablished: April 1913
Preceded by	Succeeded by
Ottoman Empire	Independent Albania
- Today part of: Albania

Drač County (Serbian: Драчки округ/Drački okrug) was one of the counties of the Kingdom of Serbia established on 29 November 1912 on the part of the territory of Albania taken from the Ottoman Empire during the First Balkan War. Drač County had four districts (Serbian: срез, romanized: srez): Drač (Durrës), Lješ (Lezhë), Elbasan and Tirana. The army of the Kingdom of Serbia retreated from Durrës in April 1913.

== Establishment ==
The Royal Serbian Army captured city of Durazzo (Albanian: Durrës) on 29 November 1912 without facing opposition. Orthodox Christian metropolitan of Durrës Jakob gave a particularly warm welcome to the new authorities. He also secured friendly relations with the Serbian authorities in the region. As such he successfully intervened to them and several Albanian guerrilla units were saved and avoided execution.

The Kingdom of Serbia established district offices and appointed the governor of the county, mayor of the city, and commander of the military garrison. The first military governor of the city of Durrës, captain Branislav Milosavljević (commander of vanguard of Šumadijan unit), appointed the first city council which included Petar Djurasković (chairman), Hristo Spiro, Mehmed Efendi and others.

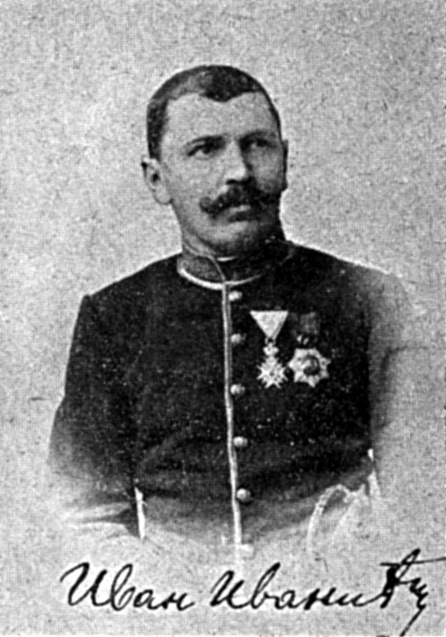
Ivan Ivanić, the first governor of Durrës County

The first governor of Drač County was Ivan Ivanić, a Serbian diplomat. His wife Delfa, one of the founders of the Circle of Serbian Sisters, chaired the city hospital. The first mayor of Durrës was Petar Đurašković, a member of a family from this city, while members of the city council were Hristos Spiro, Imam Husein Efendi and Filip Serić. When the army of Kingdom of Serbia occupied Albania in 1912, Dragutin Anastasijević was engaged as a translator for the Greek language and, after a while, he was appointed as governor of Drač County instead of Ivan Ivanić.

Serbia's most important goal of the Balkan Wars was access to the open sea.

== Persecution of locals ==
During occupation, the Serbian army killed and brutalized numerous Albanian civilians. Reported by impartial observers were instances of mass murder of Muslim and even Christian civilians. Many of the victims were woman, children, and the elderly. Beatings of Albanian civilians and looting were also commonplace.

Locals were also subjected to forced mass conversions to Orthodox Christianity. Catholic Albanians would regularly be imprisoned without trial. Other atrocities took place outside of Drač, including areas in Kosovo and Macedonia, which saw greater violence.

== Disestablishment ==
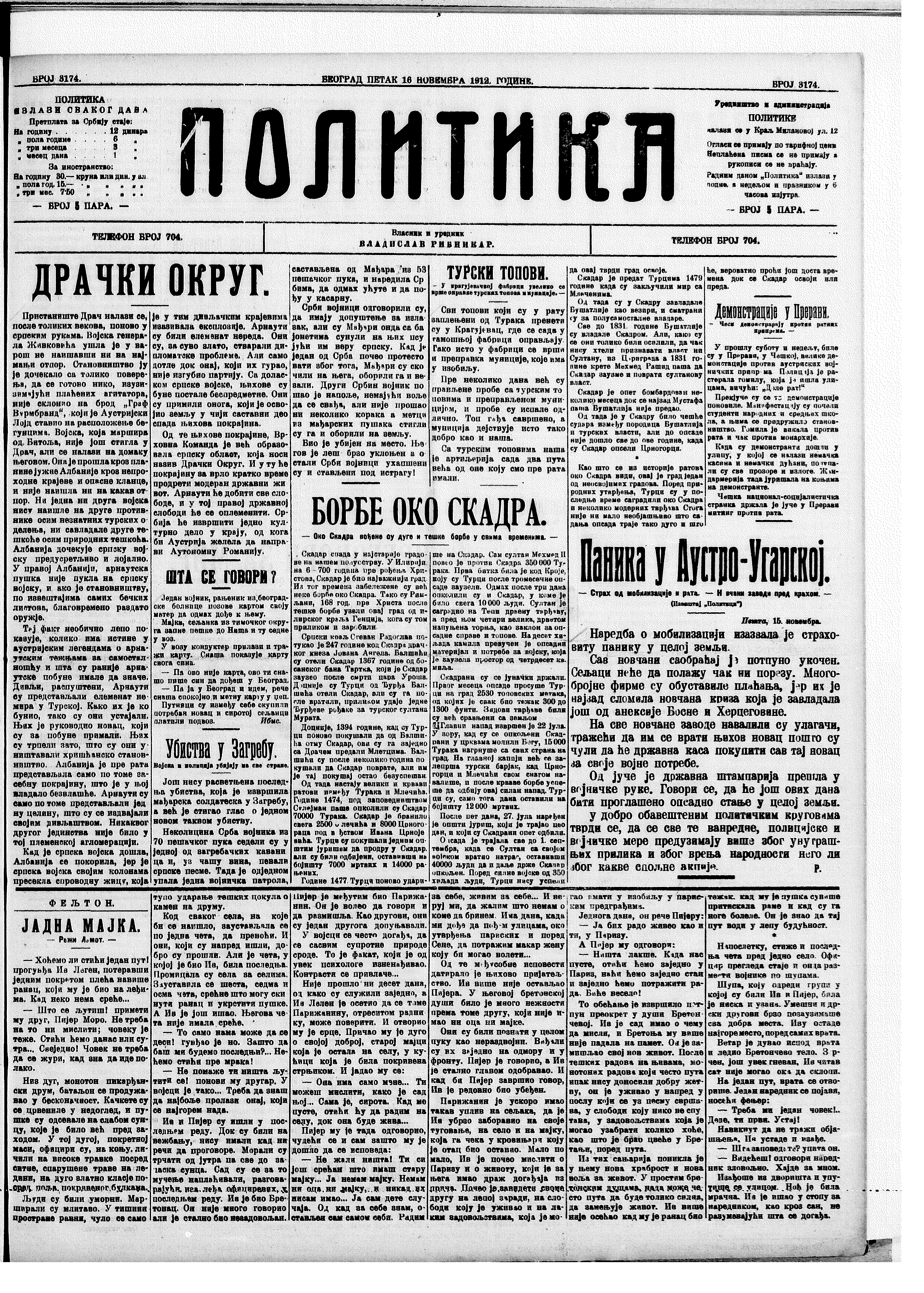
Front page of Politika of November 29, 1912 with information about establishing of Durrës County

The army of the Kingdom of Serbia retreated from Durrës in April 1913 under pressure of the naval fleet of Great Powers, but it remained in other parts of Albania for the next two months.
