= Darinka Mirković Borović =

- Born: 18 January 1896; Pljevlja
- Died: 8 February 1979 (aged 83); Belgrade
- Resting place: Belgrade New Cemetery
- Known for: Work during World War I, humanitarian work with Circle of Serbian Sisters
- Spouse(s): Stanislav Staš Milovanović (m. 1914; died 1914), Petar Borovic (m. 1920; died 1953)
- Children: 2
- Medical career
- Profession: Nurse
- Institutions: Valjevo Hospital
- Awards: Albanian Commemorative Medal

Darinka Mirković Borović (18 January 1896 – 8 February 1979) was a Montenegrin nurse during World War I and a bearer of the Albanian Commemorative Medal. She worked in the Valjevo Hospital in Serbia, and in Marseille, where wounded and sick Serbian soldiers were evacuated. After the war she was active in humanitarian societies and the Circle of Serbian Sisters.

== Biography ==
Darinka Mirković Borović was born in Pljevlja on 18 January 1896. Her father owned a cafe. There, she met a young lieutenant of the Serbian army, Stanislav Staš Milovanović, from Belgrade. After marriage in the summer of 1914, they moved to Belgrade, but Milovanović is killed during military service at Mačkov in September 1914. Borović trained as a nurse, in order to help the wounded. She worked in the Valjevo Hospital and on the battlefields. She survived the crossing to Albania and in 1917, she reached Marseille, where wounded and sick Serbian soldiers were evacuated. Borović was later awarded the Albanian Commemorative Medal.

In Marseille, Borović met pharmacist Petar Borovic, born in Šibenik, who worked in the Allied medical treatment. They married in 1920 in Belgrade, where they continued to live. Petar Borovic opened a pharmacy and Darinka opened a store selling corsets and women's underwear, and opened a workshop making trusses and belts for ailments such as hernias. The couple had two sons, who both became doctors.

Borović was active in humanitarian societies and the Circle of Serbian Sisters, She was a great friend of Queen Maria of Yugoslavia. Borović helped organize many charity events to raise funds for hospitals, schools, and orphanages.

Petar Borovic's pharmacy was destroyed during bombing in the Second World War.

Borović died on 8 February 1979 in Belgrade and is buried in the Belgrade New Cemetery. Her husband Petar predeceased her, dying in 1953.
