= Malagurski =

Malagurski is a surname. Notable people with the surname include:

- Boris Malagurski (born 1988), Serbian-Canadian film director, producer, writer and television presenter
- Sanja Malagurski (born 1990), Serbian volleyball player

== See also ==
- Mara Đorđević-Malagurski (1894–1971), Serbian writer and ethnographer
