= Ivan Ivanić =

Serbian diplomat and writer

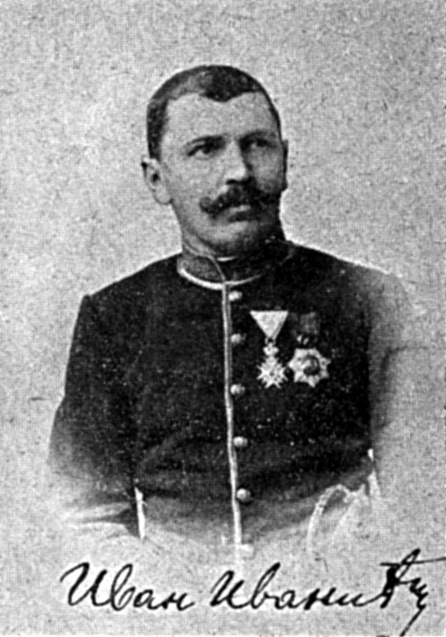
- Ivan Ivanić
- Born: Ivan Ivanić; 24 April 1867; Bačko Gradište, Bečej, Austria-Hungary
- Died: 31 January 1935 (aged 67); Belgrade, Kingdom of Yugoslavia

Ivan Ivanić (Bačko Gradište, Bečej, Austria-Hungary, 24 April 1867 – Belgrade, Kingdom of Yugoslavia, 31 January 1935) was a Serbian diplomat of the Kingdom of Serbia and author of numerous ethnographical works about Serbia and the Balkans. He also wrote travel literature about the region of Old Serbia.

== Biography ==
He began his diplomatic career as a secretary in the Serbian consulate in Priština. He later became vice consul and consul in Priština and Skopje (Kosovo Vilayet). He was later appointed as consul in Bitola (then Monastir Vilayet).

He participated in both public and secret Serbian activities to provide assistance to Macedonian rebels against the Ottoman Empire. He met his wife Delfa in Skopje, where she was a teacher between 1900 and 1903. She was one of the founders of the Circle of Serbian Sisters (Serbian: Kolo Srpskih Sestara), an organization whose establishment was proposed by Ivan Ivanić together with Branislav Nušić. They were childless and the name of their stepdaughter was Ivanka.

On 29 November 1912 he was appointed as the first governor of the Durrës County, while his wife Delfa led the city hospital in Durrës.

Besides his work as diplomat, Ivanić was editor of numerous magazines published in Serbian. In April 1887 he became the editor of "Sremac". Ivanić was one of two editors of the first issue of the magazine "Vardar". He also edited the magazine "Golub" which was published in 1905 in Istanbul and distributed to Serbs in the Ottoman Empire.

Ivanić added his personal notes in works about Kosovo, Macedonia and the Serbian Orthodox Church and those notes were subject of different opinions of later researchers.

== Selected works ==
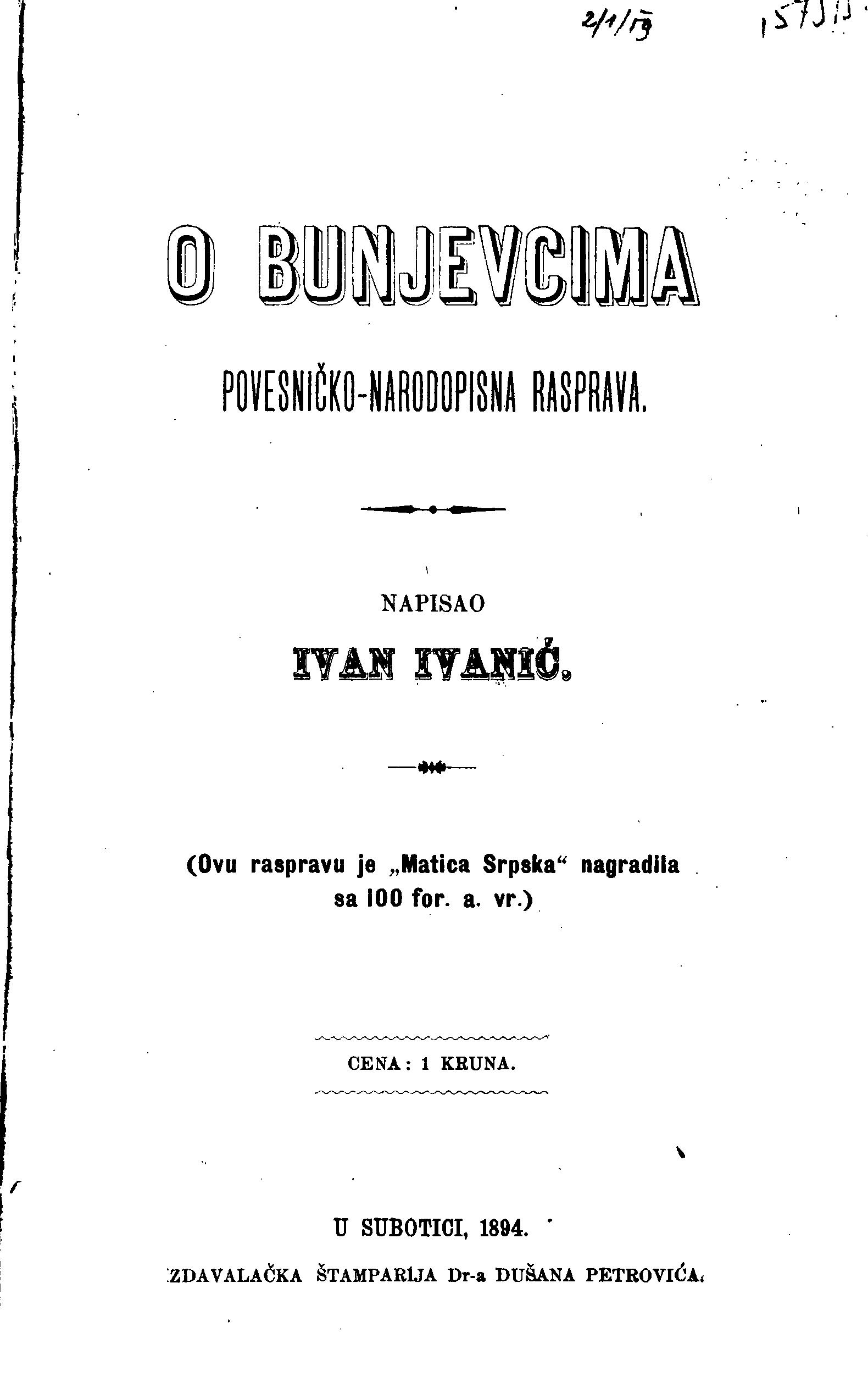

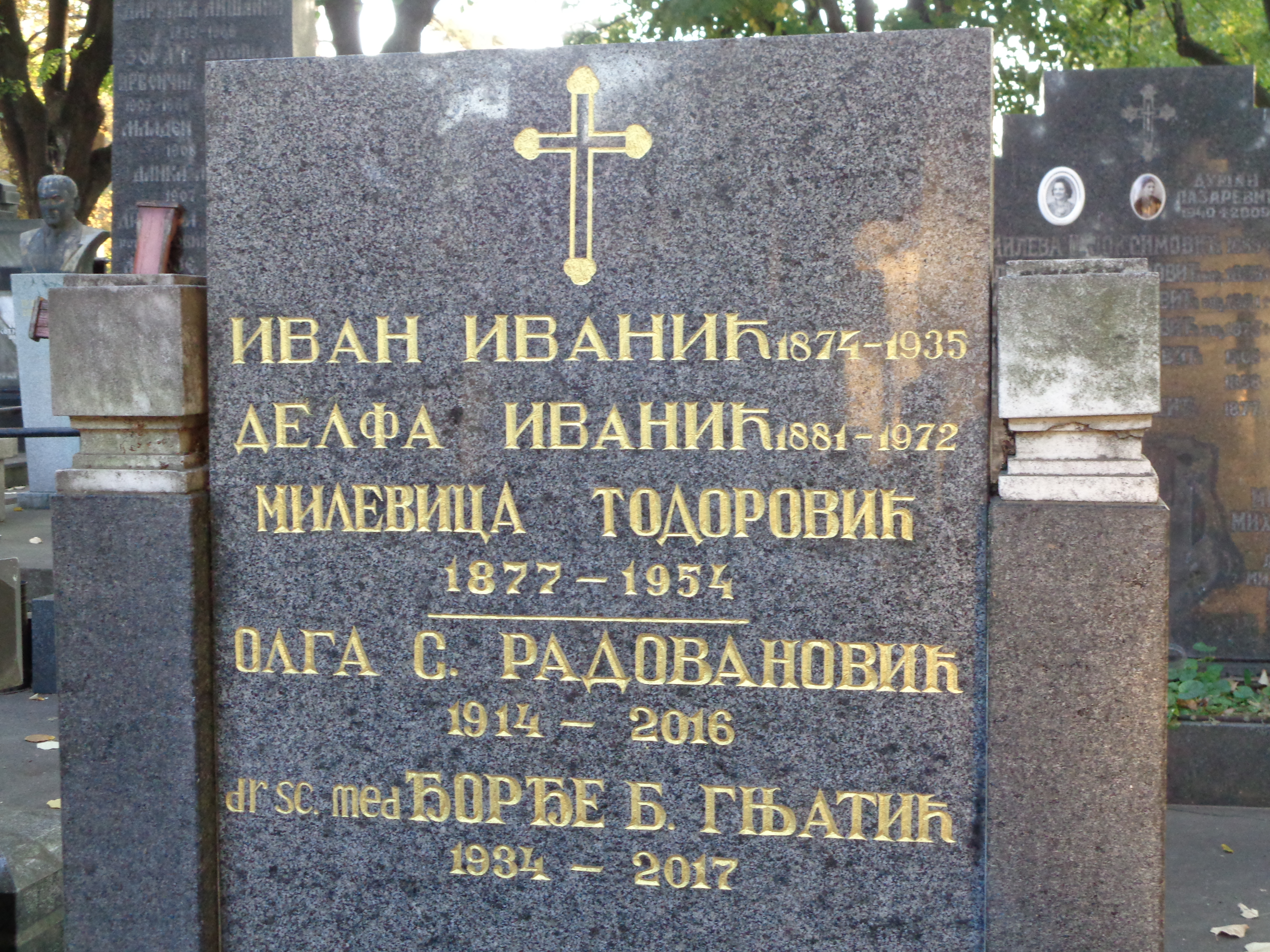
Belgrade New Cemetery

- Iz tame života : pripovetke i crte (From the darkness of life, stories and notes) (in Serbian), Belgrade: Štamp. M. Jovanovića, 1891, OCLC 27606387
- O Bunjevcima : povesničko-narodopisna rasprava (About Bunjevci: Historical-peoplewritten debate) (in Serbian), Subotica: Izdavalačka štamp. D. Petrovića, 1894, OCLC 26970392, archived from the original on July 23, 2011
- Bunjevic i Šokci u Bačkoj, Baranji i Lici : istorija, etnografija, kultura, društveno, brojno i privredno stanje, etničke osobine (Bunjevci and Šokci in Bačka, Baranja and Lika: history, ethnography, culture, society, size and economy, ethnic characteristics (in Serbian), Belgrade: Štamp. D. Dimitrijevića, 1899, OCLC 7698894
- Mita Lukić (1889), Srbi u Ugarskoj i crkvena unija (Serbs in Hungary and church union) (in Serbian), Belgrade: Štamp. Narodne Radikalne Stranke, OCLC 30566625
- Из црквене историје срба у Турској у XVIII. и XIX. веку. (From church history of Serbs in Turkey in 18th and 19th century) (in Serbian), 1902, OCLC 557842186
- Na Kosovu sa šara po Kosovu na Zvečan : iz putnih beležaka (On Kosovo from Šara on Kosovo to Zvečan) (in Serbian), Belgrade: Izd. M. Arsenijevića, 1903, OCLC 27182629
- На Косову ... Из путних бележака И. Иванића. (On Kosovo... From the travel notes of Ivan Ivanić (in Serbian), 1903, OCLC 560448685
- Маћедонија и Маћедонци. Путописне белешке, etc. (Macedonia and Macedonians. Travel notes etc.) (in Serbian), 1906, OCLC 560448674
- French, English and German bibliography, concerning Serbia and the Serbs, London: Gale & Polden, ltd., 1907, OCLC 38782750
- Geografija, kartografija, granice. (Geography, cartography, borders) (in Serbian), Novi Sad: Knjižare Natoševića, 1908, OCLC 249763707
- Rumuni u Maćedoniji i epiru. Istorija, kultura, statistika = Les Roumains de la Macedoine et l'Epire. Histoire, culture, statistique (in Serbian), Novi Sad, 1909, OCLC 42392932
- Srpske manastirske, seoske i varoške škole u Turskoj; Kultura Srpska u staroj Srbiji i Makedoniji od Xv do XX veka.(Serbian monastery, village and urban schools in Turkey; Serbian culture in Old Serbia and Macedonia from 15th to 20th century (in Serbian), Belgrade, 1913–1914, OCLC 41989619
