= Kasija Miletić =

Serbian volunteer nurse in World War I

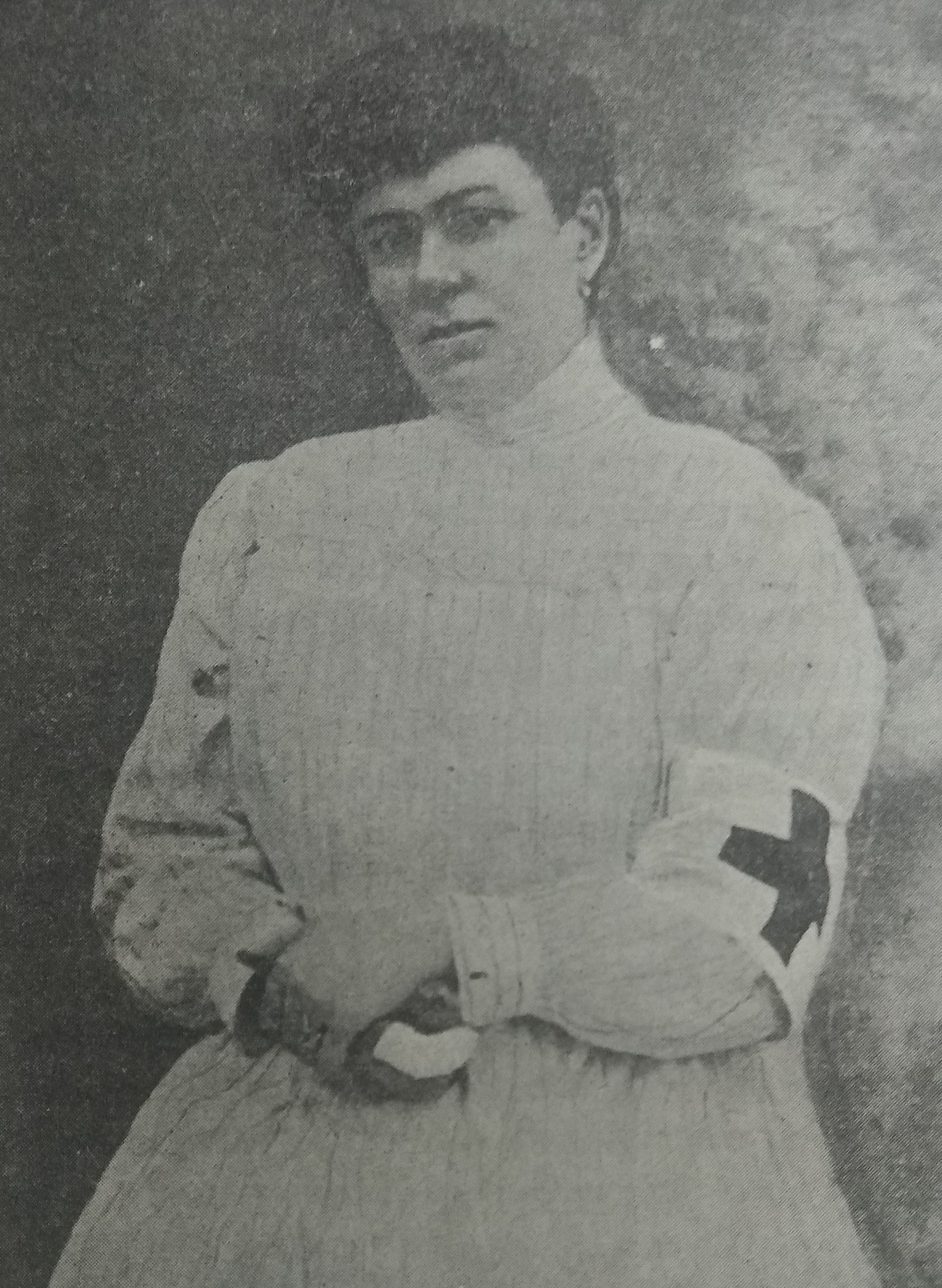
Kasija Miletić in 1921.

Kasija Miletić (ca. 1875–1915) was a prominent member of the Circle of Serbian Sisters and a volunteer nurse in World War I.

== Biography ==
Kasija Đokić was born around 1875. Miletić was a socially-active young woman and with Delfa Ivanić became one of the founders of the Circle of Serbian Sisters. When the Great War broke out she went to the front as a volunteer nurse. While tending patients at the Valjevo Military Hospital, she contracted typhus. She died in the Valjevo Military Hospital in 1915.
