= Draginja Babić =

Serbian physician

Draginja Babić (3 October 1886 – 24 January/6 February 1915) was a Serbian medical doctor who worked at Valjevo Hospital during the Balkan Wars and World War I. She was a recipient of the Order of St. Sava.

== Early years and education ==
Draginja Babić was born in Valjevo, 3 October 1886, into a family of merchants, Janko Babić and Jelena Jelka (née Mišković or Mitrović. Her father was president of Valjevo municipality, 1892–1893, as was her brother, Marko Babić, in the period before the Second World War. Her brother, Jovan Babić, was a professor of Serbian language and a writer, and her sister, Marija (married surname, Tadić), was a pharmacist.

In Valjevo, Babić finished elementary school and lower gymnasium classes. In Belgrade, she graduated from the Third Belgrade Gymnasium in 1905. She began her medical studies at the University of Zurich in 1906. where she was a scholar of Valjevo municipality, continuing her studies from 1908/09 in Berlin and ending them in December 1911. She was the first Serbian woman to complete medical studies at the University of Berlin, at the age of 25. Babić became a doctor at a time when women doctors in Serbia were very rare. Because she was a great student, the faculty wanted to keep Babić at the University of Berlin, but she decided to return to Serbia.

== Career ==
Babić began her career in Valjevo as an assistant doctor in the District Hospital, then she passed the state exam and worked as a municipal doctor. During the Balkan Wars, she served as director and was the only physician at Valjevo's Reserve Military Hospital. During World War I, she also worked in Valjevo as a doctor. During the Balkan wars, she served as a reserve hospital manager. During the First World War, following the break-up of the Austro-Hungarian troops in 1914, she withdrew with the Serbian army to Pirot where she was the manager of the District Hospital.

After the Battle of Kolubara, Babić returned to Valjevo. At that time, there was a large epidemic of Typhoid fever in Serbia caused by interaction with the Austro-Hungarian soldiers. In the Valjevo hospital, the situation was particularly difficult, and hundreds of people died daily. At the time when everyone was fleeing from Valjevo, Babić returned to her hometown to help the sick. There she selflessly sacrificed herself for the good of others, herself suffering from Typhoid fever.

Babić was decorated with the Order of St. Sava in 1913. She died in Valjevo between 24 January and 6 February 1915. Her father died three days later. Babić was among the first medical personnel who were victimized in Valjevo. Doctors Pavle Vojteh and Selimir Đorđević, as well as a volunteer nurse, Nadežda Petrović, who was also a painter, also died of typhoid in 1914–15.
