= Durrës (disambiguation) =

Durrës is a city in west-central Albania on the Adriatic Sea within the Mediterranean Sea.

Durrës may also refer to:

- Durrës County, an administrative county surrounding Durrës
- Durrës District, a former administrative district surrounding Durrës
- Durrës County (Kingdom of Serbia), a former county of the Kingdom of Serbia

== See also ==
- Durazzo family
