= Mara Đorđević-Malagurski =

Serbian ethnographer

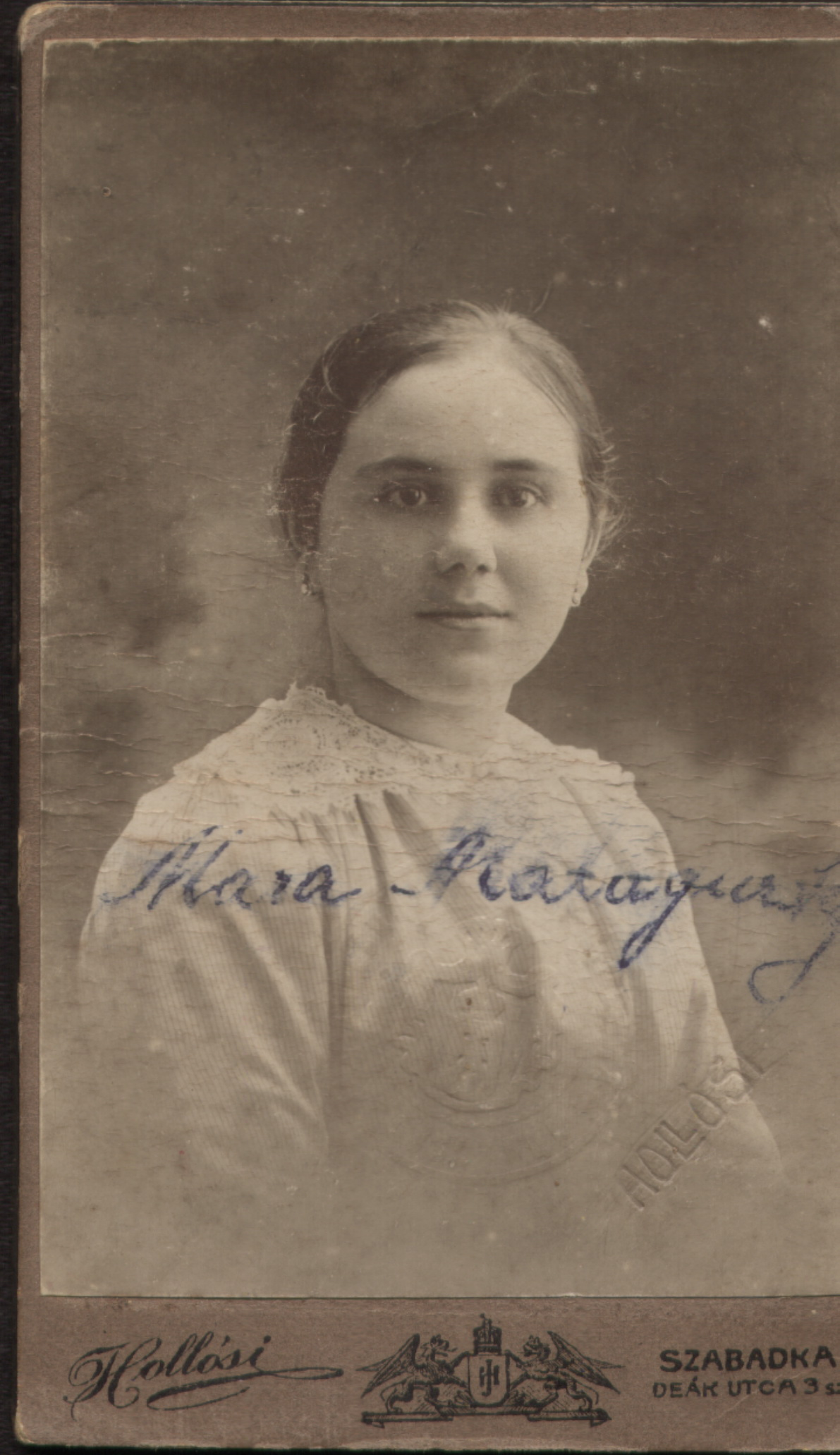
Mara Malagurski

Mara Đorđević-Malagurski (Serbian Cyrillic: Мара Ђорђевић-Малагурски; 20 December 1894 – 9 July 1971) was a Serbian writer and ethnographer. Alongside Lazarus Stipić, a librarian at the public library in Subotica, she was one of the few prominent figures from the Bunjevci.

== Biography ==
Mara Malagurski was born in Subotica. Like many female school students in Subotica (Subotica City Museum) she originates from the Bunjevac Malagurski-Ćurčić family. Her grandfather, Ice Malagurski, was the first president of the Bunjevci cultural association "Pučke Kasine", founded in 1878. Her father was named Josip and her mother Hristina (born Stantić). Malagurski was educated at The Štrosmajerovo Institute in Đakovo, and then moved on to higher education at a school for women in Subotica. In addition, she studied English in London.

When the Grand National Assembly was held in Novi Sad (1918), she was one of the seven female delegates, and at the same time one of the members of the delegation that opted for the annexation of Vojvodina into the Kingdom of Serbia, and not the State of Slovenes, Croats or Serbs. She married senator and professor Dragoslav Djordjevic in 1919. She relocated to Belgrade in the beginning of 1929.

In Subotica she founded the Bunjevac Catholic Women's Society and the Dilettante Society (1911). In addition, she took part in the development of the Bunjevac Center of Educational Heritage (1927), and as its first president organized exhibitions of folk crafts, theater and so on. She led Subotians to Belgrade to appear in traditional robes in front of the royal family and Radio Belgrade. She was a board member of the Circle of Serbian Sisters and after the end of World War II, a member of the Association of Writers of Serbia.

In the first half of the 20th century together with some other pro-Serbian Bunjevac authors, Mara Đorđević-Malagurski in several publications and newspaper articles presented theses which deny that Bunjevci belong to the Croatian nation and that Bunjevci are in fact fourth South Slavic tribe. After World War II she withdrew from public life probably because of political beliefs and decree from 1945 when the communist authorities incorporate all Bunjevci to the Croatian nation.

== Papers ==
Her literary, ethnographic and other original works (before the 1918th g), were published on the Bunjevac list of "Neven" under the pseudonym of Nevenka.

Beginning in 1925, she published in: Vardar, Agricultural calendars, Literary North, Thought, Journal of the Yugoslav Association of Professors, newspapers and the Bunjevac calendar. She wrote the play Manda Vojnić and various booklets about Bunjevac national costumes and customs.

== Awards ==
For the story Vita Đanina i Druge Pripovetke iz Bunjevačkog Života she was awarded the SANU award at the Cvijete Zuzorić competition in 1928, and received the Order of St. Sava V level, White Eagle V level, the Russian Red Cross and Cross of Russian War Veterans.

== Work ==
- Bunjevački Običaji u Slikama, Subotica 1926.
- Vita Đanina i Druge Pripovetke iz Bunjevačkog Života, Beograd 1933.
- Stara Bunjevačka Nošnja i Vez, Subotica 1941.
- Bunjevka o Bunjevcima, Subotica 1941.
