= Mirka Grujić =

Serbian volunteer nurse

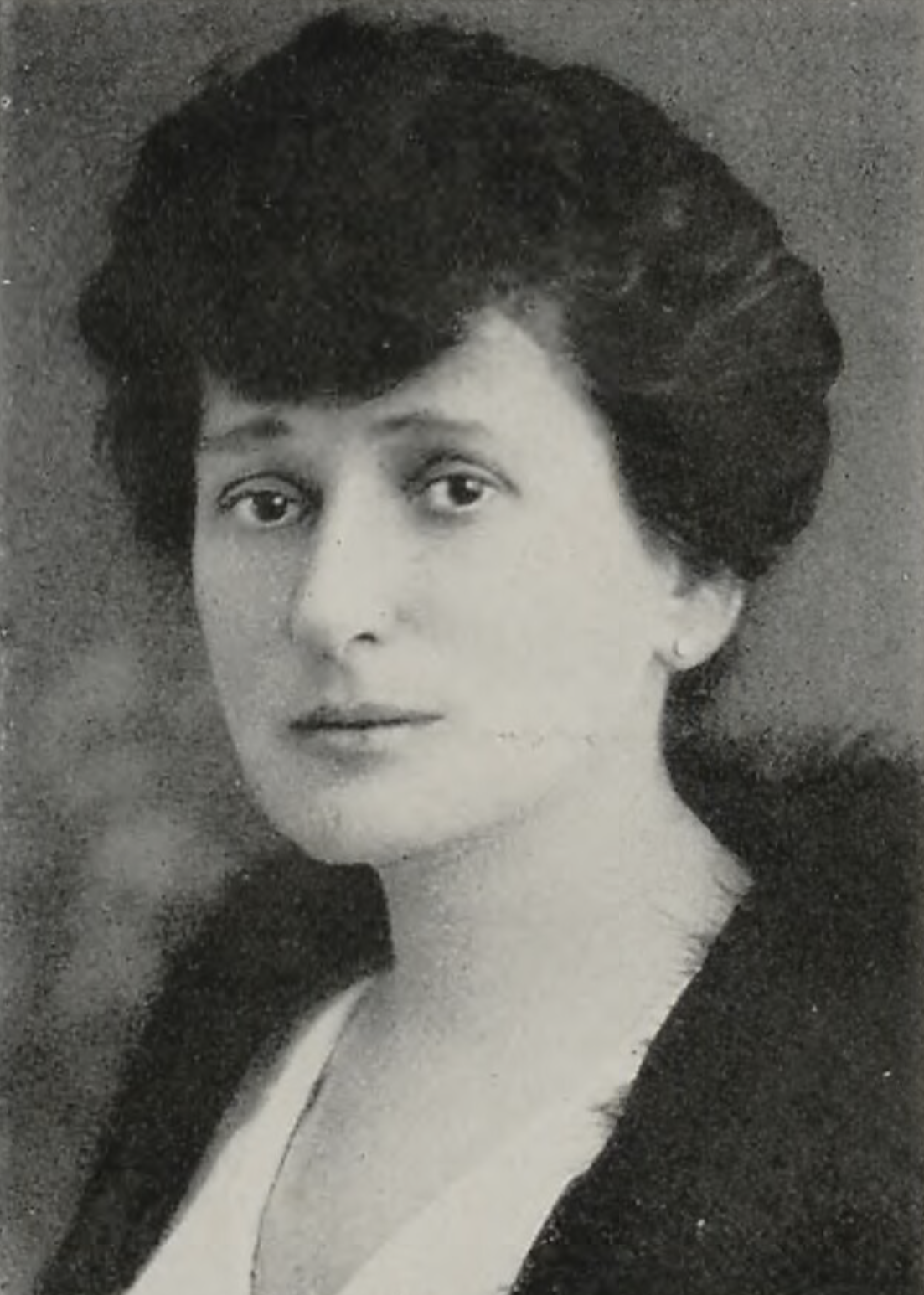
Mirka J. Grujić (c. 1920)

Mirka Grujić (Belgrade, 1869–1940) was a Serbian volunteer nurse during World War I, president of the Circle of Serbian Sisters, and was the honorary first lady-in-waiting of Queen Maria of Yugoslavia.

== Biography ==
Mirka Grujić was one of ten children of Jelena and Jevrem Grujić, the Serbian statesman and diplomat. She was highly educated and intelligent. She spoke five languages, painted, played the harpsichord. During the First Balkan War, Second Balkan War, and World War I, Grujić joined the volunteer medical corps as a nurse. She took part in the retreat across Albania and remained with the army until the liberation of Serbia, when she returned to Belgrade. For her work as a nurse, she was given the Medal for Bravery. After the war, she became the president of the Circle of Serbian Sisters, whose member she was prior to World War I. In that position, she took care of the poor, the ill, orphans, and helped educate young girls.
