= Circle of Serbian Sisters =

Serbian women's charitable society

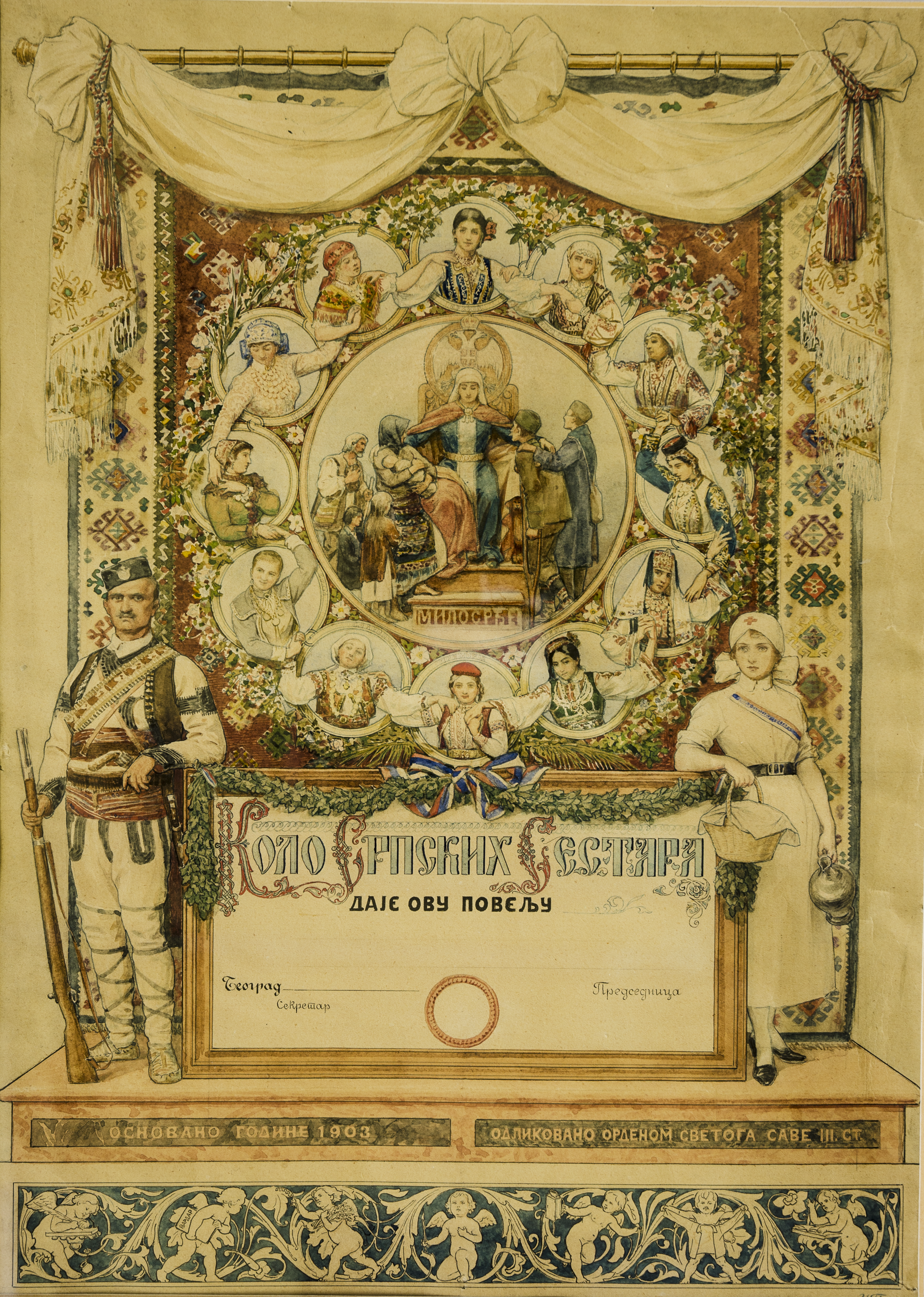
The Charter of the Circle of Serbian Sisters (1922) by Uroš Predić

The Circle of Serbian Sisters (Serbian: Kolo Srpskih Sestara) was a women's charitable society established in Belgrade in 1903. Among the founders of the society were Mabel Grujić, wife of Slavko J. Grujić, Blanš Vesnić, wife of Milenko Vesnić, and after the May coup in Serbia (1903), the society was led by Nadežda Petrović, Delfa Ivanić, Draga Ljočić, Andjelija Stančić, Branislav Nušić and Ivan Ivanić.

Regional organisations of the Circle of Serbian Sisters have been established in many areas where Serbs live. After the restoration of the Circle in 1990, the regional organisation Circle operates within the diocese of the Serbian Orthodox Church.

== History ==
Its establishment was first proposed by Ivan Ivanić and Branislav Nušić. However, the organizers were Nadežda Petrović, famous expressionist painter, Delfa Ivanić, a teacher, and Savka Subotić, activist (wife of Jovan Subotić).

Its first president was Savka Subotić, who resigned in 1905. Ljubica Luković was then elected president and served for the next decade until her death. Under Luković's leadership, the organization organized and supported nurse's training courses, established the IV Reserve Hospital in the Vračar neighborhood and created a network of aid stations along the major railway lines in the country to assist troops by providing with hot drinks, food, and medical attention during the First and Second Balkan Wars and at the beginning of World War II.

Although known for its charitable work, the Circle of Serbian Sisters also helped the Serbian Chetnik Organization in the Turkish-held lands of Southern Serbia, and aided the wounded and stricken as Kosovo Maiden did in medieval times.

== Building ==
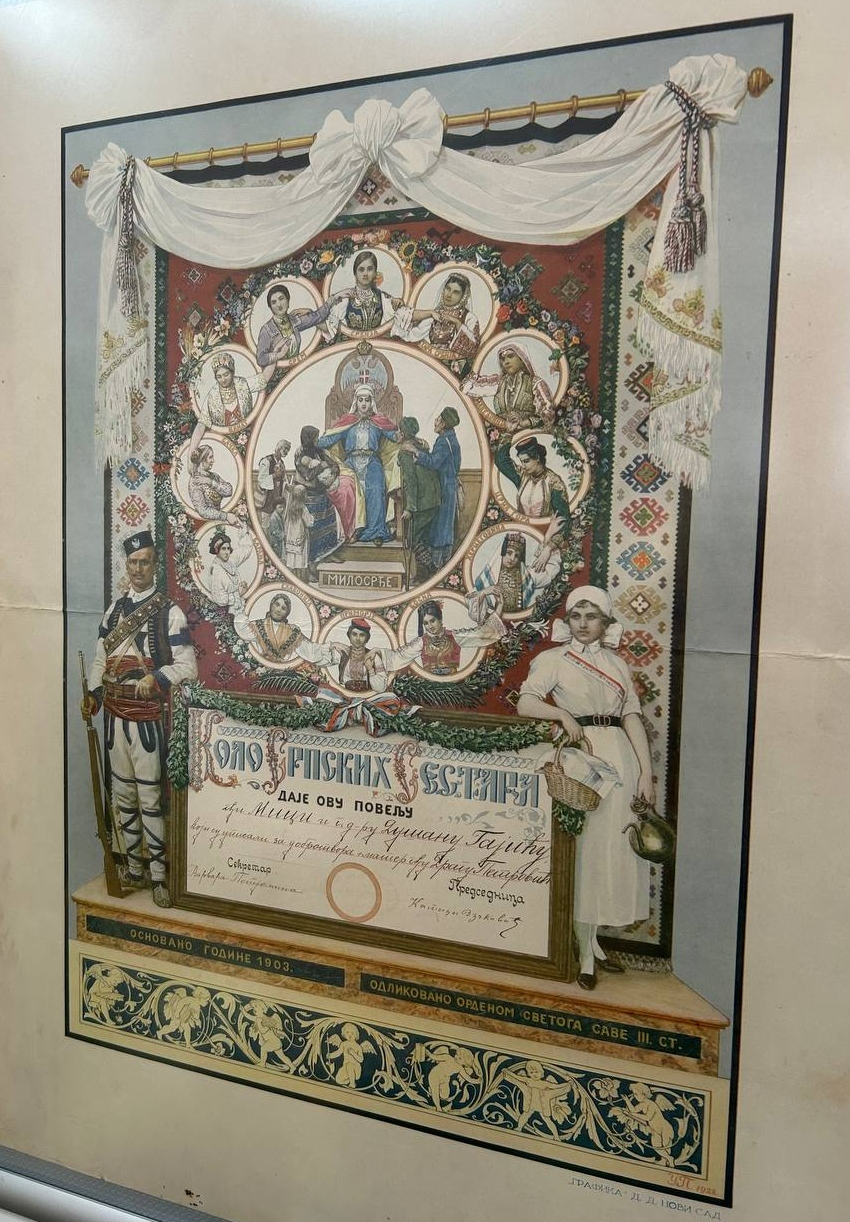

The Headquarters of the Circle of Serbian Sisters was located in Resavska 11 Street in Belgrade. The building, decorated in Art Nouveau style, housed the Circle between 1903 up until 1942. Today the building is used by the folklore society "Ivo Lola Ribar", who organize performances there.

== Notable people ==
- Nadežda Petrović
- Darinka Mirković Borović
- Mara Đorđević-Malagurski
- Mirka Grujić
- Delfa Ivanić
- Ljubica Luković
- Kasija Miletić
- Savka Subotić

== See also ==
- Women's Society of Belgrade
- Women's Antifascist Front of Yugoslavia
