= Savka Subotić =

Serbian feminist (1834-1918)

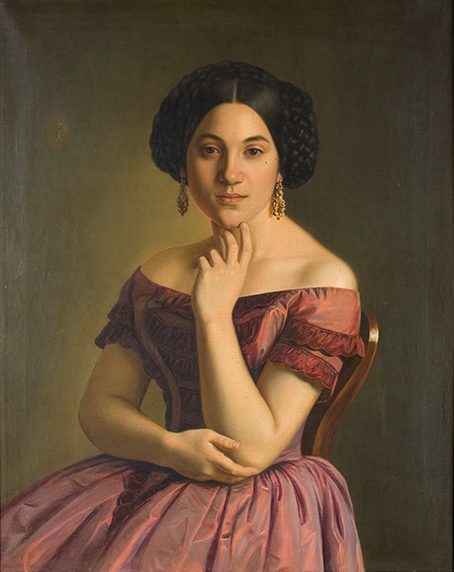

Savka Subotić (Serbian Cyrillic: Савка Суботић; 11 October 1834 – 1918) was a Serbian political activist, philanthropist, and one of the first leading feminists in Vojvodina. She organized the Serbian suffrage movement which helped women win the right to vote. Subotić served as the first president of the Kolo Srpskih Sestara, (Circle of Serbian Sisters).

== Life ==
She was born on 11 October 1834 in Novi Sad, at the time in the Austrian Empire. She was born into a wealthy and respectable family, of mixed Serb-Greek origin, to father, Jovan Polit, and mother, Julijana Desančić. family was of Serb-Greek origin. Her brother was Mihailo Polit-Desančić. At the age of four, she was sent to a private girls' school for primary education. At that time in Europe, primary education was not as compulsory for female as for male children. A large home library also made a great contribution to her education. From 1846 to 1848, she was educated in Timișoara. With the outbreak of the Hungarian uprising and the Serbian-Hungarian war of 1848, the living conditions of her family significantly deteriorated, so it also affected her schooling. Subotić continued her education in Vienna, where, in 1851, she married Jovan Subotić, a doctor of law, writer and politician. Later, she returned to Novi Sad with her husband, but often changed her place of residence, owing to her husband's demanding political career.

They had seven children: Dejana, Žarka, Vida, Verica, Vojislava, Branislava and Ozren. Zarko and Vida died as children, and Vojislav became a famous doctor.

== Career ==
Subotić advocated the construction of Serbian girls' colleges. Its goal was to improve the position of women in society and to ensure that education is not focused only on men. She believed that women were not destined only for the role of mother and housewife, but that they had the right to education and work. She fought to raise awareness among women that the strictly patriarchal community should be changed. Above all, she wanted to do that with women who lived in better economic conditions, so that they could influence others. That is why Subotić was considered one of the first feminists in Vojvodina. In Novi Sad, she founded the First Women's Cooperative, which helped poor girls to study for a teaching career, and other similar organizations.

She was the first president of the Kolo Srpskih Sestara (Circle of Serbian Sisters). Her contemporaries were Draginja Ružić. Draga Dejanović, Marija Trandafil, Milka Grgurova-Aleksić and others. Subotić also left records of many famous and important personalities from the second half of the 19th century and the beginning of the 20th century. She was familiar with the works of Immanuel Kant and Arthur Schopenhauer.

She died in 1918, during World War I, when Novi Sad was being liberated by the Serbian Army, to become part of the Kingdom of Serbia. She was buried in Zemun, in a family tomb.

== Selected works ==
=== Monographs ===
- Govor gospođe Savke d-r J. Subotića: držan u sali Velike Škole 5. oktobra 1903. godine: prvo predavanje Kola srpskih sestara 1903/"Speech by Mrs. Savka Dr. Jovan Subotić: held in the hall of the Velika škola on 5 October 1903: the first lecture of the Circle of Serbian Sisters", 1903
- Žena na istoku i na zapadu 1911/Women in the East and the West, 1911
- Gedanken über die nationale, soziale und Frauenfrage von Savka Subotić 1911/"Notes on national, social and women's questions" by Savka Subotić, 1911
- Uspomene 2001/Memoirs, 2001

=== Articles and other similar texts ===
- Govor gđe Savke Subotićke 1892/Speech by Mrs. Savka Subotić in 1892
- O razvitku naših narodnih ženskih rukotvorina 1895/On the development of our folk women's handicrafts in 1895
- Kako da zaštitimo našu domaću industriju 1898/How to protect our domestic industry in 1898
- Govor 1898/Speech of 1898
- O Jovanu Subotiću 1904/About Jovan Subotić in 1904
- Srpska crkva u Zagrebu 1906/Serbian Church in Zagreb 1906
- O našim narodnim tkaninama i rukotvorinama 1906/About our folk fabrics and handicrafts in 1906
- Pismo Zorki Janković 1910/Letter to Zorka Janković 1910
- Misli o nacionalnom, društvenom i ženskom pitanju 1911/Thoughts on the National, Social and Women's Issues in 1911
- Srpska majka 1913/Serbian Mother, 1913
- "Srpska žena u Pragu, 1913/"Serbian Woman in Prague, 1913
- Moja oporuka," 1914/My Volition, 1914

== Legacy ==
Immediately after Savka Subotić's death her life-long work would continue to manifest itself and solidify the role of women in the new society that was created on the rubble of World War I. Seven women participated in the Great Assembly in Novi Sad on 25 November 1918, when the secession of Vojvodina from Austro-Hungary and the annexation of the Kingdom of Serbia and the future Kingdom of Serbs, Croats and Slovenes was announced. It was then that women were given the right to vote for the first time in Europe. Later, biographies of seven exceptional women were published, including Subotić who loomed as one of the principal leaders of the Serbian women's movement.

She also has a street in Sajlovo, a neighbourhood of the city of Novi Sad, named after her.
