= Delfa Ivanić =

Serbian painter and humanitarian

Delfa Ivanić (6 March 1881 – 14 August 1972) was a Serbian painter, humanitarian and together with Savka Subotić and Nadežda Petrović, one of the founders of the Circle of Serbian Sisters. She was also a translator, writer, editor of magazines and the first Serbian woman to receive Florence Nightingale Medal.

== Biography ==
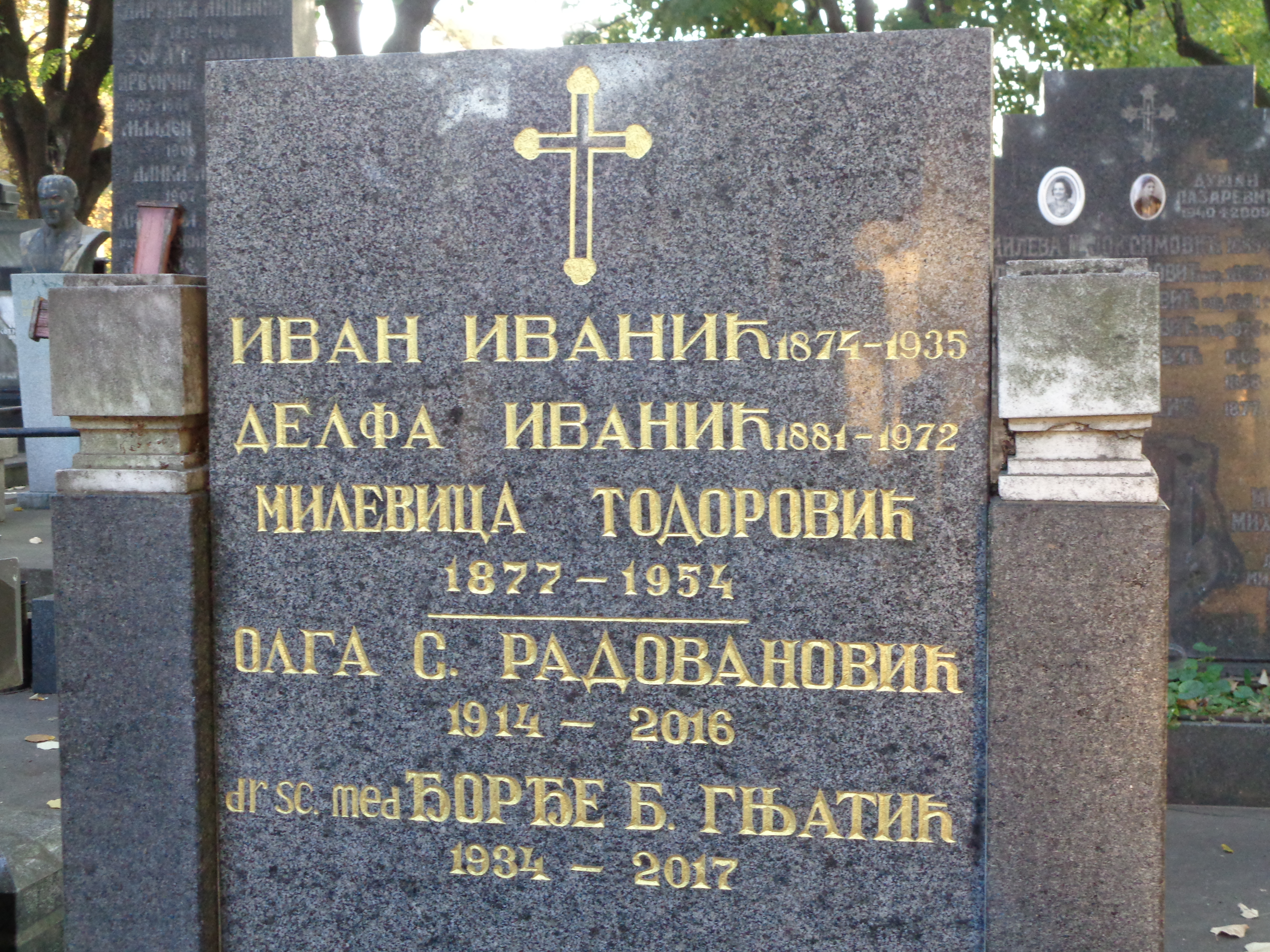
Belgrade New Cemetery

Delfa Ivanić was born in Podgorica, Montenegro, 6 March 1881. During the First Balkan War in 1912, with Walburga, Lady Paget, she established the VI Reserve Hospital for the wounded in Belgrade and in 1913, a hospital in Durrës, Albania. She founded the Serbian Support Society (Srpsko potporno udruženje) in 1915 in London. The society organized the housing of 500 Serbian schoolchildren in Oxford and Birmingham. Her humanitarian work took her to Thessaloniki, France, Trieste, and Rijeka. She returned to Belgrade in 1919. Throughout this period, she held lectures on the work of women's humanitarian societies in almost every city she found herself in during the war. She was the first Serbian woman to receive the Red Cross Florence Nightingale Medal in 1920. In 1962, she gave the Serbian Medical Society her medal. She worked as a translator, writer and editor of magazines. Delfa Ivanić was also involved in the building of the Center of the Circle of Serbian Sisters in Belgrade, which included a boarding school for girls. She was the president of the Circle from 1941 to its abolition in 1946. She died in Belgrade (at the time in SFR Yugoslavia), 14 August 1972.

== Selected works ==
- Uspomene, 2012.
- Predavanje dr Keti Širmaherove i naše ženske prilike, article, 1906.
- O srpskom narodnom ženskom savezu i njegovim zadacima, article, 1912.
- Žena na domu, u društvu i u javnom životu, article, 1912.

== Bibliography ==
- Иванић, Делфа (2012). Успомене.Приредила Јасмина Милановић. Београд: Институт за савремену историју. COBISS 191119884
- Милановић, Јасмина (2015). Делфа Иванић: заборављене успомене. Београд: Еволута. COBISS 220264972
- Милановић, Јасмина (2011). Биљана Дојчиновић (ed.). "Војска милосрђа". Књиженство. 1. Београд: Филолошки факултет Универзитета у Београду. ISSN 2217-7809.
- Пантелић, Ивана; Милинковић, Јелена; Шкодрић, Љубинка (2013). Двадесет жена које су обележиле XX век у Србији. Београд: НИН.
- Рајић, Сузана (2012). "Погледи, критике, прикази: Делфа Иванић, Успомене, Институт за новију историју Србије, Београд, 2012, приредила Јасмина Милановић" (PDF). Српске студије. 3: 438–440. Archived from the original (PDF) on 23 November 2015.
- Милановић, Јасмина (2014). Бојан Димитријевић (ed.). "Мабел Грујић и Делфа Иванић доброчинитељке српског народа" (PDF). Историја 20. века. 1. Београд: Институт за историју. ISSN 0352-3160. Archived from the original (PDF) on 22 August 2016.
