= Valjevo Hospital =

Hospital in Valjevo, Serbia

General Hospital Valjevo

Geography
- Location: Serbia
- Coordinates: 44.277423°N 19.896423°E

Organisation
- Type: General

Services
- Beds: 657 (2017)

History
- Founded: 1957; 69 years ago

Links
- Website: www.obvaljevo.rs
- Lists: Hospitals in Serbia

Valjevo Hospital is a general hospital in Valjevo, Serbia.

== War hospital in Valjevo ==
War Hospital in Valjevo became the medical symbol of sacrifice and humanity during the World War I and World War II, as it was the biggest naval hospital in the war. The Serbian government planned that in the event of war use Valjevo Hospital with at the time 2,210 beds for patients. Due to geographical position of Valjevo and it being close to the front lines, Valjevo Hospital naturally became the main center for the reception of the wounded, a large number of refugees, prisoners and patients.
