= Lenka Rabasović =

Serbian female guerrilla

- View of Bioska
- Born: Pjević; Bioska, Kingdom of Serbia
- Family: Cvijo Pjević (brother)
- Military career
- Allegiance: Kingdom of Serbia
- Service years: 1916–1918
- Nickname: She-wolf from Tara (Vučica sa Tare)
- Conflicts: World War I

Lenka Rabasović (Serbian: Ленка Рабасовић) was a Serbian female guerrilla (Chetnik) in Austro-Hungarian-occupied Serbia during World War I. Lenka (née Pjević) was born in the village of Bioska, on the foothills of the Tara mountain, near Užice in western Serbia. She had four brothers.

The Austro-Hungarian occupation of Serbia led to starvation and persecution. The Serbian army, with many civilians, was located in the deep south of the Balkans, while central Serbia was under occupation with the elderly and weak staying behind. Her brother Cvijo and some villagers became guerrillas, and in a skirmish wounded an Austrian officer, which led to a manhunt. Austrian soldiers came to the village and asked for his sister (Lenka). Her father Jevrem allowed her to also join the guerrillas. Being chased by Austro-Hungarian occupation authorities, she took to the mountains and joined the guerrillas (Chetniks) in 1916. She became an active fighter, and also courier between the Chetnik detachments in occupied territory. She was of marital age, but according to herself, "she married to the rifle". In springtime 1917 the Bioska cheta (band) numbered around 30 fighters. The band managed to capture 11 enemy soldiers at Kaluđerske Bare once, two of whom were captured by Lenka herself. She decided for the captives to be freed, with the message to their command to "get out of this land". She became known as the "Girl Wolf" and "She-wolf of Tara". One of her contacts was the teacher and Chetnik courier Ljubica Čakarević. Her brother Cvija fell on 9 August 1917. She was seriously wounded once, in the foot while leaving an ambuscade near Ražane. She awaited the liberation of Serbia in 1918. Two years after the war, she married Mališa Rabasović in Mačvanski Prnjavor and went on to have seven children.

She was featured in Politikin Zabavnik.

== See also ==
- Chetniks in the Balkan Wars – Serbian paramilitary units during the Balkan Wars
- Milunka Savić – Serbian war heroine
- Sofija Jovanović – Serbian war heroine of the Balkan Wars and World War I
- Antonija Javornik – Serbian war heroine, nurse and sergeant
- Živana Terzić – Serbian war heroine
- Mara Petrović – Serbian war heroine
- Flora Sandes – First World War soldier and nurse (1876–1956)
- Leslie Joy Whitehead – Canadian female soldier
- Women in the military – Women participating in military activities

== Sources ==
- Baćković, Nemanja (2019). "С ОКРАЈКА ИСТОРИЈЕ: ВУЧИЦА СА ТАРЕ". Politikin Zabavnik.
- Đurić, Antonije (1987). Žene-Solunci govore. NIRO "Književne novine". ISBN 978-86-391-0042-1.
- Garić, Slavko (2020-09-20). "СРПСКА ХЕРОИНА: Ленка је у рату била неустрашива, а у миру је била мајка седморо деце". ИСКРА.
- Živković, Jasmina (2014). "Хероине са пушком у руци" [Heroines with rifle in hand]. Zapisi. 3. Istorijski arhiv Požarevac: 99-.
