= Slavka Tomić =

Serbian war heroine

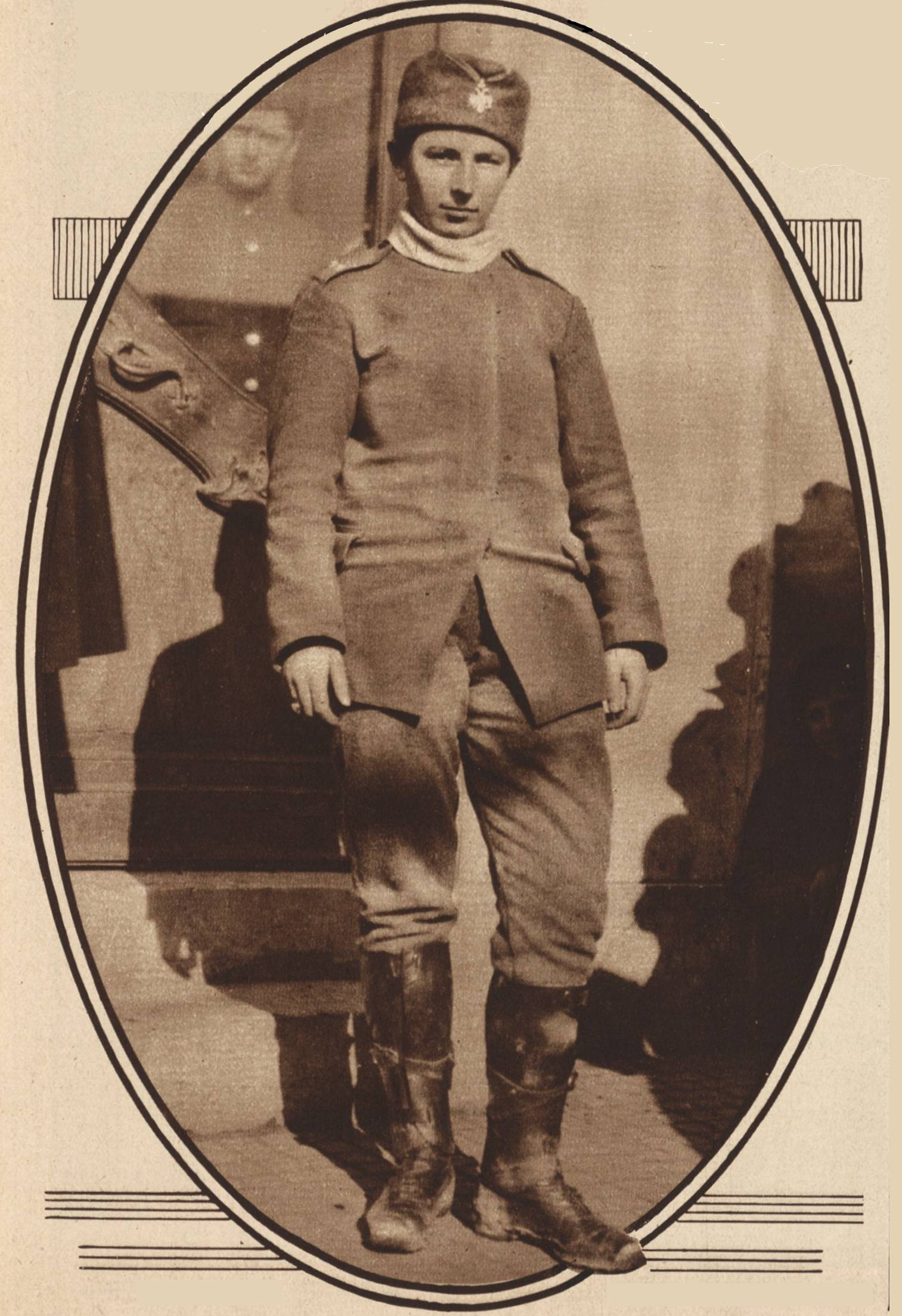
- Slavka Tomić
- Military career
- Allegiance: Kingdom of Serbia
- Service years: 1914–
- Conflicts: World War I

Slavka Tomić was a Serbian 17-year-old girl who joined the Serbian Army battalion of major Voja Tankosić. She participated in the Serbian army's retreat through Albania (winter 1915–16). Tomić was decorated with the military medal.

== See also ==
- Milunka Savić
- Antonija Javornik
- Flora Sandes
- Leslie Joy Whitehead
- Women in the military
- Sofija Jovanović
