= Marina Veličković =

Marina Veličković wearing her orders and medals.

Marina Veličković (Serbian: Марина Величковић, née Grgić or Gergina; born c. 1860), also known as Veličkovićka, was a Serbian nurse who was active in many wars of Serbia.

Marina lived in Pančevo. Marina participated as a volunteer soldier in the 1876–1878 war against the Ottoman Empire. She was sixteen years old, and wore short hair. For her participation, on the motion of general Đura Horvatović, she received the Silver Medal of Bravery. In the second part of the war, she served as a military hospital nurse, and medic, for which she received the War Commemorative Medal (ratna spomenica). She served in the Serbian-Bulgarian war of 1885 for which she received Medal for Military Virtue.

During the Annexation Crisis (1908), she began nurse education to improve her experience and be ready in case of war. With the mobilization for the First Balkan War, she joined the Serbian Army in Vranje, then worked in Kumanovo, and with the end of hostilities worked at the Belgrade Hospital. With the Second Balkan War, she worked in the Belgrade Hospital. She was still alive in 1921.

== See also ==
- Milunka Savić
- Sofija Jovanović
- Antonija Javornik
- Živana Terzić
- Flora Sandes

== Sources ==
- Kačavenda, Petar (1996). Dobrovoljci u oslobodilačkim ratovima Srba i Crnogoraca: zbornik radova sa naučnog skupa održanog u Kikindi 11. i 12. aprila 1996. Institut za savremenu istoriju. p. 58. ISBN 978-86-7403-069-1.
- Šijački, Dušan M. (1922). Балкански рат у слици и речи: 1912-1913 (2nd ed.). Штампарија Савића и Комп. p. 523.
- Вардар. Коло српскикх сестара. 1935. p. 107.
- Državni kalendar Kraljevine Srba, Hrvata i Slovenaca. Državna Štamparija Kraljevine Srba, Hrvata i Slovenaca. 1921.
- Српска народна радикална странка (23 July 1901). Застава. Vol. XXXVI. Novi Sad: Српска народна радикална странка.
