= Živana Terzić =

Serbian war heroine

- Newspaper piece on Živana Terzić, the "Amazonian from Drina", 1938
- Born: Živana Milošević; 1888; Varna
- Military career
- Allegiance: Kingdom of Serbia
- Service years: 1912–1918
- Nicknames: Amazonian from Drina (Amazonka sa Drine), Žika
- Conflicts: Balkan Wars, World War I

Živana Terzić (Serbian: Живана Терзић; born 1888), known as Žika and the Amazonian from Drina (Амазонка са Дрине), was a Serbian war heroine who fought in the Balkan Wars and World War I.

Živana (née Milošević) was born in 1888 in Varna in Pocerina, the daughter of influential local Živan Milošević. Živana cut her hair, concealing her gender, and joined the Serbian Chetnik Organization, calling herself "Žika", and participated in their guerrilla operations in Macedonia. She joined out of love, because her husband, Royal Guard officer Milan Terzić, had joined the Chetniks. She fought in the band of vojvoda Đorđe Ristić Skopljanče. As she was nimble, she was lowered by rope into walled enemy fortifications and opened the gates from inside. In the Balkan Wars, she served as a nurse in the field hospital in Ristovac. In World War I, she again volunteered as a soldier after the death of his brother at the heavy fighting in Gučevo. She joined the Iron Regiment of the Morava Division. She addressed the commander Gvozden Ristanović with "Colonel, I am a former Chetnik. I want to die on the battlefield, to avenge my fallen brother. I claim to be more combative than many soldiers". She fought under reserve lieutenant Dimitrije Barbulović of the 2nd Platoon, and participated in the Drina operations, and at Kurjačica she received the rank of corporal (kaplar). Next, she fought at Cer, Mačkov Kamen, Rudnik (in 1914), in Durrës (1915), and Bitola (1916). She led her own platoon at Bitola, where she was seriously wounded, and received the Miloš Obilić Medal for Bravery and the rank of sergeant. She recovered in France, and despite colonel Jordan Stajić deeming her unfit, she participated in the liberation of Serbia and Belgrade. Her merits were kept silent after the wars, until she was interviewed by Vreme in 1938.

== See also ==
- Milunka Savić
- Sofija Jovanović
- Mara Petrović
- Antonija Javornik
- Marina Veličković
- Lenka Rabasović
- Flora Sandes

== Sources ==
- Mladenović, Božica (2002). "Živana Terzić, ratnik sa Drine". Istorijski časopis. XLIX.
- Žikić, Milena; Milosavljević, Tanja (2025-07-16). "Six women warriors in Serbian Army history in 1914 and 1915". СИНЕЗА. 6 (2). University of Banja Luka: 1–15. doi:10.63356/sin.2025.012. ISSN 2712-1291.
- Време, бр. 5868, 22. мај 1938, Амазонка са Дрине повукла се у самоћу, 17
