= Mara Petrović =

Serbian war heroine

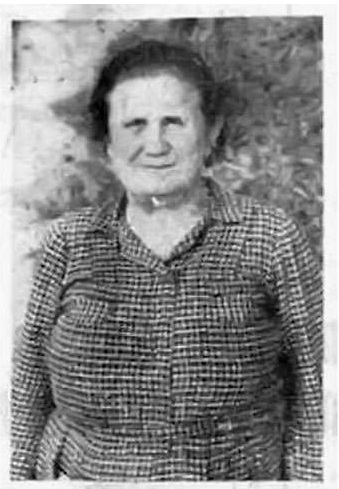
- Born: c. 1885
- Died: c. 1950
- Military career
- Allegiance: Kingdom of Serbia
- Service years: 1912–1918
- Conflicts: Balkan Wars, World War I

Mara Petrović (Serbian: Мара Петровић) was a Serbian war heroine who fought in the Balkan Wars and World War I.

After her father and brother joined the Serbian Chetnik Organization, she joined too, participating in operations in Macedonia. With the outbreak of the First Balkan War, she was part of the Detachment of vojvoda Voja Tankosić organized into the Drina Division. She participated at Nagoričane in October 1912, where her brother fell. Driven to avenge her brother, Mara participated in all wars between 1912 and 1918. She was wounded in the Second Balkan War. She participated in World War I, and at Kurjačica (with Živana Terzić) she distinguished herself, receiving the Order of Karađorđe's Star with Swords, after swimming and scouting enemy positions. At Gučevo, she received seven wounds and recovered in Niš, then joined the Morava Division, participated in the Great Retreat and Salonika Front. After successful reconnaissance of Bulgarian positions, she received an officer rank. She was wounded at Crna Reka and treated in Voden and Bizerte. Her leg was amputated at Salonika in 1917. She was decorated twelve times and by the end of the war held the rank of sub-lieutenant.

== See also ==
- Milunka Savić
- Sofija Jovanović
- Antonija Javornik
- Marina Veličković
- Živana Terzić
- Lenka Rabasović
- Flora Sandes

== Sources ==
- Žikić, Milena; Milosavljević, Tanja (2025-07-16). "Six women warriors in Serbian Army history in 1914 and 1915". СИНЕЗА. 6 (2). University of Banja Luka: 1–15. doi:10.63356/sin.2025.012. ISSN 2712-1291.
- Damjanović, Miloš (March 30, 2019), Заборављена хероина Великог рата [A Forgotten Heroine of the Great War], Politika (in Serbian)
- "Mara Petrović". Galerija Srbije.
