= Women's Battalion =

World War I Russian all-female combat units

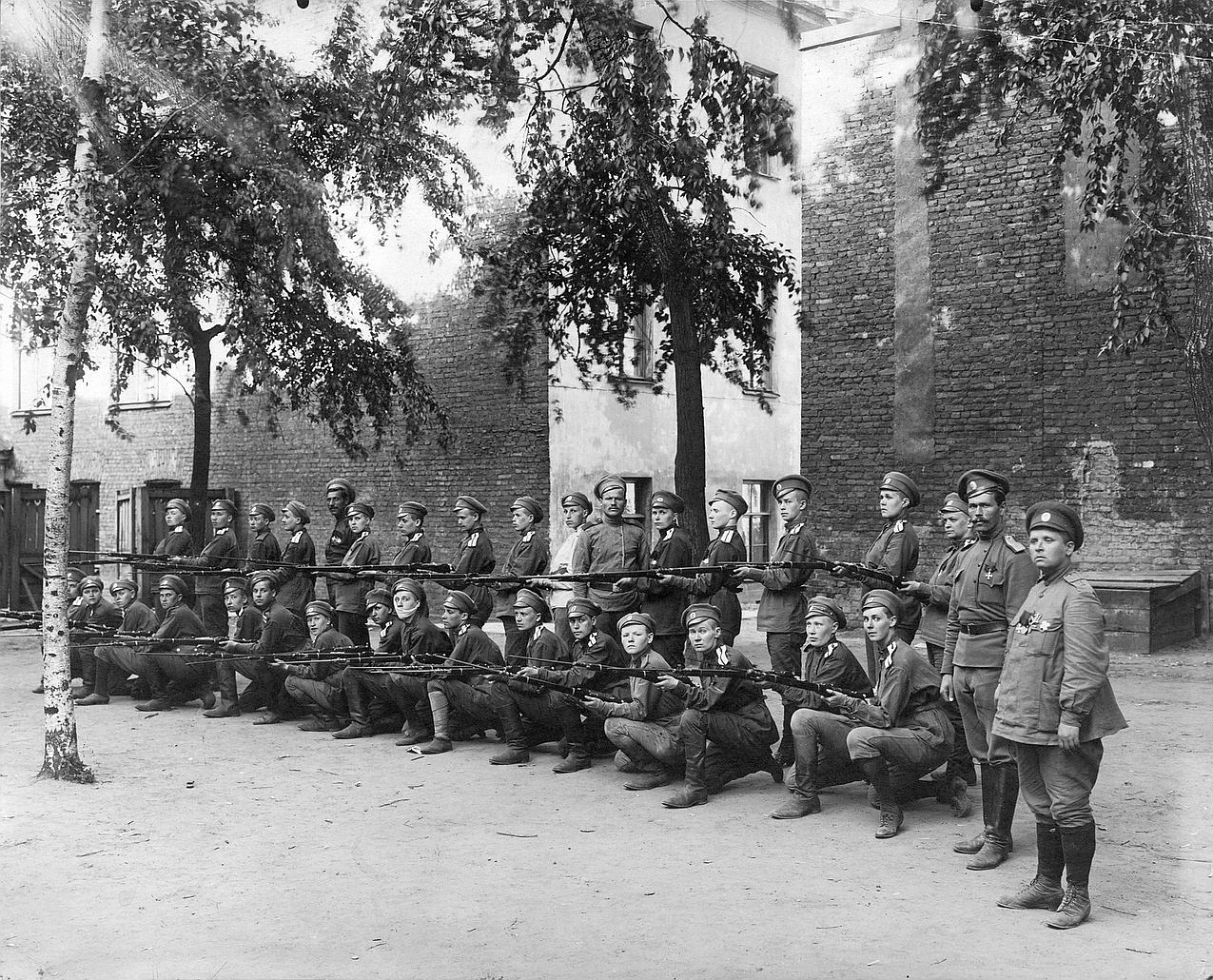
Members of the 1st Russian Women's Battalion of Death with their commander Maria Bochkareva (far right) in 1917.

Women's Battalions (Russian: Женские батальоны, romanized: Zhenskiye batal'ony) were all-female combat units formed after the February Revolution by the Russian Provisional Government, in a last-ditch effort to inspire the mass of war-weary soldiers to continue fighting in World War I.

In the spring of 1917, Kerensky, the Russian Ministry of War authorized the creation of sixteen separate all-female military formations. Four were designated as infantry battalions, eleven slated as communications detachments and a singular naval unit. Already some women had successfully petitioned to join regular military units, and with the planning of the Kerensky Offensive, a number began pressing the new Provisional Government to create special women's battalions. These women, along with a number of high-ranking members of the Russian government and military administration, believed that female soldiers would have significant propaganda value, their example revitalizing the weary and demoralized men of the Russian army. Simultaneously, they hoped the presence of women would shame hesitant male soldiers into resuming their combat duties.

American reporter Bessie Beatty estimated the total number of women serving in these gender-segregated units at 5,000 in the fall of 1917, but only the 1st Russian Women's Battalion of Death and the 1st Petrograd Battalion were ever deployed to the front.

== List of battalions ==
- 1st Russian Women's Battalion of Death
- 1st Petrograd Women's Battalion
- 2nd Moscow Women's Battalion of Death
- 3rd Kuban Women's Shock Battalion
- 1st Women's Naval Detachment
- Minsk Women's Separate Guard Militia
- Saratov Women's Shock Battalion
- Kiev Women's Military Detachment

Among the rush and chaos several unsanctioned units were also formed, including the Women's Kuran of Death, Mariupol Women's Battalion of Death, Baku Women's Battalion of Death, Viatka Women's Battalion, 1st Detachment of Volunteer Women's Scouts, Skimbirsk Women's Legion of Death, Ekaterinburg Women's Battalion of Death, Ukrainian Women's Battalion and an unnamed unit organized by the Tashkent Women's Union

== Fate and aftermath ==
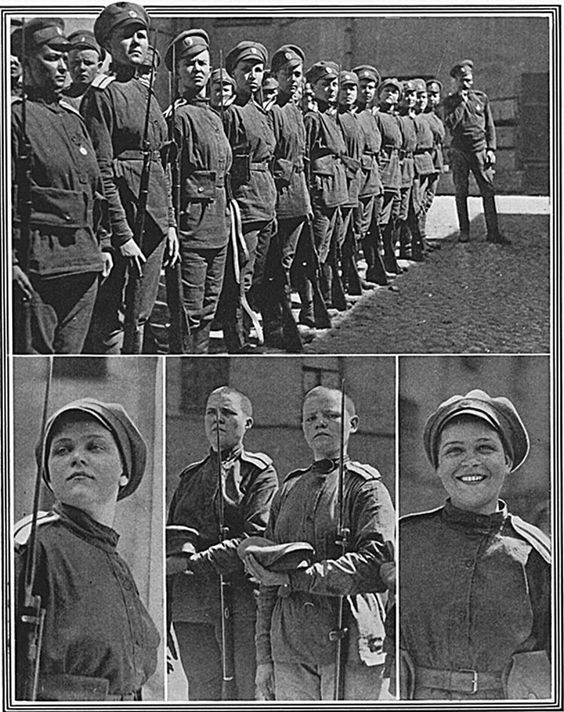
Publicity photo of Bochkareva's battalion after their combat in Galicia, 1917

With no definite consensus among the military administration as to the potential value of female soldiers, coupled with the severe shortages from which the nation was then suffering, the army made only a half-hearted commitment to the project. Thus, the women's units received inadequate attention and assistance from the military administration. Many among the Russian military authorities were waiting to see how the women fared in battle and whether they would have a positive effect on male soldiers.

After the 1st Russian Women's Battalion of Death failed to have the intended effect of revitalizing the war-weary elements of the Russian army, the military authorities began to question the value of the women's units as a whole. In particular, the government found it difficult to justify the allocation of badly needed resources to such an unreliable project. By August 1917, there was a growing inclination in the military establishment to discontinue the organization of women for combat purposes. Facing withdrawal of official support, the 2nd Moscow Women's Battalion of Death began to disintegrate in September. Just prior to disbanding however, about 500 volunteers were sent to the front at their own request without the knowledge or permission of the military authorities.

Faced with the decision of what to do with their women's units, the military at first decided to shift them into auxiliary roles away from the front, such as guarding railroads, but this faced opposition from men in those positions who would in turn be sent to the front. Instead, on 30 November 1917, the new Bolshevik government ordered the official dissolution of any remaining women's military formations. Regardless however, members of the 1st Petrograd and 3rd Kuban women's battalions lingered in their camps until early 1918. Some women who had served in these units went on to fight on both sides of the Russian Civil War.

== Sources ==
- De Groot, Gerard J.; Peniston-Bird C. M. (2000). A Soldier and a Woman: Sexual Integration in the Military (Women and Men in History). Pearson Education. ISBN 0582414393.
- Botchkareva, Maria; Levine, Isaac Don (1919). Yashka: My Life as a Peasant, Exile and Soldier. London: Constable Publication.
- Stites, Richard (1978). The Women's Liberation Movement in Russia: Feminism, Nihilism, and Bolshevism 1860–1930. Princeton University Press. ISBN 0691052549.
- Stockdale, Melissa K. (February 2004). "'My Death for the Motherland is Happiness': Women, Patriotism, and Soldiering in Russia's Great War, 1914–1917". American Historical Review. 109 (1): 78–116. doi:10.1086/530152. JSTOR 10.1086/530152.
- Stoff, Laurie (2006). They Fought for the Motherland: Russia's Women Soldiers in World War I and the Revolution. Lawrence: University Press of Kansas. ISBN 978-0-7006-1485-1.
