= Maria Bochkareva =

Russian female soldier and counter revolutionary

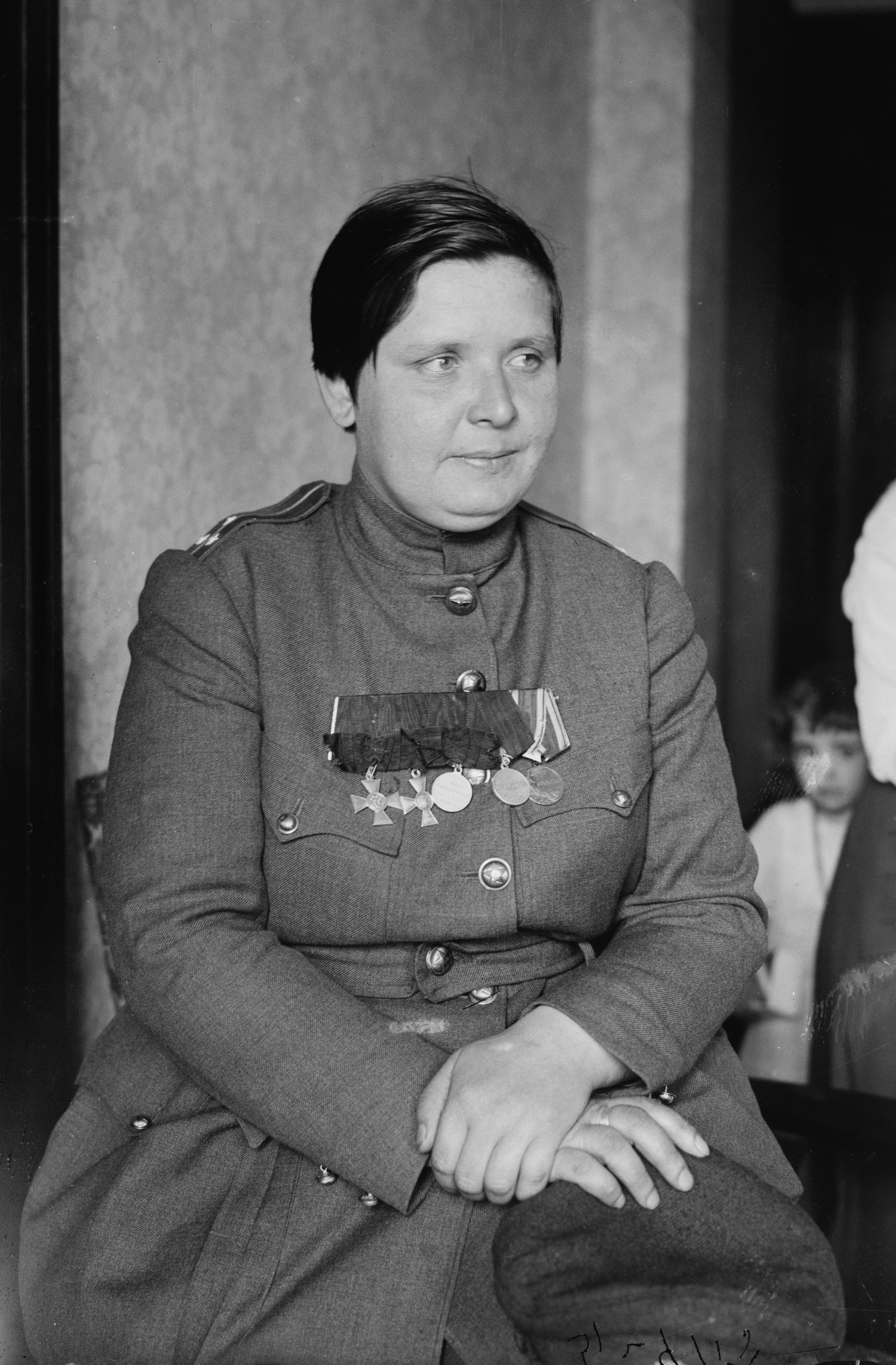
- Born: July 1889; Nikolskoye, Kirillovsky Uyezd, Russian Empire
- Died: 16 May 1920 (aged 30); Krasnoyarsk, Russian SFSR
- Military career
- Allegiance: Russian Empire (to 1917); Russian Republic
- Units: 25th Tomsk Reserve Battalion
- Commands: Women's Battalion
- Conflicts: World War I; Kerensky Offensive

María Leontievna Bochkareva (July 1889 – 16 May 1920; Russian: Мари́я Лео́нтьевна Бочкарёва, romanized: Maria Leontievna Bochkareva, née Frolkova (Фролко́ва), nicknamed Yashka) was a Russian soldier who fought in World War I and formed the Women's Battalion. She was the first Russian woman to command a military unit.

== Early life ==
Maria Frolkova was born to a peasant family in the village of Nikolskoye in July 1889. Her father was a sergeant in the imperial army who fought in the Russo-Turkish War. She left home at sixteen to marry Afanasy Bochkarev. They moved to Tomsk, Siberia, where they worked as labourers. Her husband abused her, causing her to leave him. She found a job as a servant to employers who coerced her into working in their brothel. They moved her to Sretensk where Maria began a relationship with a local Jewish man named Yakov (or Yankel) Buk. She and Buk opened a butcher shop, but in May 1912 Buk was arrested for larceny and sent to Yakutsk. Bochkareva followed him into exile, primarily on foot, where the couple established another butcher shop. Buk was caught stealing again and sent to Amga in 1913. Once again Bochkareva followed him. Buk began drinking heavily and became abusive.

== Military career ==
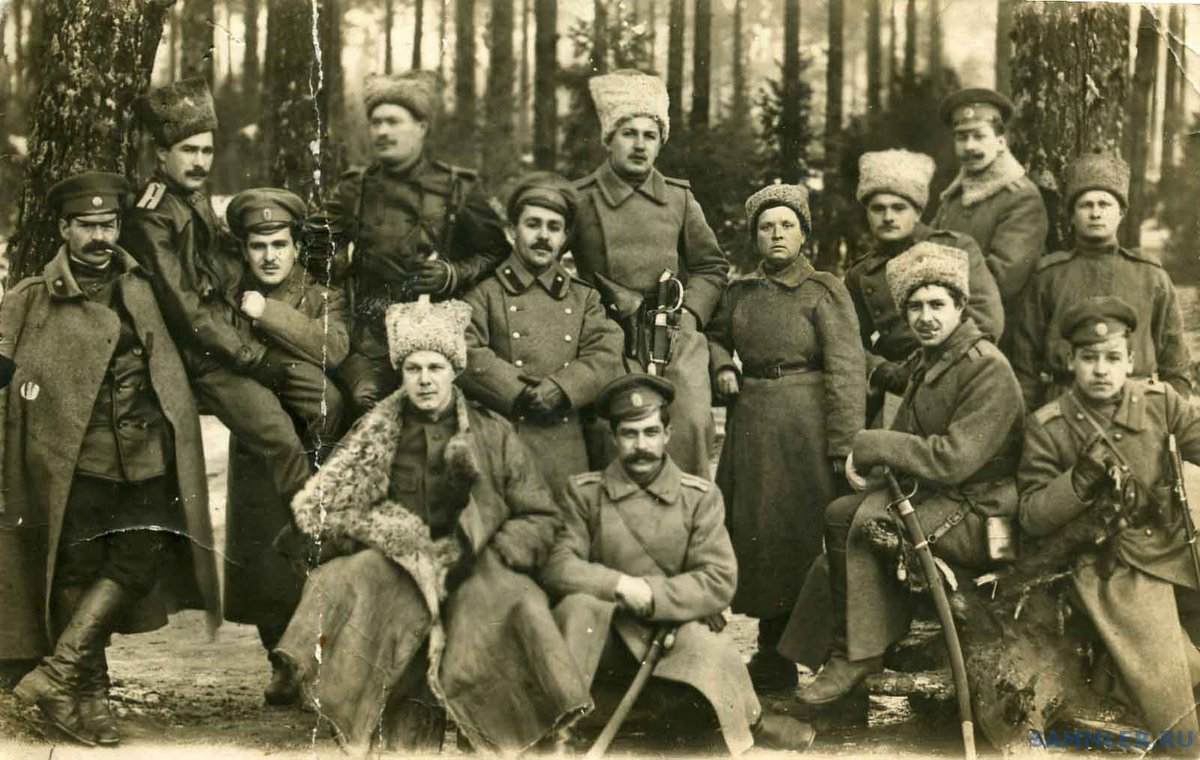
Maria Bochkareva in 1915

At the outbreak of World War I in 1914, Bochkareva left Buk and returned to Tomsk. In November, she was rejected by the 25th Tomsk Reserve Battalion of the Imperial Russian Army. The commander suggested that she try joining the Red Cross instead. When she insisted that she wanted to fight with the men, the commander helped her compose a telegram to Tsar Nicholas II requesting his personal permission. When she obtained his approval, she underwent three months' training and was sent to front-line duty with the 5th Corps, 28th Regiment of the Second Army, stationed at Polotsk. She was decorated for rescuing fifty wounded soldiers from the field.

After she was wounded in the arm and leg, Bochkareva worked as a medical sister until she returned to the front as a corporal in charge of eleven men.

She suffered another injury that left her paralyzed for four months. After she recovered, she returned to the front as a senior non-commissioned officer delivering supplies to a platoon of seventy men. Men of the regiment treated her with ridicule or sexually harassed her until she proved her courage in battle. Eventually, she became exhausted from her physical injuries and lost interest in her military post. She was discharged in the spring of 1917.

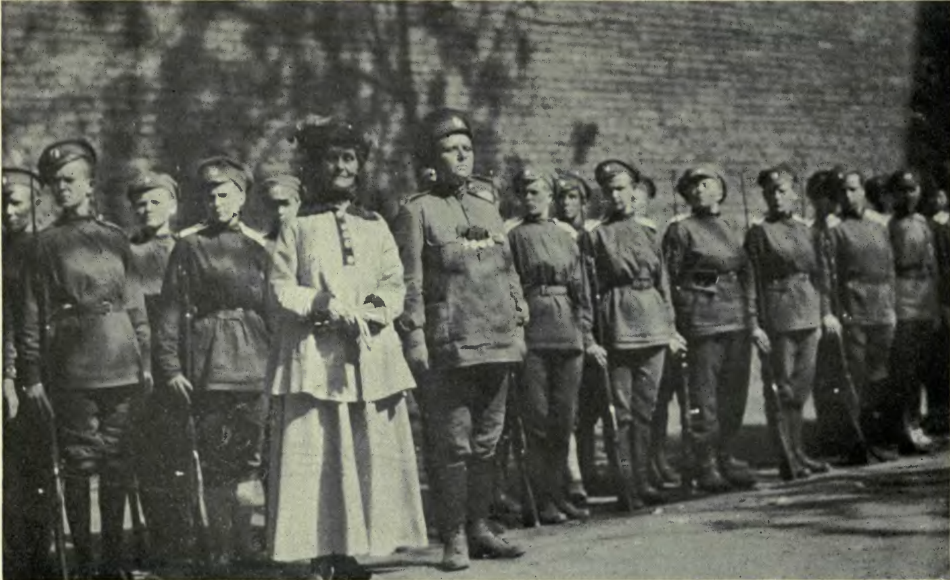
Bochkareva and Emily Pankhurst with women of the Women's Battalion of Death, 1917

After the abdication of the Tsar in early 1917 due to the February Revolution, she proposed to Mikhail Rodzianko the creation of an all-female combat unit that she claimed would fix the Army's morale problem. She believed that it would shame the men into again supporting the war effort. Once she agreed to lead the unit, her proposal was approved by Army Commander-in-Chief Brusilov, and she approached Minister of War Alexander Kerensky. Although female recruitment went against army regulations, the all-female battalion was granted special dispensation. This was the first women's battalion to be organised in Russia. Bochkareva's 1st Russian Women's Battalion of Death initially attracted around 2,000 women volunteers, but the commander's strict discipline drove all but around 300 out of the unit.

The rushed training of the battalion was led by twenty-five male instructors from the Volunskii Regiment of the Petrograd Military District. The battalion was blessed at Saint Isaac's Cathedral on June 25, 1917. After a month of training, Bochkareva and her unit became attached to the First Siberian Corps and was sent to the Russian western front to participate in the Kerensky Offensive, where Bochkareva was promoted to the rank of lieutenant. The unit was involved in one major battle—near the town of Smarhon. The women of the unit performed well in combat, but the vast majority of male soldiers, already demoralised, had little inclination to fight. Bochkareva herself was wounded in the battle and sent back to Petrograd to recuperate.

Bochkareva was only marginally involved in the creation of other women's combat units formed in Russia during the spring and summer of 1917. Her unit was at the front at the time of the October Revolution and did not participate in the defence of the Winter Palace—another women's unit did, the 1st Petrograd Women's Battalion. Bochkareva's unit disbanded after facing increasing hostility from the remaining male troops at the front. Bochkareva returned to Petrograd where she was briefly detained by the Bolsheviks. She secured permission to rejoin her family in Tomsk but returned to Petrograd again in early 1918. She claims to have then received a telegram asking her to take a message to General Lavr Kornilov, who was commanding a White Army in the Caucasus. After leaving Kornilov's headquarters, she was again detained by the Bolsheviks and, after they learned of her connection with the Whites, was scheduled to be executed. She was rescued, however, by a soldier who had served with her in the Imperial Army in 1915 and who convinced the Bolsheviks to stay her execution. She was granted an external passport and allowed to leave the country. Bochkareva then made her way to Vladivostok, where she left for the United States on the U.S. Army Transport Sheridan on 18 April 1918.

== United States and Britain ==
Sponsored by socialite Florence Harriman, Bochkareva arrived in San Francisco and made her way to New York City and Washington, D.C. She was granted a meeting with President Woodrow Wilson on July 10, 1918, during which she begged the president to intervene in Russia. Wilson was apparently so moved by her emotional appeal that he responded with tears in his eyes and promised to do what he could.

While in New York, Bochkareva dictated her memoirs, Yashka: My Life As Peasant, Exile, and Soldier, to a Russian emigre journalist named Isaac Don Levine. After leaving the United States, she traveled to Great Britain where she was granted an audience with King George V. The British War Office gave her 500 rubles of funding to return to Russia.

== Return to Russia and execution ==
Bochkareva arrived in Arkhangelsk in August 1918 and attempted to organise another unit, but failed.

In April 1919, she returned to Tomsk and attempted to form a women's medical detachment under White Army Admiral Aleksandr Kolchak, but before she could complete this task she was recaptured by the Bolsheviks. She was sent to Krasnoyarsk where she was interrogated for four months. Ultimately, she was sentenced to death and executed as an "enemy of the working class". She was shot by the Cheka on May 16, 1920.

== Legacy ==
Maria Bochkareva is one of the heroines of the Russian film Battalion directed by Dmitriy Meskhiev and released to cinemas in February 2015.

In 2018 the New York Times published a belated obituary for her.

== See also ==
- Flora Sandes – First World War soldier and nurse (1876–1956)
- Milunka Savić – Serbian war heroine
- Ecaterina Teodoroiu – World War I soldier and nurse
- Leslie Joy Whitehead – Canadian female soldier
- Women in the military – Women participating in military activities

== Bibliography ==
- Maria Botchkareva. Yashka: My Life as Peasant, Exile, and Soldier. As told to Isaac Don Levine (New York: Frederick A. Stokes, 1919. online (Archive.org))
