= Ecaterina Teodoroiu =

World War I soldier and nurse

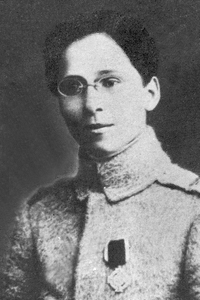
- Second Lieutenant Ecaterina Teodoroiu
- Born: Cătălina Toderoiu; January 14, 1894; Vădeni, Kingdom of Romania
- Died: September 3, 1917 (aged 23); Muncelu, Kingdom of Romania
- Burial place: Târgu Jiu; 45.041141°N 23.271861°E
- Military career
- Allegiance: Kingdom of Romania
- Branch: Royal Romanian Army
- Service years: 1916–1917
- Rank: Sublocotenent
- Conflicts: World War I; Romanian Campaign †
- Awards: Military Virtue Medal, 1st Class and 2nd Class

Ecaterina Teodoroiu (Romanian pronunciation: [ekateˈrina te.odoˈroju]; formal rendition of Cătălina Toderoiu; 14 January 1894 – 3 September 1917) was a Romanian woman who fought on the front and died in World War I, and is regarded as a heroine of Romania.

A Romanian Scouts member, she had initially worked as a nurse but she subsequently decided to become a front-line soldier, being deeply impressed by the patriotism of the wounded and the death of her brother Nicolae, a sergeant in the Romanian Army. It was an unusual decision for a woman of that era, so she was sent to the front rather reluctantly. However, with the support of the Romanian royal family, she was able to serve in the military and eventually came to be seen as a symbol.

== Early life ==
Teodoroiu was born in the village of Vădeni (now part of Târgu Jiu), in the historical region of Oltenia, in the family of Elena and Vasile Toderoiu, both farmers. Ecaterina had five brothers (Nicolae, Eftimie, Andrei, Ion, Vasile) and two sisters (Elisabeta and Sabina). After studying for 4 years in Vădeni and Târgu Jiu at the Romanian-German Primary School, she went on to graduate from the Girls' School in Bucharest. There she joined the first female Romanian Scout troop. Returning home, she became active in another scout troop. Before she could start her preparation for a teaching certificate, the Kingdom of Romania entered World War I in August 1916, on the side of the Allies.

== Military career ==
Working as a nurse, on 27 October [O.S. 14 October] 1916 Teodoroiu joined the civilians and the reserve soldiers fighting to repulse the attack of a Bavarian company of the 9th German Army at the bridge over the Jiu River, in front of Târgu-Jiu. Impressed by her bravery, the Royal Family invited her to Bucharest on 6 November [O.S. 23 October].

On 13 November [O.S. 30 October], she went to the frontline to see her brother Nicolae, a sergeant in the 18 Infantry Regiment (Gorj). Shortly afterwards, on 14 November [O.S. 1 November], her brother was killed by an artillery shell during fighting near Porceni (today Gornăcel, Schela, Gorj).

Wishing to avenge her brother's death, Teodoroiu asked Colonel Obogeanu to allow her to join the 18th Infantry Regiment as a volunteer. She would soon prove her military skills by using a ruse in order to keep her company, surrounded by the enemy, from being taken prisoner: after announcing in German the decision of the regiment to surrender, Teodoroiu started shooting, killing several Germans and allowing most of the company to escape. Should this story be accurate, it would have been a war crime under Regulations: Art. 23(f) of the Convention (IV) respecting the Laws and Customs of War on Land and its annex: Regulations concerning the Laws and Customs of War on Land. The Hague, 18 October 1907, which had been ratified by Romania in 1909.

She was later captured during fighting on the Rășina-Tunși-Peșteana heights on the night of 16/17 November [O.S. 3/4 November] 1916, but managed to escape with light wounds by killing the German soldier who was guarding her with a gun she had concealed in her uniform. The Germans shot the escaping Romanians through the darkness and wounded Teodoroiu in her right leg. However, she brushed this aside and returned to the company that same evening. She killed at least two Germans during her escape.

On 19 November [O.S. 6 November], Teodoroiu was involved in skirmishes close to Bărbătești and Țânțăreni. Later that day, the Germans reached the town of Filiași. Fighting near Filiași on that same day, she was wounded in both legs by a mortar shell, evacuated to Craiova, then to Bucharest and later hospitalized at the King Ferdinand Military Hospital in Iași. She recovered from her wounds within months, and was discharged from hospital on 5 February [O.S. 23 January] 1917.

While in hospital, she met Second Lieutenant Gheorghe Mănoiu, the brother of a former school colleague. Upon her release, she asked to join his 43/59 Infantry Regiment as a voluntary nurse.

For her bravery, she was awarded the "Scout Virtue" Medal and the Military Virtue Medal, 2nd Class, on 10 March 1917. On 17 March 1917 she was awarded the Military Virtue Medal, 1st Class, made honorary Second Lieutenant (Sublocotenent) by King Ferdinand and given the command of a 25-man platoon in the 7th Company (43/59 Infantry Regiment, 11th Division), commanded by Second Lieutenant Gheorghe Mănoiu. Thus, she became the first female Romanian Army officer.

Starting with 8 May [O.S. 25 April] 1917, the regiment was quartered in Codăești, Vaslui County. On 17 August [O.S. 4 August], the 43/59 Regiment, part of the reserve of the 1st Army led by General Eremia Grigorescu, prepared to join the upcoming offensive. On 18 August [O.S. 5 August] the regiment left Vaslui for Tecuci, crossed the Siret River and camped in the Malta Seacă forest, close to the frontline.

On 30 August [O.S. 17 August], the commander of the 11th Division, General Ernest Broșteanu, kindly asked her to stay at the mobile hospital behind the front, but Second Lieutenant Teodoroiu strongly refused him, requesting to be allowed to join her platoon in the upcoming battle.

On 2 September [O.S. 20 August], the 43/59 Regiment dug in on the Secului Hill, in the Muncelu-Varnița area.

On 3 September [O.S. 21 August] 1917, the Romanian lines were attacked in force by the German 40th Reserve Regiment of the 115th Infantry Division. While leading her platoon in a counterattack, she was hit by machine gun fire in the chest (according to some accounts), or in the head (according to other accounts). According to the General Order No. 1 issued the next day by Colonel Constantin Pomponiu, the commanding officer of the 43/59 Regiment, her last words before getting hit by machine gun fire and dying shortly afterwards were: "Forward, men, don't give up, I'm still with you!"

== Legacy ==
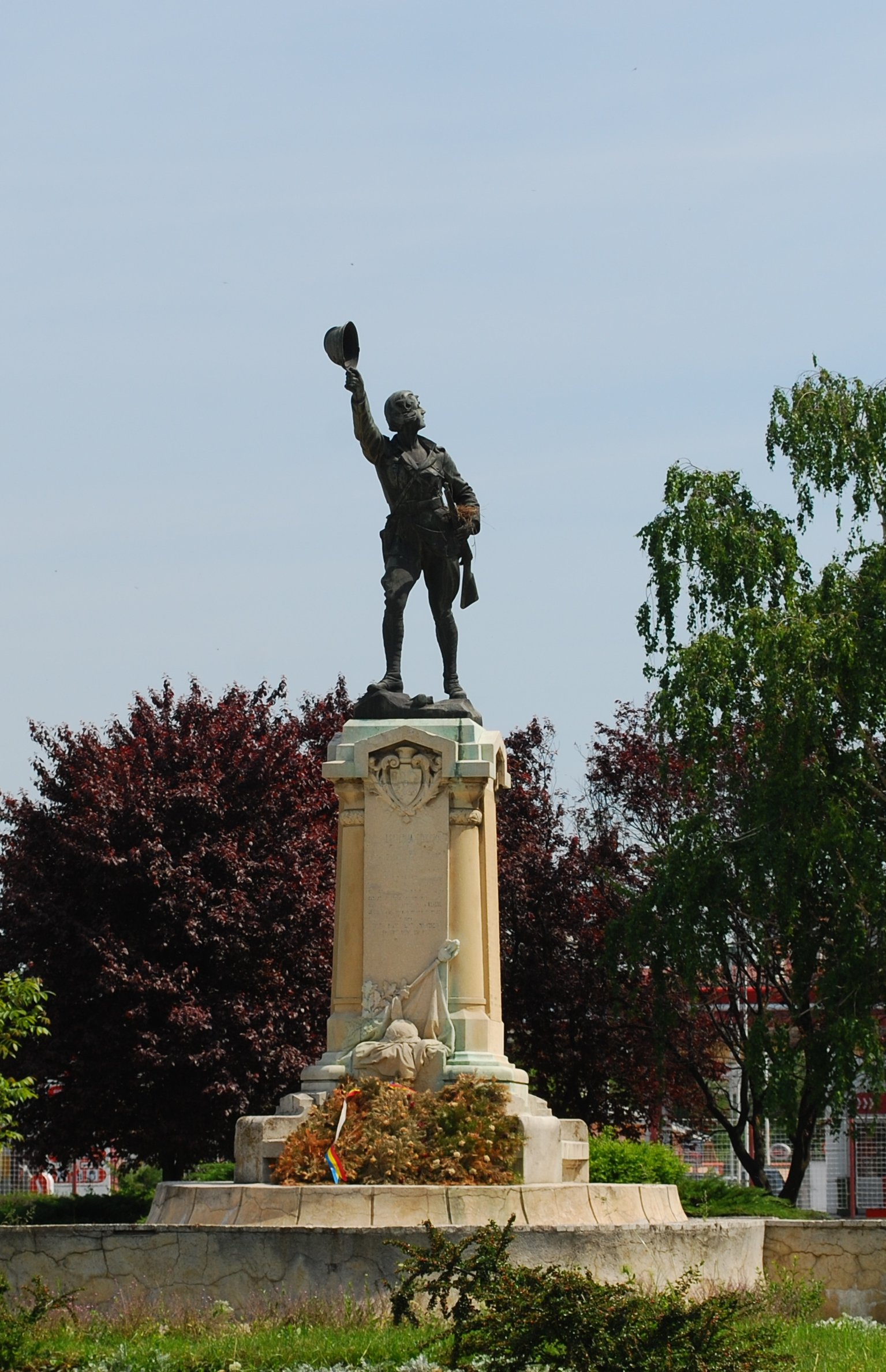
Monument in Slatina

After the war, Ecaterina Teodoroiu was elevated to the status of a heroine of the Romanian people. Henri Berthelot even named her the "Joan of Arc of Romania" for her outstanding bravery, patriotism and self-sacrifice.

Initially buried close to the front, in Fitionești, her remains were interred in June 1921 in a crypt in the city center of Târgu Jiu. Her grave is honored by a monument erected in 1936 by Milița Petrașcu.

In 1921, the Regiment 43/59 Infantry became the honorary name "Ecaterina Teodoroiu". In 1937, by Royal Decree, the Girls' High School in Târgu-Jiu was given her name (currently the Ecaterina Teodoroiu National College). In 1938, her native home became a memorial house.

Several monuments were erected in her honor:

- "Ecaterina Teodoroiu" Monument in Slatina, inaugurated in 1925 in the presence of Queen Marie
- "Ecaterina Teodoroiu" Monument in Brăila (1928)
- "Ecaterina Teodoroiu" Mausoleum in Târgu-Jiu (1936)
- "Heroes' Monument" in Azuga (1937)
- "Monument of Second Lieutenant Ecaterina Teodoroiu" in Muncelu (1972)
- "Ecaterina Teodoroiu" Statue in Târgu-Jiu (1979)

The following films were made about her:

- "Ecaterina Teodoroiu" (1921)
- "Ecaterina Teodoroiu" (1930)
- "Ecaterina Teodoroiu" (1978), directed by Dinu Cocea and starring Stela Furcovici in Teodoroiu's role.

Her wartime record was also a subject of Sergiu Nicolaescu's 1999 film Triunghiul morții, starring Ilinca Goia as Ecaterina Teodoroiu.

Kathryn J. Atwood dedicated a chapter to Ecaterina Teodoriu in her work Women Heroes of World War I: 16 Remarkable Resisters, Soldiers, Spies, and Medics. Artist Sierra Barnes created a comic, Ecaterina Teodoroiu, in 2021 for the non-profit Great War Group, which promotes education and commemoration surrounding the First World War.

On 31 July 2019, the National Bank of Romania announced that in 2020 it would issue the 20 lei banknote, which would feature Ecaterina Teodoroiu. The issue of the 20 lei banknote was postponed to the autumn of 2021 due to the COVID-19 pandemic. In November 2021 the National Bank of Romania announced that the 20 lei banknote bearing Ecaterina Teodoroiu's portrait would be issued on 1 December 2021. It was the first Romanian banknote with legal tender to feature a female personality.

== Gallery ==
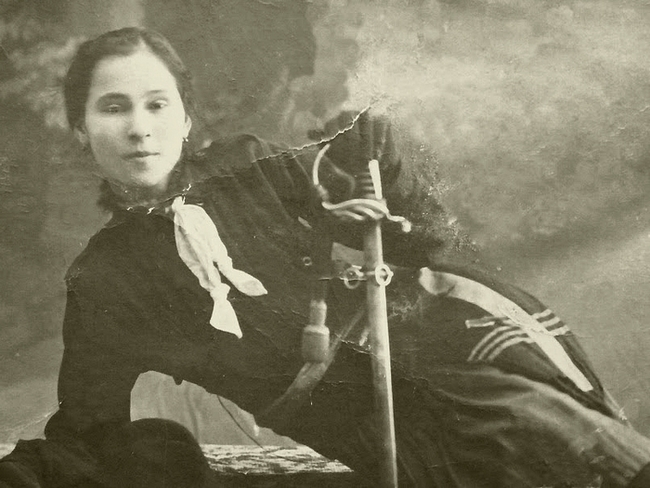
Ecaterina Teodoroiu - portrait

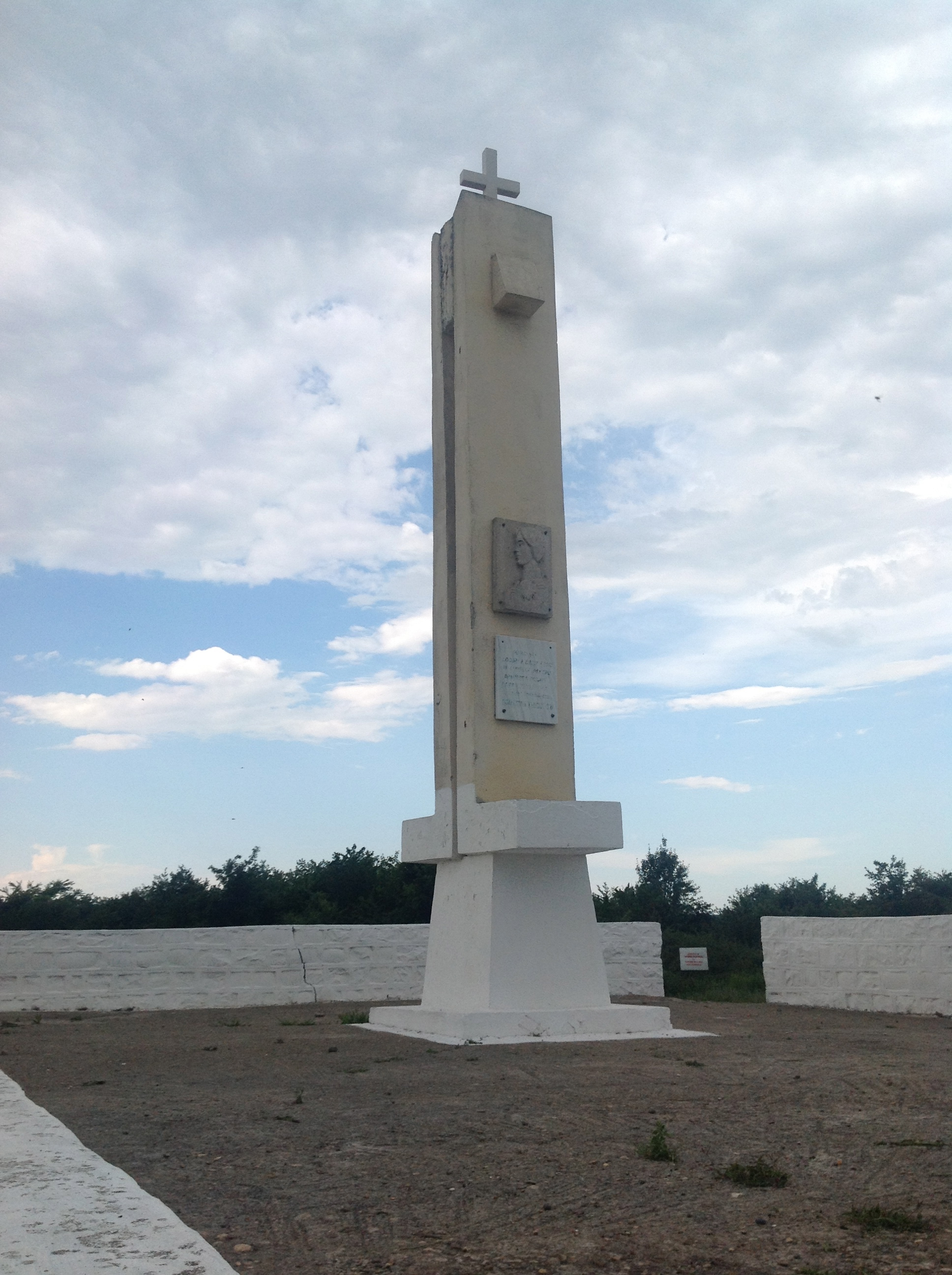
Panciu memorial at the site of her death

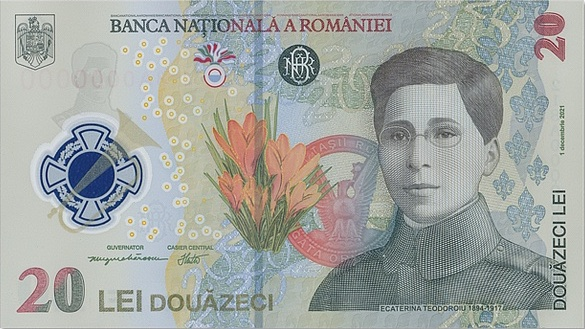
The 20 lei banknote featuring Ecaterina Teodoroiu's portrait

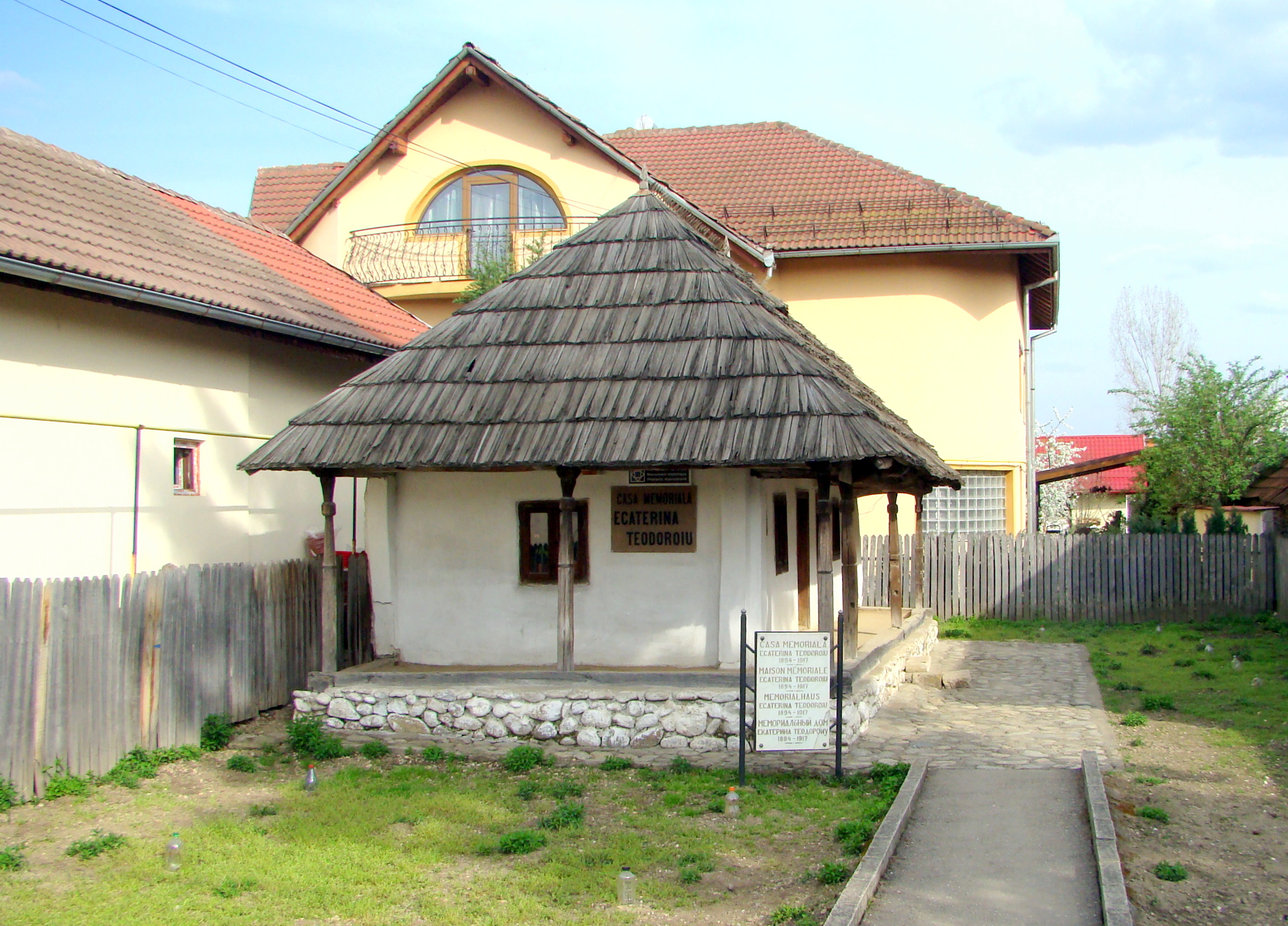
Casa memoriala Ecaterina Teodoroiu

== See also ==
- Flora Sandes – First World War soldier and nurse (1876–1956)
- Milunka Savić – Serbian war heroine
- Maria Bochkareva – Russian female soldier and counter revolutionary
- Leslie Joy Whitehead – Canadian female soldier
- Women in the military – Women participating in military activities
