= Bioska =

Bioska Биоска
- village
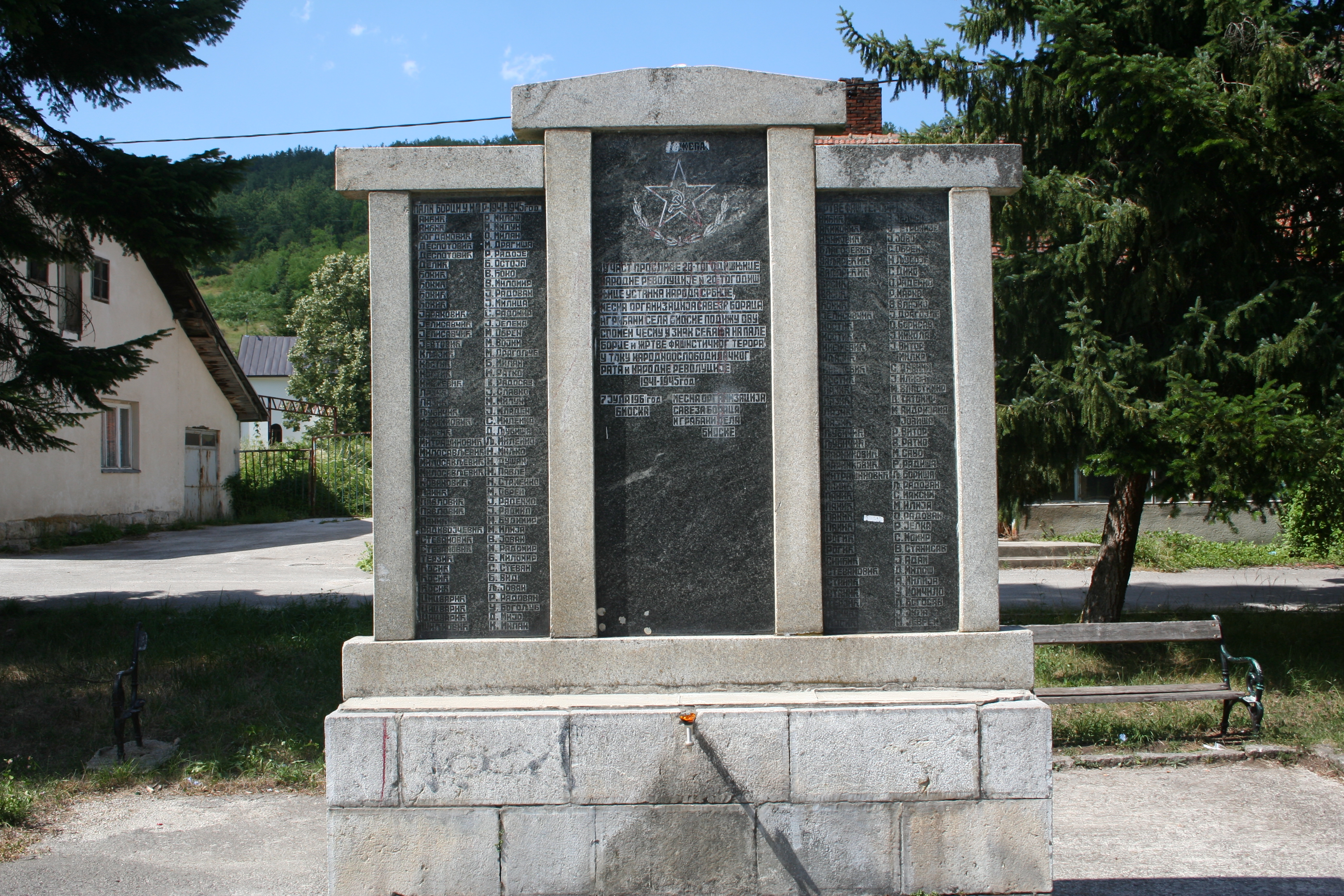
- Bioska village center
- Interactive map of Bioska
- Coordinates (mountain): 43.872222°N 19.66°E
- Country: Serbia
- Statistical region: Šumadija and Western Serbia
- District: Zlatibor District
- Elevation: 749 m (2,457 ft)

Population (2022)
  - Total: 262
- Time zone: +1
- Postal code: 31241
- Area code: 031

Bioska (Serbian Cyrillic: Биоска) is a village located in the Užice municipality of Serbia on the mountainous banks of Đetinja river and Lake Vrutci, between Zlatibor and Tara mountains, and close to Uzice-Ponikve airport and Kremna village, as well as Mokra Gora-Drvengrad, a.k.a. Küstendorf or Mećavnik (Мећавник). According to the 2022 census, the village has a population of 262. The Monastery of Rujno was situated nearby.

== Notable people ==
- Lenka Rabasović, heroine who fought as an irregular during World War I
