= Milița Petrașcu =

Milița Petrașcu, also known as Militza Pătrascu (31 December 1892– 25 January 1976), was a Romanian portrait artist and sculptor, part of the Romanian "avant-garde movement" during the interwar period which evolved around the "Contimporanul" magazine. Petrașcu is widely considered as the most talented Romanian woman sculptor of the 20th century.

== Biography ==
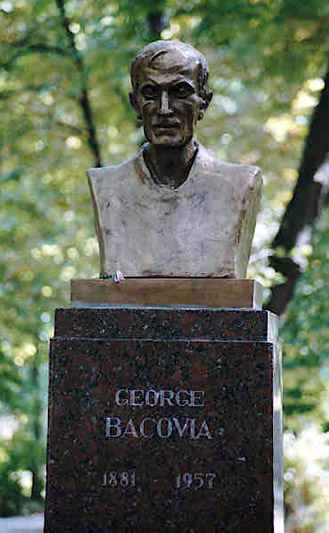
Petrașcu's bust of George Bacovia in the Alley of Classics, Chișinău

Petrașcu was born on 31 December 1892 in Chișinău under the name Melania Nicolaevici. She spent her childhood in Nisporeni where she first started sculpting in clay. After attending school in Chișinău, she enrolled as a student at the Moscow State Academy of Industrial and Applied Arts, where she studied sculpture under professors Konenkov and Dzyubanov (1907–1908). In 1909, Petrașcu studied philosophy at the Bestuzhev Institute (otherwise known as the Bestuzhev Courses) after which she travelled to Munich and enrolled at the Munich Academy of Fine Arts in 1910. At the Munich Academy, she worked under the direction of leading Avantgarde artists such as Wassily Kandinsky and Alexej von Jawlensky and came into contact with the creative team of the "Jugend" magazine. After her stay in Munich, Petrașcu spent several years in Paris working in the studios of Henri Matisse and Antoine Bourdelle (1910–1914). In 1919, she exhibited a bust at the Salon des Indépendants and met Constantin Brâncuși who was to become her mentor and guide in the world of modern sculpture. Brâncuși's influence can be seen throughout Petrașcu's works. At an exhibit of her works at a Paris gallery in 1927, Brâncuși told her, "You have worked enormously and at least three of your works are exceptional"; it is said he also exclaimed, "You are stronger than Rodin!"

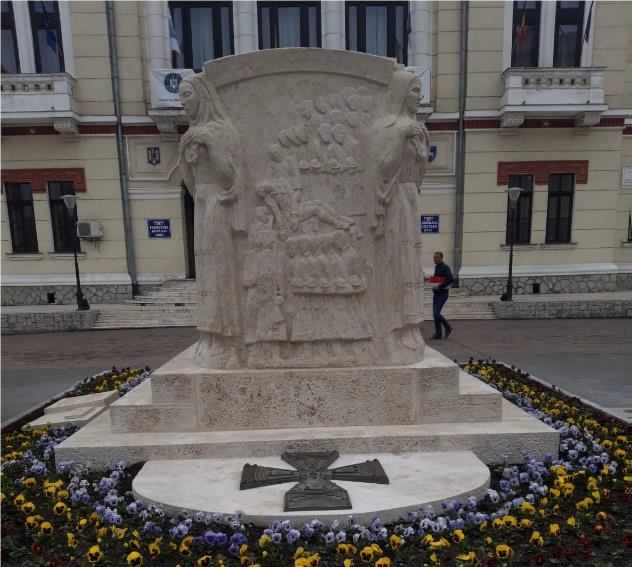
Petrașcu's mausoleum of Ecaterina Teodoroiu in Târgu Jiu

In 1925, she married Emil Petrașcu and settled in Bucharest. There, she joined the avantgarde movement around the "Contimporanul", "Grupul nostru" and "Criterion" magazines. In 1936 she designed the Ecaterina Teodoroiu Mausoleum, located in Târgu Jiu's Prefecture Square. She worked it in travertine brought from Italy and in the form of a sarcophagus with bas-reliefs illustrating scenes from Ecaterina Teodoroiu's life, as a child, as a scout, in war, and in her death.

Petrașcu died in 1976 in Bucharest and was buried in the city's Bellu Cemetery.
