= Koprivnica, Novi Pazar =

Koprivnica Копривница
- Village (Selo)
- Location within Serbia
- Coordinates: 43°25′43″N 20°43′07″E
- Country: Serbia
- Municipality: Novi Pazar
- Time zone: UTC+1 (CET)
  - Summer (DST): UTC+2 (CEST)

Koprivnica is a village situated in Novi Pazar municipality in Serbia. There are 12 people in the village, all ethnic Serbs. Milunka Savić (1889–1973), the most-decorated female combatant in the entire history of warfare, was born in the village.
