= Sofija Jovanović =

Serbian war heroine of the Balkan Wars and World War I

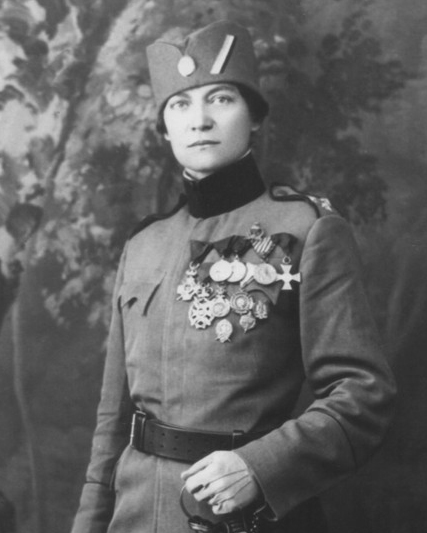
- Jovanović c. in post-war years
- Born: 26 January 1892
- Died: 1979 (aged 86–87)
- Military career
- Allegiance: Kingdom of Serbia
- Service years: 1912–1918
- Conflicts: Balkan Wars, World War I

Sofija Jovanović (Serbian Cyrillic: Софија Јовановић; 1895–1979) was a Serbian war heroine who fought in the Balkan Wars and the First World War.

== Early life ==
Sofija was born on 26 January 1892 in Belgrade, the youngest of eight daughters of Antonije and Hristina. Her father was a known butcher in Belgrade. Her father wished to have male offspring, which he never had, and his last words were that his greatest sorrow was to not have a son that could defend the fatherland. These last words were embedded into the mind of young Sofija, and became her moral duty in the coming wars. While in secondary school, she married and had a son with Simo Marinković. She lost her husband and son in typhus. The loss of her family members put her in a life crisis, shaped her emotional and psychological profile, but also served as the powerful motivation for participating in the wars. Her contemporaries said she was not only driven by patriotism and vow to her father, but also a kind of existential yearning to reunite with her deceased family. Furthermore, her generation perceived the wars as a collective duty.

== Military career ==
=== Balkan Wars ===
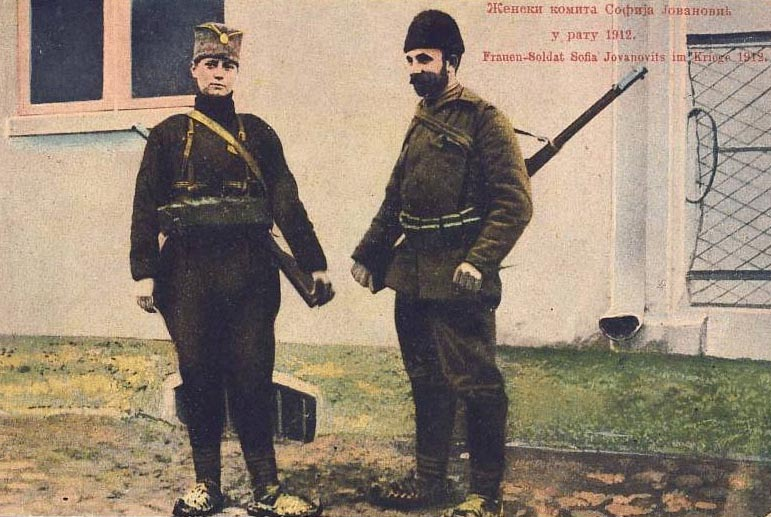
Sofija with a fellow Chetnik in the First Balkan War, 1912.

With the coming of the First Balkan War, she approached the nationalist Narodna Odbrana organization and was accepted into military training for the volunteer detachments, in Prokuplje and Vranjska Banja, under the well-known Chetnik Vojislav Tankosić. She cut her hair and wore uniform.

The volunteer detachments were sent on 25 September 1912 to Kuršumlija, where Sofija had her first armed engagements at the Crna čuka peak near Kuršumlijska Banja and at Velja glava peak near Vranje. In the First Balkan War, she fought in the Chetnik detachments which were guerrilla units directed to sabotage and undermine Ottoman holding in what is today North Macedonia.

Her unit participated in the important victory at the Battle of Kumanovo (23–24 October 1912) and Liberation of Skopje (1912). The Swiss doctor Adolf Vischer (1884–1974) who worked in the Serbian Red Cross met her at the time, and described her as:

Her face, delicate hands which constantly toyed with her rifle, her entire appearance left no doubt as to her sex. She wore Serbian folk attire made of thick, dark, coarse wool, with military-style opanci [peasant shoes] on her feet, while the standard military cap covered her short-cutted hair. Prideful, she showed us two bombs she carried in her belt.

During the first war she contracted pneumonia and was healed in Belgrade. Several archival documents identify her with her full name as a female guerrilla that recuperated at the 4th Reserve Hospital of the Circle of Serbian Sisters. For her participation in the First Balkan War, she received the Commemorative Medal for the Liberation of Kosovo. In the Second Balkan War against Bulgaria, she participated at the key Battle of Bregalnica. During the battle, apart from fighting heroically, she and a group of Serbian soldiers helped tens of wounded and abandoned Bulgarian soldiers. For her participation in the Second Balkan War, she received the "Miloš Obilić" Golden Medal for Bravery, and the Commemorative Medal for the 1913 War. She also received two Medals for Diligent Service, believed to date to the Balkan Wars.

=== World War I ===
Sofija Jovanović in war-time 1914.

She joined the Serbian Army under the male name Sofronije Jovanović immediately upon the start of World War I and the first attack of Austria on Serbia. She distinguished herself in the defence of Belgrade (July–December 1914), where the Serbian army stopped the much more powerful Austro-Hungarian army. In July 1914, as part of the Srem Volunteer Detachment, tasked personally by detachment commander Ignjat Kirhner, she commanded a group of guerrillas that crossed the Sava to Srem to reconnoiter enemy positions and cut telephone wires to Semlin (Zemun), interrupting the Austro-Hungarian communications. On 25 August 1914 she was wounded in the left foot (and after the war was registered as a disabled war veteran of the 5th group with 70% body-impairment), but despite this, actively participated in war operations. In September, during the temporary Serbian liberation of Zemun, her guerrilla group seized weapons and ammunition and hoisted a Serbian flag on Austro-Hungarian territory. She then took part in the battles of the Drina (September–November) and Kolubara (November–December 1914). In 1915, a letter from a French female writer widely circulated in Serbia asking for information on Serbian women in the war, especially women soldiers, which the Divisional Army Command reacted negatively to. French war correspondent Henry Barby (1876–1935) wrote on Serbian women soldiers: "I have seen them on the battlefield, with bomb and rifle in hand ... I saw them and admired them!".

The enemy Central Powers launched a massive offensive on Serbia in October 1915, and Belgrade was engulfed in heavy fighting. At the Belgrade Danube quay the Srem Detachment had heavy losses on 24 September, during which Sofija showed exceptional self-sacrifice when she carried bags of ammunition to arm fellow soldiers at the crumbling frontline. Detachment commander Kirhner was wounded and the unit was left with only tens of survived. Belgrade fell and the Serbian army was forced to retreat, at the same time the Bulgarian army invaded from the east and cut the communications to the Allies, leaving the High Command deciding for the Serbian army's retreat through Albania to the Adriatic in the winter of 1915–16. She survived this harsh event and was sent to the Allied hospital in Bizerte where she recuperated. There are insufficient information on her military participation in the breakthrough of the Salonika front and subsequent liberation of Serbia and Belgrade in November 1918.

== Legacy ==
Sofija Jovanović was decorated 10 times for her participation in the 1912–1918 wars, making her one of the most decorated women soldiers in Serbian history. She was nicknamed La Jeanne d'Arc Serbe (The Serbian Joan of Arc) by French reporters. The French Military Archives have several photographs of her and the French Le Petit Journal illustré reported on the "Serbian heroine" with photographs of her and her equipment on the frontlines. Sofija Jovanović has been noted to have not received the same commemoration as fellow women soldier Milunka Savić; there are no streets nor significant memorials dedicated to her. In 2026, there was a theatre play Tales of Blood and Bread (Приче крви и хлеба) based on her life.

== See also ==
- Chetniks in the Balkan Wars – Serbian paramilitary units during the Balkan Wars
- Milunka Savić – Serbian war heroine
- Antonija Javornik – Serbian war heroine, nurse and sergeant
- Živana Terzić – Serbian war heroine
- Mara Petrović – Serbian war heroine
- Lenka Rabasović – Serbian female guerrilla
- Flora Sandes – First World War soldier and nurse (1876–1956)
- Leslie Joy Whitehead – Canadian female soldier
- Women in the military – Women participating in military activities

== Sources ==
- Snodgrass, M.E. (2023). Women Warriors in History: 1,622 Biographies Worldwide from the Bronze Age to the Present. McFarland, Incorporated, Publishers. ISBN 978-1-4766-9305-7.
- Žikić, Milena; Milosavljević, Tanja (2025-07-16). "Six women warriors in Serbian Army history in 1914 and 1915". СИНЕЗА. 6 (2). University of Banja Luka: 1–15. doi:10.63356/sin.2025.012. ISSN 2712-1291.
- Žikić, Milena; Milosavljević, Tanja (2026). "МИЛУНКА САВИЋ И СОФИЈА ЈОВАНОВИЋ У КУЛТУРИ СЕЋАЊА ФРАНЦУСКОГ И СРПСКОГ НАРОДА" [Milunka Savić and Sofija Jovanović in the Culture of Remembrance of the French and Serbian People]. Socioloski Pregled [Sociological Review]. 60 (2): 435-.
- Žikić, Milena (2019). "Софија Јовановић [Sofija Jovanović]". Женe у српским ослободилачким ратовима: (1912-1918). Покрајински завод за равноправност полова. ISBN 978-86-86259-33-2.
- Živković, Jasmina (2014). "Хероине са пушком у руци" [Heroines with rifle in hand]. Zapisi. 3. Istorijski arhiv Požarevac: 99-.
