= Ljubica Čakarević =

Serbian WWI combatant, heroine

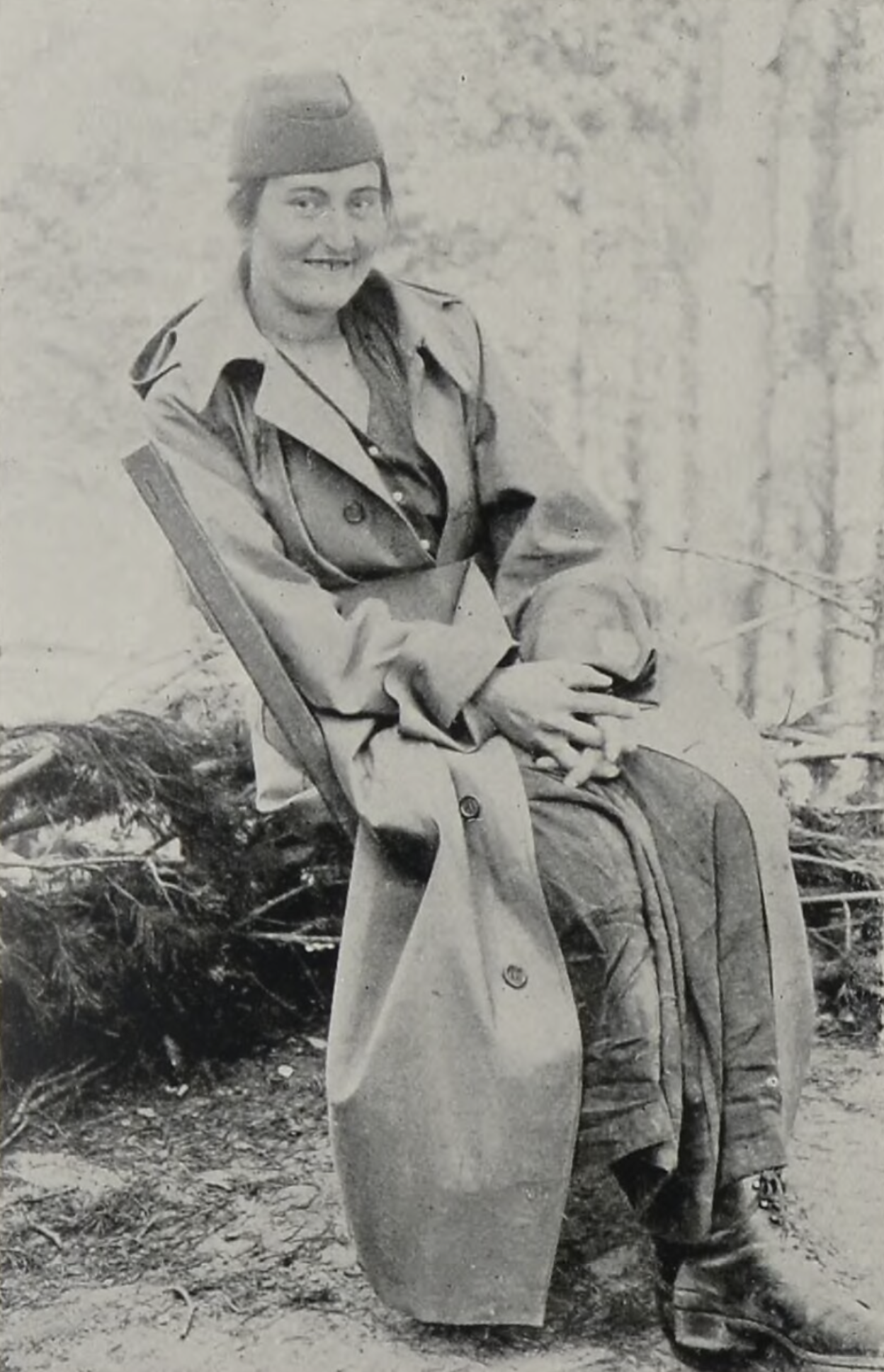
Ljubica Čakarević in a military uniform (c. 1916)

Ljubica Čakarević (Serbian language, Љубица Чакаревић–Ди Сорно; later, Ljubica Čakarević-Di Sorno; 1894–1980) was a Serbian combatant and heroine in World War I.

== Biography ==
Ljubica Čakarević was born in Užice, in 1894. In her early career, she worked as a teacher. When the war broke out, she became a nurse at the Military Hospital in Užice with her sister Milica. She refused to work as a teacher during the occupation. With the group led by Dragutin Jovanović-Lune she arrived at the Salonika front, after 23 days of evading Bulgarian ambushes, and brought the Serbian command valuable information from the occupied homeland. Field Marshals Stepa Stepanović and Živojin Mišić, whom she met at the front, told her that she was the first messenger from Serbia. For this feat, she was awarded the golden medal for bravery “Miloš Obilić“.

After the war ended, Čakarević returned to teaching. In 1921, she married Nikola Di Sorno, son of Italian diplomat Dionisi, who was a consul in Belgrade. They had one child, a daughter, Ida. In the following years, the family lived in Rome, Genoa, and Milan. In 1980, Čakarević came to visit her brother Milutin in Sarajevo where she got sick and died. She was buried in the city's Bare Cemetery. In 2016, her remains were transferred from Sarajevo to her native Užice and she was buried in a family tomb at the Dovarja Cemetery. One street in Uzice is named after her.
