= Antonija Javornik =

Serbian war heroine, nurse and sergeant

- Born: Antonija Javornik; 13 May 1893; Maribor (now Slovenia)
- Died: 16 August 1974 (aged 81); Belgrade, Serbia
- Other name: Natalija Bjelajac
- Military career
- Conflicts: Balkan Wars; World War I
- Awards: Karađorđe's Star, French Legion of Honor, and others (total 12)

Antonija Javornik (Serbian: Антонија Јаворник; 1893–1974) was a Serbian war heroine, nurse and sergeant in the Serbian army during the Balkan Wars and World War I. She was injured in combat twelve times and received twelve medals for bravery.

Antonija Javornik was born on 13 May 1893, in Maribor (now Slovenia), at the time part of Austria-Hungary. She was ethnic ethnic Slovene. After finishing gymnasium, she moved to Kragujevac in Serbia, a few months before the outbreak of the First Balkan War. Her paternal uncle Martin Javornik had earlier deserted the Austro-Hungarian army and joined the Serbian army, becoming a captain in the 11th Infantry Regiment. He served in Kragujevac. She volunteered to participate in the First Balkan War as a nurse in the regimental hospital, although she wished to bear weapons. As a nurse, she followed the Serbian army in Kosovo, Kumanovo, Skopje and Tirana. In the Second Balkan War against Bulgaria, she participated as a soldier, distinguishing herself at Drenka near Kumanovo, receiving the "Miloš Obilić" Medal for Bravery.

Javornik participated in World War I, and initially fought in battles around Šabac, where she received yet another Medal for Bravery. She changed her name into Natalija Bjelajac (Наталија Бјелајац) as to conceal her identity, so that her family back home would not be persecuted. Javornik fought at Cer, Drina and Kolubara. She distinguished herself in the machine gunner crew, receiving a decoration. Her uncle fell at Cer, which made her fight more fervently. She participated in the defence of Belgrade and accompanied the Serbian retreat through Albania. At Kaymakchalan in September 1916, she captured 30 Bulgarian soldiers, and was again decorated, and participated in the liberation of Bitola, and the Crna Bend, being wounded in the latter two. She received the Order of Karađorđe's Star with Swords, following Kaymakchalan and Bitola. She was seriously wounded during the breakthrough of the Salonika Front on 15 September 1918. She recuperated at the Niš military hospital, and lived with a shrapnel piece stuck in her leg. By the end of the war she was ranked sergeant (narednik).

She received 12 decorations, and 12 wounds. After the war, she returned briefly to Maribor, lived a short while in Bosnia, then settled in Belgrade. She was arrested by the Gestapo during the German occupation of Serbia and was held in the Banjica concentration camp for nine months. She died on 16 August 1974, at the anniversary of the Battle of Cer. There is a memorial plaque at the Belgrade Cemetery that reads simply "Natalija Bjelajac, sergeant of the Serbian army".

== Decorations ==
- Medal for Bravery (several).
- Order of the White Eagle with Swords (several).
- Knight of Karađorđe's Star with Swords.
- 1915 Commemorative Medal.
- Knight of the Legion of Honor.
- Russian Medal of St. George (III Class).

== See also ==
- Milunka Savić – Serbian war heroine
- Sofija Jovanović – Serbian war heroine of the Balkan Wars and World War I
- Flora Sandes – First World War soldier and nurse (1876–1956)
- Mara Petrović – Serbian war heroine
- Leslie Joy Whitehead – Canadian female soldier
- Women in the military – Women participating in military activities

== Sources ==
- Vujošević, Lela (2013). "ВЕЛИКЕ ЖЕНЕ ВЕЛИКОГ РАТА". Липар-часопис за књижевност, језик, уметност и културу. 14 (52): 171–188.
- Žikić, Milena (2022). Жене у страним медицинским мисијама на српским ратиштима: 1912-1918. Prometej.
- Žikić, Milena; Milosavljević, Tanja (2025-07-16). "Six women warriors in Serbian Army history in 1914 and 1915". СИНЕЗА. 6 (2). University of Banja Luka: 1–15. doi:10.63356/sin.2025.012. ISSN 2712-1291.
- Živković, Jasmina (2014). "Хероине са пушком у руци" [Heroines with rifle in hand]. Zapisi. 3. Istorijski arhiv Požarevac: 99-.
