= Milunka Savić =

Serbian war heroine

- Милунка Савић
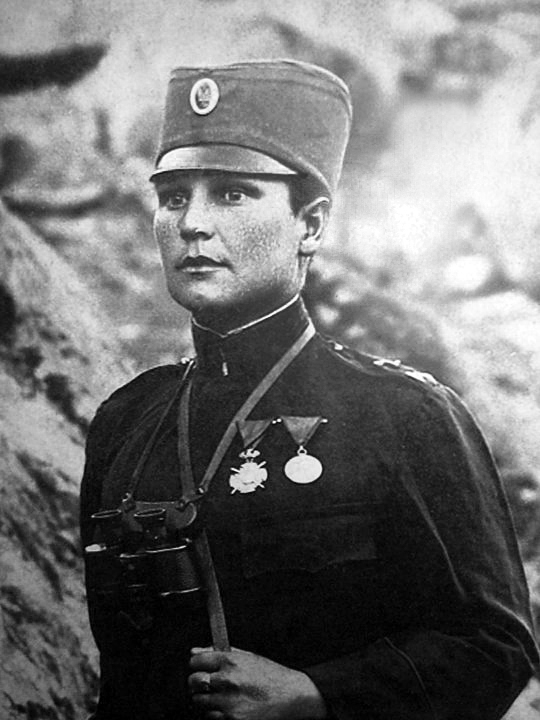
- Sergeant Milunka Savić

Personal details
- Born: 28 June 1892 Koprivnica, Kingdom of Serbia
- Died: 5 October 1973 (age 81) Belgrade, SR Serbia, Yugoslavia
- Awards: Order of the Star of Karađorđe with Swords (twice); Miloš Obilić medal; Légion d’Honneur (twice); Croix de Guerre with gold; Order of St Michael; Order of St. George
- Nickname: Serbian Joan of Arc

Military service
- Allegiance: Kingdom of Serbia (Kingdom of Yugoslavia) Kingdom of Serbs, Croats and Slovenes
- Branch/service: 1st Serbian Army
- Years of service: 1912–1919
- Rank: Sergeant
- Commands: 2nd Infantry Regiment
- Battles/wars: First Balkan War; Battle of Kumanovo; Battle of Prilep; Battle of Bitola; Second Balkan War; Battle of Bregalnica; World War I; Serbian Front; Serbian campaign (1914); Battle of Cer; Battle of the Drina; Battle of Kolubara; Kosovo offensive (1915); Thessaloniki Front; Bitola offensive; Battle of Kaymakchalan; Battle of the Crna Reka (1916); Vardar offensive; Breakthrough at Dobro Pole

Milunka Savić CMG (Serbian Cyrillic: Милунка Савић; June 28, 1892– October 5, 1973) was a Serbian war heroine who fought in the Balkan Wars and in World War I, being wounded nine times and distinguishing herself with immense courage and leadership that led her to becoming the most-decorated female combatant in the history of human warfare.

== Early life ==
Savić was born on 28 June 1892 (St. Vitus Day, Vidovdan) in the village of Kovači in the Raška region, to parents Radenko and Danica, farmers from Koprivnica, where the family house was. She had a brother and two sisters, and the family lived in poverty, with Milunka working as a young shepherd. She did not finish school.

== Military career ==
With the mobilization of the Serbian Army for the First Balkan War against the Ottoman Empire, Savić cut her hair, wore men's clothes and called herself Milun, in order to join the army (as women were exempt from military service). Allegedly, she took the place of her brother's mobilization, however, this is unlikely, as she and others reported that her greatest wish was to help liberate her people with arms, and her brother Milan did serve in the army 1912–1918. The views at the time were that women should not be at the front. At first, she enlisted as a volunteer in the Second Field Army under general Stepa Stepanović, but was sent home. She then went to the Supreme Command in Kragujevac, where vojvoda (field marshal) Radomir Putnik offered her to serve as a nurse, but she declined. Instead, the well-known army major and Chetnik Vojislav Tankosić accepted her into the Rudnik Volunteer Detachment, and from then on, she fought as an active soldier. The regent Alexander had approved her entry into volunteer detachments. Her unit joined the Drina Division and the Siege of Scutari (1912), and she distinguished herself as a bomber (bombaš) in the first war. In the Second Balkan War, against Bulgaria, Savić participated at the important battle of Bregalnica, where she was wounded. Her gender was revealed when the medic was to take care of her chest wound. For wartime achievements and bombing skills, she was awarded the "Miloš Obilić" Golden Medal for Bravery in 1913, one of the highest Serbian military honours. She was also promoted to corporal (kaplar). In both Balkan wars, she served in the Drina Division.

When the First World War broke out in 1914 against the Central Powers, Savić once again volunteered, and was taken in by Tankosić, and eventually assigned to the 2nd Infantry Regiment (known as the "Iron Regiment"). She was part of the 1st Cheta of the 3rd Battalion. She fought at the frontlines against the Austro-Hungarian army as a bomber at Drina, Kolubara and Cer (in August–December 1914). At Drina, she captured soldiers of the enemy 79th Austrian Regiment, and received her first Karađorđe's Star with Swords. At Kolubara, she commanded the assault bomber unit which pushed the Austro-Hungarian army back across the river. In March 1915 the regiment was sent to Macedonia to support the Bregalnica Division, and it defended Bitola and stationed at Struga in November. In 1915, a letter from a French female writer widely circulated in Serbia asking for information on Serbian women in the war, especially women soldiers, which the Divisional Army Command reacted negatively to. French war correspondent Henry Barby (1876–1935) wrote on Serbian women soldiers: "I have seen them on the battlefield, with bomb and rifle in hand ... I saw them and admired them!". Her fellow soldiers called her "Joan of Arc" (Jovanka Orleanka).

In February 1916 the regiment was evacuated to Corfu, where it rested, with her comrades carrying her over the Albanian mountains. The regiment was then transferred to the Salonika Front. She was photographed by nurses of the Scottish Women's Hospital. In 1916, while a junior sergeant, she earned her second Karađorđe's Star with Swords for efforts in the Battle of Gorničevo, the regiment having taken control of the area by 16 September. She was praised at the time by her regiment for her participation in Kaymakchalan and Bitola. At the Crna Bend, the regiment fought under the 122nd French Colonial Division, and in the battle she showed exceptional individual initiative and tactical skills. She jumped into enemy trenches, and managed to capture 23 enemy Bulgarian soldiers. She was wounded, and recuperated at Bizerte and Algiers in French-held northern Africa. There were also two other notable women soldiers in the regiment, Živana Terzić and the British Flora Sandes. Sandes wrote of Milunka's discipline and individualism, and mentioned how she was to be put in a tent instead of receiving a penalty by the lieutenant after withdrawing from the hospital; she burnt down that tent. After recuperating, she was returned to active service on 29 October 1916, and fought an intense battle on the Čuk hill where she was wounded again. On 18 April 1917 she received praise from the Serbian War Command in Thessaloniki. Regent Alexander decorated her with the Golden Karađorđe's Star with Swords, and French general Maurice Sarrail with the Legion of Honor. She participated in the historic breakthrough of the Salonika Front (1918), and had been wounded nine times in combat. Her wounds came from artillery shrapnel, bullets and bayonets. In mid-1918, the Allied Command wrote a praise to the heroism of Milunka Savić, to be read loud to all units of the Entente.

For her efforts in World War I, she received the French War Cross with the Golden Palm, being the only woman to receive it.

While in the Rudnik Volunteer Detachment, in 1912.

Milunka with Karađorđe's Star and Obilić Medal.

Milunka with a rifle.

Milunka with the Karađorđe's Star with Swords.

Milunka on the Salonika Front.

Milunka posing for a photograph after the wars.

== Post-war life ==
Le Petit Journal reported on her, the "Serbian heroine". She was demobilized in 1919, while the Serbian army was demobilized by 1920. After the war Milunka moved to Bosnia where she worked as a cook, nurse and in the textile industry. She turned down an offer to move to France, where she was eligible to collect a comfortable French army pension. She married in 1923 to Veljko Gligorijević, who was much younger than her, and the two had a daughter. The marriage was short, reportedly the husband left her early, or it was an unhappy marriage and they divorced. She adopted three more daughters (Milka, Radmila–Višnja and Zorka), and was a foster parent of 30 or 32 children throughout her life. As a volunteer, she received a plot outside Novi Sad where she built a house that she eventually gifted to her sister, and then moved to Belgrade, in 1928, and worked as a cleaning lady at the Mortgage Bank. During the German occupation in World War II, her house became a field hospital for guerrillas against the occupation. She received a small pension from the Communist government following the war. She lived a very modest life and worked to help others. She died at age 81, on 5 October 1973.

Her remains were re-buried at the Alley of the Greats in the Belgrade New Cemetery, with seven of her decorations presented on her coffin.

== Decorations ==
- Several "Miloš Obilić" Golden and Silver Medals for Bravery, first one in 1913.
- Commemorative Medal "Avenged Kosovo" in 1913.
- French War Cross.
- French Legion of Honor (twice).
- Karađorđe Star with Swords (twice).
- Albanian Memorial of 1915.
- Commemorative Medal of the War of Liberation and Unification of 1914–1918.
- Russian Cross of St. George.
- British Order of St Michael and St George.

== Legacy ==
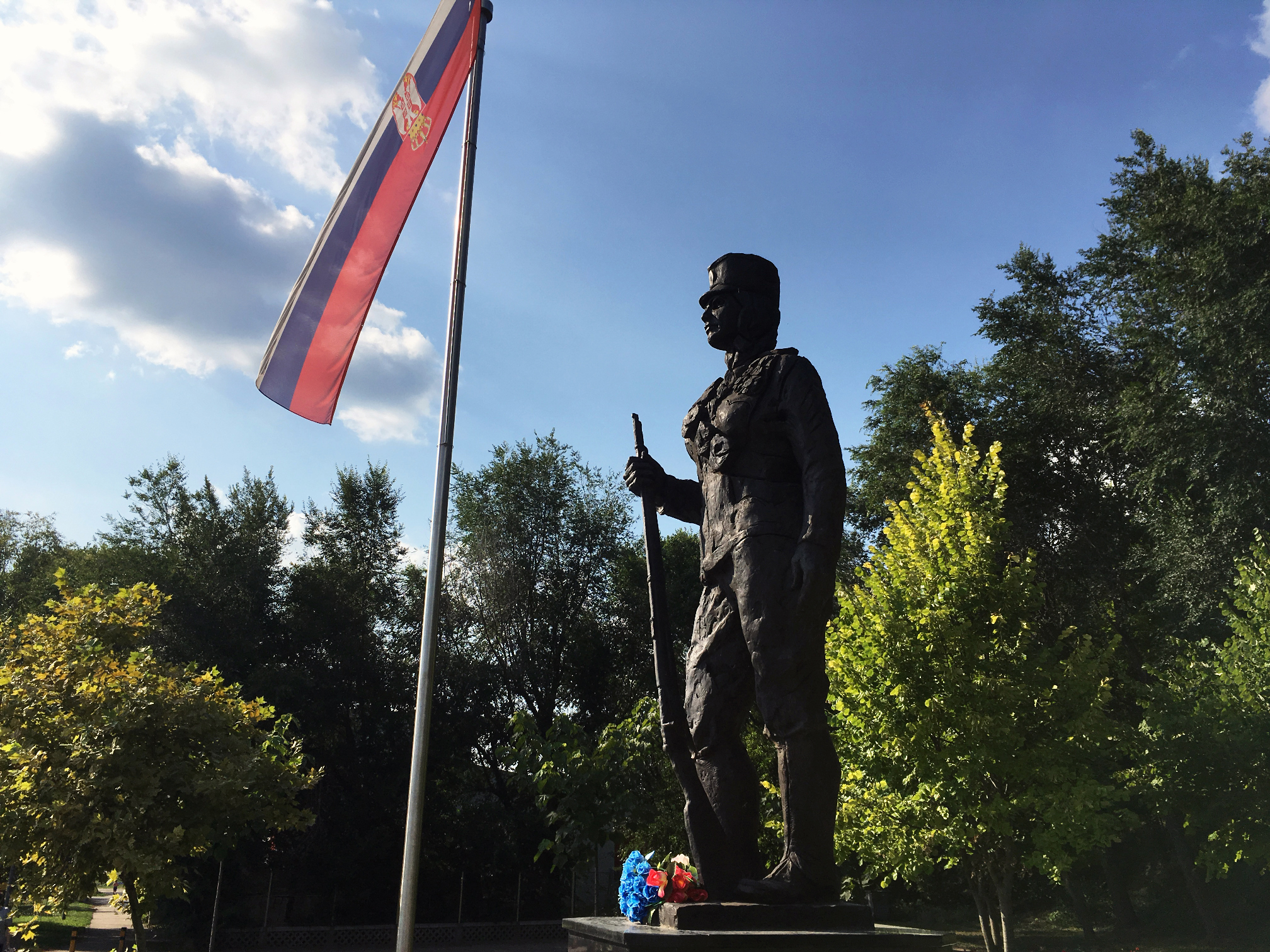
A statue of Milunka Savić in Inđija.

In 2013 the Home of the Army in Belgrade had an exhibition on Milunka Savić. The family house in Koprivnica was renovated in 2015 and made into an touristic exhibition. A memorial complex with a permanent exhibition devoted to Milunka Savić was opened in October 2020 in Jošanička Banja.

Dobrica Erić wrote the song Another Order for Milunka in December 2009. In 2022, Swedish heavy metal band Sabaton covered her story in their song "Lady of the Dark".

A monument to Savić was unveiled in Belgrade in 2024.

She is the most-decorated female combatant in the history of human warfare, and the best-known Serbian women soldier. Historiography has likened her to Joan of Arc, and newspapers and historiography has called her a Serbian Joan of Arc (Jovanka Orleanka). She is the only woman in history that received the French War Cross with the Golden Palm.

== See also ==
- Sofija Jovanović – Serbian war heroine of the Balkan Wars and World War I
- Živana Terzić – Serbian war heroine
- Mara Petrović – Serbian war heroine
- Slavka Tomić – Serbian war heroine
- Flora Sandes – First World War soldier and nurse (1876–1956)
- Antonija Javornik – Serbian war heroine, nurse and sergeant
- Ecaterina Teodoroiu – World War I soldier and nurse
- Maria Bochkareva – Russian female soldier and counter revolutionary
- Leslie Joy Whitehead – Canadian female soldier
- Women in the military – Women participating in military activities

== Sources ==
- Graovac, Srđan (8 April 2018), Милунка Савић – хероина Гвозденог пука, Културни центар Новог Сада
- Mladenović, Božica B. (2014). "ГВОЗДЕНИ ПУК И ХЕРОИНЕ У РАТОВИМА СРБИЈЕ 1912-1918". In Lekić, Dragan R. (ed.). Други пешадијски пук „Књаз Михаило “–Гвоздени пук у Ослободилачким ратовима 1912–1918. године. Историјски архив Топлице - Прокупље. pp. 75-.
- Žikić, Milena; Milosavljević, Tanja (2025-07-16). "Six women warriors in Serbian Army history in 1914 and 1915". СИНЕЗА. 6 (2). University of Banja Luka: 1–15. doi:10.63356/sin.2025.012. ISSN 2712-1291.
- Žikić, Milena; Milosavljević, Tanja (2026). "МИЛУНКА САВИЋ И СОФИЈА ЈОВАНОВИЋ У КУЛТУРИ СЕЋАЊА ФРАНЦУСКОГ И СРПСКОГ НАРОДА" [Milunka Savić and Sofija Jovanović in the Culture of Remembrance of the French and Serbian People]. Socioloski Pregled [Sociological Review]. 60 (2): 435-.
- Živković, Jasmina (2014). "Хероине са пушком у руци" [Heroines with rifle in hand]. Zapisi. 3. Istorijski arhiv Požarevac: 99-.
