= Leslie Joy Whitehead =

Canadian female soldier

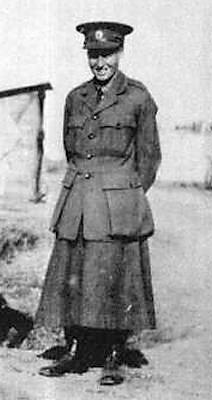
- Whitehead in her Serbian Relief Fund uniform
- Born: February 26, 1895; Quebec, Canada
- Died: June 5, 1964 (aged 69); Vancouver, British Columbia, Canada
- Spouse(s): Vukota Vojinovitch/Voyinovitch/Vojinović; George Andrew Vaughan
- Children: 3
- Relatives: Charles Ross Whitehead (Father)
- Military career
- Allegiance: Kingdom of Serbia
- Branch: Royal Serbian Army
- Service years: 1915–1916

Leslie Joy Whitehead (Serbian Cyrillic: Лесли Џој Вајтхед, February 26, 1895 – June 5, 1964), known as Josephine, Joy, or Jo, was a Canadian female soldier during the First World War. Whitehead was one of a number of women from the western world to enter the frontline as a combatant during World War I after she enlisted as a man in the Royal Serbian Army at the age of 22. During her time on the Balkan Front, she would go on to work as a military engineer, a guard for the Scottish Women's Hospitals, and become a prisoner of war under the Bulgarian Army following the invasion of Belgrade on October 8, 1915.

== Early life ==
Whitehead was born to Charles Ross Whitehead, a cotton manufacturer from Montmorency, Quebec, and Winifred Thomas Stevenson. She grew up with her two younger brothers, William and Pillans in the city of Trois-Rivières, Quebec, Canada. Though little is known of Whitehead's early years, her pursuits in adult life centred largely around what would have been deemed traditionally male activities. It has been widely reported that in her young adulthood Whitehead took a keen interest in shooting, driving, and the great outdoors. Prior to the start of the First World War, Whitehead spent a significant amount of time living alone in the Canadian wilderness. According to an article from January 8, 1916 in the Manitoba Free Press, Winnipeg, Whitehead lived an "outdoor life" for "a couple of years […] in the Laurentian Mountains at Val Morina". The Toronto Daily Star also reported that "Miss Whitehead" was "extremely fond of outdoor life, wore semi-male garb on her tramps through the woods, and could handle a canoe or shoot better than most men".

== War Work ==
=== Early work and volunteering ===
When Canada entered the Great War on August 4, 1914 Whitehead was only 19 years old but already resolute in her pursuit of getting to the Front, where she hoped "to get fixed as a motor transport or ambulance driver". As for many women whose true desire lay in getting to the thick of the action on the frontlines, however, Whitehead initially started her war-work away from the firing lines. Travelling to London, England, Whitehead volunteered, alongside "a batch of young ladies from Canada", to work "long hours over the card index and the typewriter in order to", as the Yorkshire Evening Post reported on June 3, 1915, "keep the people of" her "own country informed of the condition of the wounded among the Canadian contingent". This newspaper described "Miss Whitehead" as "a lady volunteer of a very different kind" because she could "do almost anything in the out-of-door life", and was "desirous of putting her handiness at the disposal of the military authorities". During the Great War, however, the Western Front was completely forbidden to women. Conflict zones were deemed far too dangerous a place for the "weaker sex" to be, with some even considering it an abomination that the female life-giver should enter the battlefield, where she stood to witness brutal and unrelenting loss of life. The few women that did get to this front were, then, either branded "camp followers" (i.e. prostitutes) or, as in the case of sapper Dorothy Lawrence (the only English woman to cross-dress as a soldier and to gain access to the Western Front in this capacity), sent back to England in a state of disgrace. Whitehead was, however, determined in her goal. Like the women doctors of the Scottish Women's Hospitals, she decided to offer her services to Britain and the Commonwealth's Allies; a decision that would ultimately lead her to Serbia. It was following this Balkan country's acceptance of her help that Whitehead became a volunteer engineer with the Serbian Relief Fund in July 1915. Jo worked at a hospital alongside her friend Dorothea Maude who described Jo in her diaries as "an attractive boy-girl... she wears a kilt and short hair and looks just like a boy." The kilt Jo wore instead of the typical women's uniform earned her the nickname "Kiltie."

=== With the Serbian Army ===
Whitehead enlisted as a man in the Royal Serbian Army at the age of 22. Once in Serbia, Whitehead found herself able to freely live life like a man. This liberty was to be cut short, however, when on October 8, 1915, Serbia fell to Central Power forces. By November 3, 1915, Whitehead was working under occupation in the central Serbian city of Kruševac. According to Dr Catherine Corbett of the Scottish Women's Hospitals Second Serbian unit, this female engineer had been sent to Kruševac with the Serbian army within which she had "enlisted as a man". According to contemporary newspaper sources, Whitehead was "acting as a lieutenant in the Veterinary Corps of the Serbian Army, having given up hospital work" so "she might get closer to the firing line" when Serbia's occupation began. Under occupation, Whitehead's deftness with guns and outdoor skills were to prove more vital than ever before and came in particularly useful for the Scottish Women's Hospitals. Finding themselves frequently targeted by thieves in the form of desperate locals, prisoners of war and enemies alike, the Scottish Women's Hospitals recruited Whitehead as a "guard" in the hopes that she would help to deter the near-daily pillaging of resources and supplies. Her handiness did not go unnoticed by the enemy and by November 24, 1915, Whitehead found herself under the employment of "a German doctor", for whom she tended to "some large and complicated disinfectors".

=== Prisoner of war ===
It is unclear what exactly happened to Whitehead between November 1915 and the end of 1916, but by January 7, 1916, both the Toronto Daily Star and The Globe reported that "Miss Joy Whitehead, a Quebec Athletic Girl" had been "locked up" by the Bulgarians. At the time of being made a prisoner of war, The Globe cites Whitehead "was captured by the Bulgarians while serving with a British veterinary corps in Serbia" – a division she had joined "owing to her knowledge of horses".

== Personal life and death ==
At some point during her time as a prisoner of war (c. 1916), Whitehead met and married a lieutenant of the Royal Serbian Army named Vukota Vojinović (a.k.a. Vojinovitch/Voyinovitch) from the city of Užice. The pair returned to Canada where Whitehead gave birth to her first child, a daughter named Mila, in October 1917. The couple went on to have a second daughter in 1922 named Winifred Dana, followed by a son named Miladin (later Dean) in 1923. By this time the young family had travelled together to Naples, Italy, as well as to Patras, Greece. The family eventually settled in Sparks, Nevada in the United States. By the late 1920s, Whitehead's marriage to Vukota had deteriorated and Jo filed for divorce. The divorce was approved on the grounds of extreme cruelty by a Nevada judge on August 10, 1927. By 1937 Whitehead had re-married a man named George Andrew Vaughan. The pair lived together in British Columbia, Canada and remained married until George's death on October 9, 1944. The couple had at least one child together, a son named David.

Whitehead died a widow in Princeton, British Columbia on June 5, 1964, aged 69, after developing a carcinoma of the stomach.

== See also ==
- Milunka Savić – Serbian war heroine
- Olive Kelso King – Australian adventurer and WWI ambulance driver (1885–1958)
- Ecaterina Teodoroiu – World War I soldier and nurse
- Maria Bochkareva – Russian female soldier and counter revolutionary
- Flora Sandes – First World War soldier and nurse (1876–1956)
- Women in the military – Women participating in military activities
- Emancipation of women – Range of socio-political movements and ideologies

== Sources ==
This article incorporates text by Natasha Stoyce and Alan Cumming available under the CC BY-SA 3.0 license.
