= Flora Sandes =

First World War soldier and nurse (1876–1956)

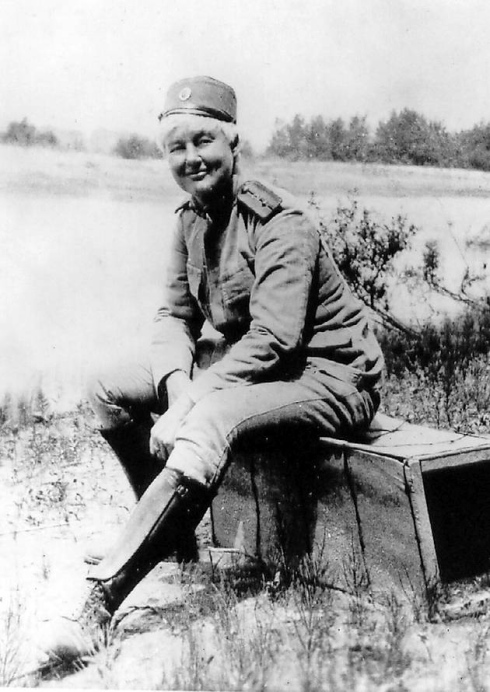
- Sandes in Serbian Army uniform, c. 1918
- Born: 22 January 1876; Nether Poppleton, Yorkshire, England
- Died: 24 November 1956 (aged 80); Ipswich, Suffolk, England
- Military career
- Allegiance: Kingdom of Serbia
- Branch: Serbian Army
- Service years: 1914–1922
- Rank: Senior Captain
- Conflicts: World War I: Battle of Bitola
- Awards: Order of the Star of Karađorđe

Flora Sandes (Serbian Cyrillic: Флора Сендс, 22 January 1876 – 24 November 1956) was a British woman who served as a member of the Royal Serbian Army in World War I. She was the only British woman officially to serve as a soldier in that war. Initially a St John Ambulance volunteer, she travelled to the Kingdom of Serbia, where she was welcomed and formally enrolled in the Serbian army. She was subsequently promoted to the rank of sergeant major, and, after the war, to senior captain. She was decorated with seven medals.

== Biography ==
=== Early life ===
Flora Sandes was born on 22 January 1876 in Nether Poppleton, Yorkshire, as the youngest daughter of an Irish family. Her father was Samuel Dickson Sandes (1822–1914), the former rector of Whitchurch, County Cork, and her mother was Sophia Julia (née Besnard). When she was nine years old, the family moved to Marlesford, Suffolk; and later to Thornton Heath, near Croydon, Surrey. As a child she was educated by governesses. She enjoyed riding and shooting and said that she wished she had been born a boy. She learned to drive, and drove an old French racing car. She took a job as a secretary.

In her spare time, Sandes trained with the First Aid Nursing Yeomanry (FANY), founded in 1907 as an all-women mounted paramilitary organisation, learning first aid, horsemanship, signalling and drill. She left the FANY in 1910, joining another renegade, Mabel St Clair Stobart, in the formation of the Women's Sick and Wounded Convoy Corps. The Convoy saw service in Serbia and Bulgaria in 1912 during the First Balkan War. At the outbreak of the First World War in 1914, she volunteered to become a nurse, but was rejected due to a lack of qualifications.

=== Military career ===
Sandes nonetheless joined a St John Ambulance unit raised by American nurse Mabel Grouitch, and on 12 August 1914 left England for Serbia with a group of 36 women to try to aid the humanitarian crises there. They arrived at the town of Kragujevac which was the base for the Serbian forces fighting against the Austro-Hungarian offensive. Sandes joined the Serbian Red Cross and worked in an ambulance for the Serbian Army's 2nd Infantry Regiment. In 1914 she went riding with a Serbian soldier who, impressed with her equestrian skills, told her she was wasted as a nurse and should enlist as a soldier; she told Dr Isabel Emslie, "I've always wished to be a soldier and to fight."

In 1915 Sandes struggled persistently to get to the front (despite the efforts of people such as the British Consul, who instructed her to return to safety), eventually joining the ambulance of the Second Regiment at the Babuna Pass. During the Great Retreat through Albania, all the other ambulance staff fled or were killed. Sandes could no longer make herself useful as a nurse and was enrolled as a private by General Miloš Vasić. She quickly advanced to the rank of corporal. She recounted later that to formalize the change she removed her Red Cross badge and replaced it with the brass regimental figures from Colonel Milich's epaulettes. In 1916, during the Serbian advance on Bitola (Monastir), Sandes was seriously wounded by a grenade in hand to hand combat. She subsequently received the highest decoration of the Serbian Military, the Order of the Karađorđe's Star. At the same time, she was promoted to the rank of sergeant major.

Also in 1916, Sandes published her autobiography, An English Woman-Sergeant in the Serbian Army, based on her letters and diaries. She used this account to help her raise funds for the Serbian Army, and was compared with the writings for Dr Caroline Matthews 'Experiences of a Woman Doctor in Serbia'. With Evelina Haverfield, Sandes founded the Hon. Evelina Haverfield's and Sergt-Major Flora Sandes' Fund for Promoting Comforts for Serbian Soldiers and Prisoners. Unable to continue fighting due to her injury, she spent the remainder of the war running a hospital. In June 1919, a special Act of Parliament was passed in Serbia that made her the Serbian Army's first female commissioned officer. She was finally demobilised in October 1922.

=== Later life ===
In May 1927, Sandes married Yuri Yudenitch, a former Russian White Army general officer. The couple lived for a time in France, but afterwards returned to Serbia (which had become part of the Kingdom of Yugoslavia), and settled in Belgrade. Among other jobs, Sandes drove Belgrade's first taxicab. Also in 1927, she published a second autobiography. She lectured extensively on her wartime experiences in the United Kingdom, Australia, New Zealand, France, Canada and the United States. She wore her military uniform while delivering her lectures.

When, during the Second World War, Germany launched its attack on Yugoslavia in April 1941, Sandes and Yudenitch were recalled to military service, but the invasion was over before they could take up any military duties. They were briefly interned by the Germans, before being released on parole. Yudenitch fell ill, was removed to hospital, and died there in September 1941.

Sandes subsequently returned to England. She spent the last years of her life in Suffolk, living at Lower Hacheston near Wickham Market. She died at the East Suffolk and Ipswich Hospital on 24 November 1956. She was cremated at Ipswich Crematorium and her ashes scattered in the Garden of Remembrance. In St Andrew's Church in Marlesford, a memorial plaque on the south wall in the choir stalls is dedicated to her.

== Legacy ==
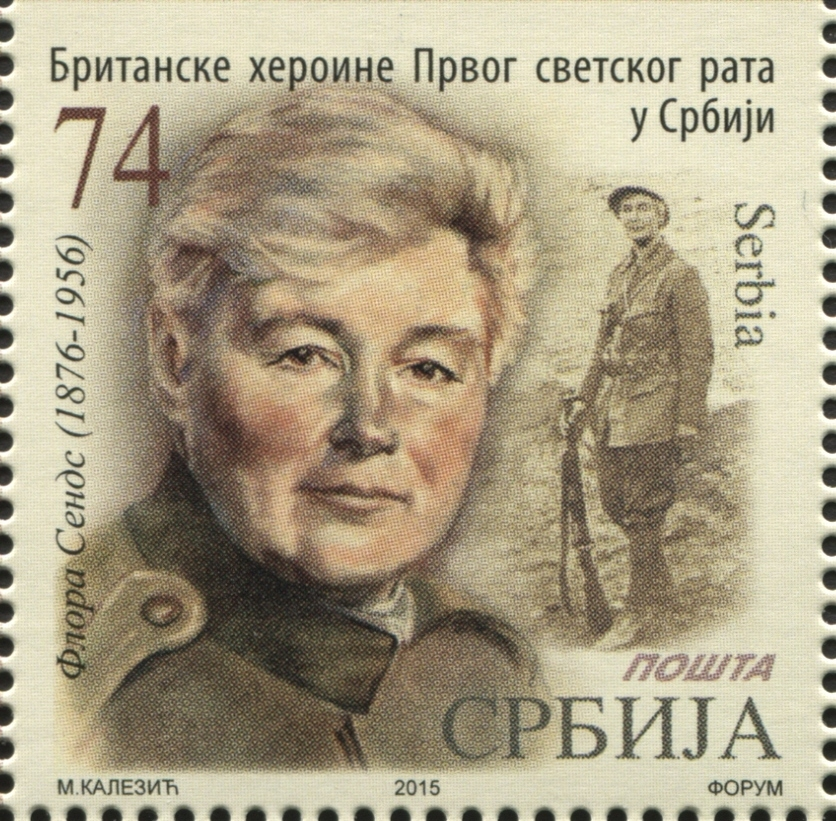
Sandes on a 2015 stamp of Serbia

- In 1920, the sculptor Alice Meredith Williams made a painted plaster model of Flora Sandes in action for the Imperial War Museum, where it remains.
- In 2009 a street in Belgrade was named after her.
- There was formerly a Wetherspoon pub named "The Flora Sandes" in her honour in Thornton Heath. It closed in 2018.

== In popular culture ==
- Our Englishwoman, a television film based on the biography of Flora Sandes and directed by Slobodan Radovitch, was produced in 1997 by the Serbian broadcasting service RTS.
- The last track of the album England Green and England Grey by Reg Meuross is "The Ballad of Flora Sandes". It is an interpretation of her life.

== See also ==
- Milunka Savić – Serbian war heroine
- Olive Kelso King – Australian adventurer and WWI ambulance driver (1885–1958)
- Ecaterina Teodoroiu – World War I soldier and nurse
- Maria Bochkareva – Russian female soldier and counter revolutionary
- Leslie Joy Whitehead – Canadian female soldier
- Women in the military – Women participating in military activities
- Emancipation of women – Range of socio-political movements and ideologies
- Sofija Jovanović – Serbian war heroine (1895–1979)

== Bibliography ==
=== Autobiographies ===
- Sandes, Flora (1916). An English Woman-Sergeant in the Serbian Army. London: Hodder & Stoughton.
- Sandes, Flora (1927). The Autobiography of a Woman Soldier: A Brief Record of Adventure with the Serbian Army 1916–1919. London: H.F. & G. Witherby.

=== Other sources ===
- Anon. (1 December 1956). "Obituary: Miss Flora Sandes: Combatant in Serbian Army". The Times. London. p. 8. (subscription required)
- Burgess, Alan (1963). The Lovely Sergeant. London: Heinemann. OL 5847758M. (This work is based on Sandes' two autobiographies and other historical sources, but also includes imaginative dialogue and passages.)
- Kitching, Paula (2013). "Four Faces of Nursing and the First World War". The Historian. 119: 30–35.
- Lee, J. (2006). "A Nurse and a Soldier: Gender, Class and National Identity in the First World War Adventures of Grace McDougall and Flora Sandes". Women's History Review. 15 (1): 83–103. doi:10.1080/09612020500440903. S2CID 143789145.
- MacMahon, Bryan (2005–2006). "Captain Flora Sandes of the Serbian Army". Irish Sword. 25: 419–436.
- Miller, Louise (2012). A Fine Brother: The Life of Captain Flora Sandes. Richmond, Surrey: Alma Books. ISBN 9781846881848.
- Shipton, Elisabeth (2014). Female Tommies: The Frontline Women of the First World War. Stroud: The History Press. ISBN 9780752491431.
- Wheelwright, Julie (1989). "Flora Sandes: Military Maid". History Today. 39 (3): 42–48.
- Wheelwright, Julie (1989). Amazons and Military Maids: Women Who Dressed as Men in the Pursuit of Life, Liberty and Happiness. London: Pandora. ISBN 0-04-440356-9. OL 3393908W.
- Wheelwright, Julie (2004). "Yudenitch [Yudenich], Flora Sandes (1876–1956)". Oxford Dictionary of National Biography (online ed.). Oxford University Press. doi:10.1093/ref:odnb/49662. (Subscription, Wikipedia Library access or UK public library membership required.)
