= Medal of the Red Cross =

Medal of the Red Cross or Red Cross Medal may refer to:

- Medal of the Red Cross (Netherlands)
- German Red Cross Decoration
- Red Cross Medal (Oldenburg)
- Red Cross Medal (Prussia)
- Royal Red Cross, United Kingdom
- Portuguese Red Cross Decorations
- Red Cross Medal of Merit (Serbia)
- Order of the Red Cross (Serbia)
