= Edgar Erskine Hume =

United States Army general

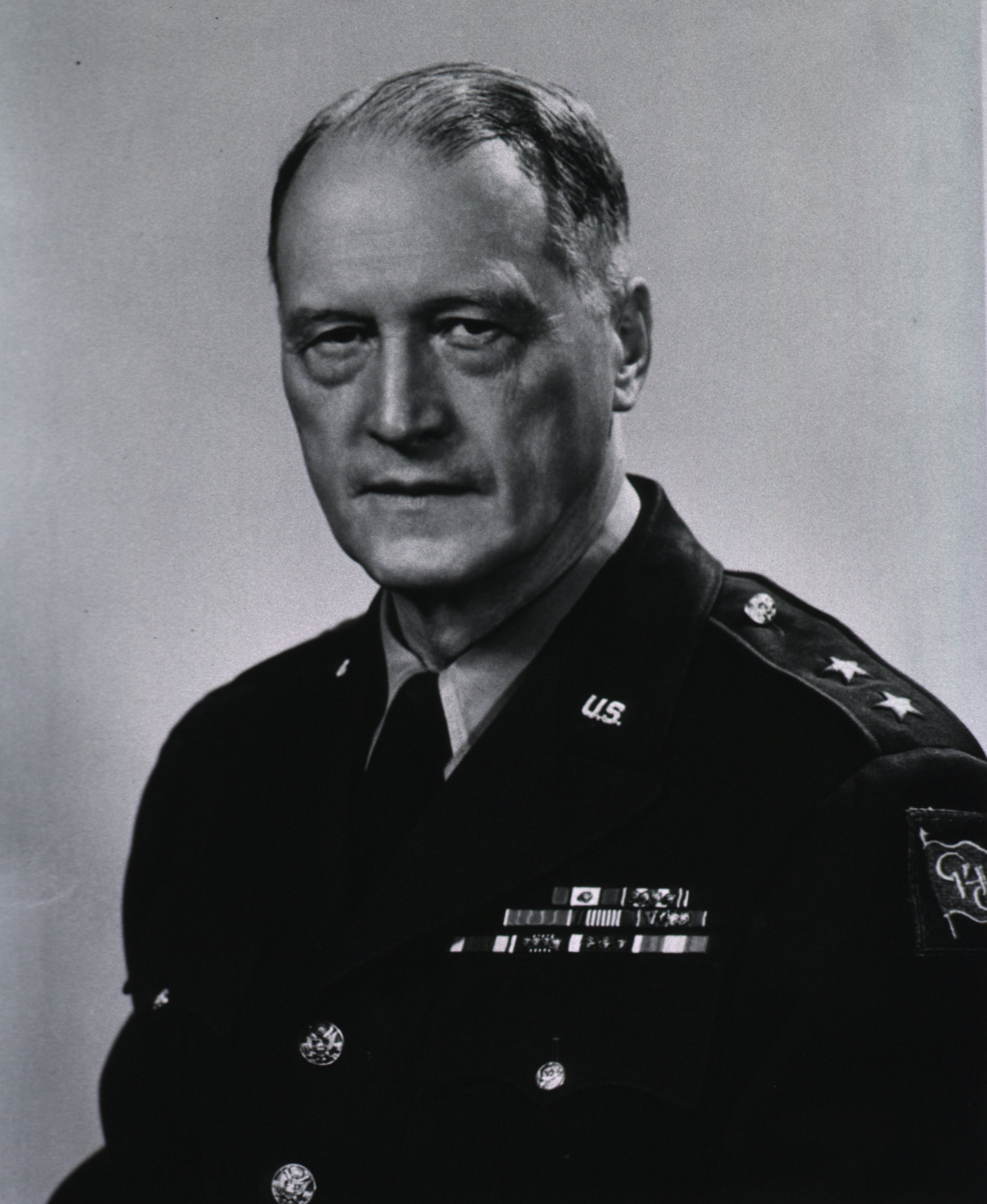
- Major General Edgar Erskine Hume
- Born: 26 December 1889; Frankfort, Kentucky
- Died: 24 January 1952 (aged 62); Walter Reed Hospital
- Burial place: Arlington National Cemetery
- Spouse: Mary Swigert Hendrick (m. 1918)
- Military career
- Allegiance: United States
- Branch: United States Army
- Service years: 1917–1951
- Rank: Major general
- Service number: 04033
- Unit: Medical Corps
- Awards: see below

Edgar Erskine Hume CBE FRSE MD (26 December 1889 – 24 January 1952) was an American physician, Major General in the U.S. Army medical corps, writer and amateur ornithologist. At the time of his retirement from the Army he was the most decorated medical officer in American history.

== Early life ==
Edgar Erskine Hume was born at the Capital Hotel in Frankfort, Kentucky on 26 December 1889, the only son of Dr. Enoch Edgar Hume and his wife, Mary Ellen South. He had a sister called Eleanor Marion, born at "Roselawn" the home of their maternal grandparents. He received his preliminary education at the Frankfort High School and the Franklin Institute and entered college in 1904.

Hume studied medicine at Centre College in Kentucky, being the youngest member of the class, graduating BA in 1908 and MA in 1909. While at Centre College he was a member of the Kappa Alpha Order fraternity. In the same year he entered Johns Hopkins University where he gained his degree of Doctor of Medicine after four years in 1913.

He then did further postgraduate studies in Europe, first in Prof. Friedrich von Müller's Clinic at the Ludwig-Maximilians-Universität München in Germany (1914) then, after the mobilisation of the German army, in the Polyclinic Umberto I at the University of Rome in Italy (1915). After the earthquake in the Abruzzi mountains in January 1915, Hume was put in charge of the medical relief expedition organized by the U.S. Ambassador to Italy. He stayed in the country until recalled to America by his mother's death in 1916.

In 1916 he passed the examination for admission to the Medical Corps of the Army, standing first among the candidates. He was commissioned First Lieutenant in the Medical Reserve Corps and admitted to the Army Medical School in Washington, D.C. He graduated in February 1917, as first honor graduate, receiving a commission as First Lieutenant in the Regular Army.

== Military career ==
In the First World War he served in base hospitals in Italy. During September 1918, he was sent to France for temporary duty with several American units, and with the British Expeditionary Force, during the Meuse–Argonne offensive and the Battle of Saint-Mihiel, he was attached to the B.E.S General Hospital No. 12 in Rouen. From October to November 1918 he was Commanding Officer of the American Army Field Hospitals with the 3rd, 4th, and 8th Italian Armies during the Battle of Vittorio Veneto.

After the armistice, in February 1919, Lt. Colonel Hume was appointed Chief Medical Officer for State of Slovenes, Croats and Serbs, to have charge of the anti-typhus campaign in the State of Slovenes, Croats and Serbs, leading a team of eighteen physicians of the Medical Corps of the Army, working alongside Serbian Surgeon General Colonel Sondermeir. In June he was made American Red Cross Commissioner for State of Slovenes, Croats and Serbs, he was the only active duty medical officer involved, he then became in charge of all American Red Cross activities in that part of the Balkans and with the Allied Army of Occupation in Hungary. He was next on temporary duty with the American Forces in Germany and for two months as assistant to the Surgeon in the Post Hospital at Antwerp.

In August 1920, after a year and a half in the Balkans, Lt. Colonel Hume was ordered home to America where in November 1920 he was assigned to duty as assistant to the commanding officer of the Corps Area Laboratory at Fort Banks, Massachusetts, and later as Commanding Officer until June 1922. On his own time he attended classes at Harvard and M.I.T., receiving a certificate in public health ( changed later to Master of Public Health) from M.I.T. and a diploma in tropical medicine from Harvard.

In 1924 he was assigned to the Army Medical Library in Washington DC, to replace Fielding Hudson Garrison first as Assistant Librarian, for two years he worked in the institution assisting Albert Allemann. Concurrently he attended Johns Hopkins and received the degree of doctor of public health. It was during this second period at Johns Hopkins that he founded, together with fellow graduate Claude William Mitchell, the Delta Omega honorary society, a national honor society for public health. In 1926 Hume served at Fort Benning until 1930, then instructed in the New Hampshire and Massachusetts National Guard.

In 1932 the position of librarian at the Army Medical Library became available and Hume occupied it until October 1936. While a librarian he wrote an essay for the Military Surgeon which won the Wellcome Prize for 1933. During this period he grew to fame as an amateur ornithologist and was elected a Fellow of the Royal Society of Edinburgh in 1933. His proposers were Dr William Joseph Maloney, Joseph Wedderburn and fellow-Americans Robert Foster Kennedy and Richard Lightburn Sutton. Curiously he was an Ordinary Fellow rather than Honorary, which required his physical presence in Edinburgh for his induction. At the end of his term as Librarian, Hume was assigned to study at the Medical Field Service School at Carlisle Barracks before becoming Commanding Officer of the Winter General Hospital in Topeka, Kansas. Colonel Hume left the hospital to attend the School of Military Government in Charlottesville.

In 1943, during the Second World War, he was assigned to General Eisenhower's North African staff for the invasion of Sicily. Following the invasion he was Chief of Public Health for Sicily from July 1943 to August 1943 when he was promoted to Chief of the Allied Military Government for Gen. Mark Clark's 5th Army's Italian sector. Hume accepted the surrender of Naples in September 1943. Following Germany's surrender, in May 1945, he became Chief of the Military Government for the whole US zone of Austria. He returned to Washington two years later in June 1947.

For the next two years, he served as Chief of the Reorientation Branch within the Civil Affairs Division of the Department of the Army in Washington, D.C. He was awarded the Gorgas Award by the Medical Reserve Corps Association of New York in 1948.

In June 1949 he was appointed Chief Surgeon of the Far East command under General MacArthur; thereafter he was director-general of medical services of the United Nations Command in Korea; and surgeon on the staff of the Supreme Commander for Allied Powers. In July 1950 he became Director-General of Medical Services in Korea a position he held from MacArthur's headquarters in Tokyo until the end of the Allied occupation.

== Retirement and death ==
Hume came back to the U.S. and retired on 31 December 1951 with the rank of Major General. Three weeks later, on 20 January 1952, as President General of the Society of the Cincinnati, he presented the hereditary membership insignia of the Society to British Prime Minister Winston Churchill.

On 24 January 1952, Hume had an aneurysm of the aorta and died the same day at the Walter Reed Army Medical Center. Hume is buried in Arlington National Cemetery.

== Personal life ==
In July 1918, prior to going on active duty in the First World War, he married Mary Swigert Hendrick of Frankfort who came from a distinguished line of Kentucky pioneer ancestry. She joined him while he was still on duty in Serbia and shared many of his travels. They had a son Edgar Erskine Hume Jr.

== Publications ==
The list of Edgar E Hume's publications reached over four hundred titles. He wrote histories, biographies, science and sociology but also critical and philosophical essays.

- Max von Pettenkofer. His Theory of the Etiology of Cholera, Typhoid Fever & Other Intestinal Diseases, a Review of His Arguments and Evidence (1927)
- Lafayette and the Society of Cincinnati (1934)
- Peter Johnston, Junior: Virginia Soldier and Jurist (1935)
- Colonel Heros von Borcke, a Famous Prussian Volunteer in the Confederate States Army: Southern Sketches, No. Two, First Series (1935)
- Lafayette in Kentucky (1937)
- Papers of the Society of the Cincinnati in the State of Virginia 1783–1824 (1938)
- Medical Work Of The Knights Hospitallers Of Saint John Of Jerusalem (1940)
- Colonel Theodore O'Hara, Author Of The Bivouac Of The Dead, Southern Sketches No. 6 (1941)
- The golden jubilee of the Association of military surgeons of the United States, A history of its first half-century 1891–1941 (1941)
- Ornithologists of the United States Army Medical Corps, Thirty-six biographies (1942)
- Victories of Army Medicine: Scientific Accomplishments of the Medical Department of the United States Army (1943)
- Allied Military Government of Rome Under the Fifth Army (1944)

== Awards and decorations ==
At the battle of Vittorio Veneto, he was wounded and received his first medal for heroism. He was wounded twice in Italy during World War II and twice in Korea. By the time he reached the end of his career, he was the most decorated medical officer in the Army. In 1944 he was authorized to use his title of Count of Hume de Chérisy by King Umberto II of Italy (then Regent of the Kingdom of Italy as Luogotenente generale).

=== United States ===
- Distinguished Service Medal with 2 oak leaf clusters
- Silver Star with 4 oak leaf clusters
- Legion of Merit
- Soldier's Medal
- Bronze Star Medal with "V" device and 4 oak leaf clusters
- Air Medal with 2 oak leaf clusters
- Army Commendation Medal with 2 oak leaf clusters
- Purple Heart with 4 oak leaf clusters
- World War I Victory Medal
- American Defense Service Medal
- European-African-Middle Eastern Campaign Medal with 3 campaign stars
- World War II Victory Medal
- Army of Occupation Medal with "Germany" and "Japan" clasps
- National Defense Service Medal

=== Foreign ===
Major General Edgar E Hume was decorated by 37 countries in Europe and Latin America.

- Commander of the Order of the British Empire
- French Legion of Honour (Grand Officer)
- British General Service Medal
- Knight Officer of the Sacred and Military Order of Saint Maurice and Saint Lazarus (Italy)
- War Cross for Military Valor (Italy)
- Silver Messina Earthquake Medal 1908 (Italy)
- Serbian Order of Saint Sava (Grand Officer)
- Serbian Order of the White Eagle (Commander)
- Cross of the Serbian Red Cross
- Serbian Merit Silver Medal
- War Medal (Serbia)
- Russian Order of Saint Anne
- Montenegrin Order of Danilo (Commander)
- Montenegrin Gold Medal for Merit
- Order of the Crown of Romania (Officer)
- 1st class Second Grade Vytis Cross (Lithuania)
- War Cross (Greece)
- War Cross (Czechoslovakia)
- Order of Saint Agatha (San Marino)

== Promotions ==
First lieutenant, Officer Reserve Corps: September 16, 1916
First lieutenant, Regular Army: April 4, 1917
Captain, Regular Army: March 28, 1918
Major, Regular Army: May 1, 1918
Lieutenant colonel, temporary: October 1, 1918
Major, Regular Army: June 9, 1920 (Reverted to permanent rank.)
Lieutenant colonel, Regular Army: January 14, 1937
Colonel, Army of the United States: June 26, 1941
Colonel, Regular Army: January 14, 1943
Brigadier general, Army of the United States: January 27, 1944
Colonel, Regular Army: February 1, 1946 (Reverted to permanent rank.)
Brigadier general, Regular Army: April 27, 1948
Major general, Army of the United States: April 27, 1948
Major general, Retired List: December 31, 1951

Source: U.S. Army Register, 1948.

== Affiliations ==
- President General of the Society of the Cincinnati
- President of the Association of Military Surgeons
- Fellow of the American Academy of Arts and Sciences
- Fellow of the American College of Surgeons
- Fellow of the Royal Geographical Society of Great Britain
- Member of the Dante Society of Italy
