= South–Cockrell–Hargis family =

Southern American family

The South–Cockrell–Hargis family is a family of politicians from the southern United States who achieved prominence in state and national offices, representing Virginia, Kentucky, Missouri, Mississippi and Texas.

- John South, member of the Kentucky legislature 1793–1804.
  - Samuel South 1767–1832, Kentucky State Senator, Kentucky State Representative, Kentucky Treasurer 1818–1824. Son of John South.
    - Jere South 1805–1880, Kentucky State Representative 1840, Kentucky State Senator 1843. Son of Samuel South.
      - Thomas Perrin Cardwell 1829–1915, Kentucky State Representative 1864–1865, Kentucky State Senator 1865–1869. Son-in-law of Jere South. Brother of Kentucky State Representative Isaac Newton Cardwell.
        - South Trimble 1864–1946, Kentucky State Representative, U.S. Representative from Kentucky 1901–1907, candidate for Lieutenant Governor of Kentucky. Grandson of Jere South.
        - Jerry Curtis South 1867–1930, member of the Arkansas legislature 1891–1901. Grandson of Jere South.
        - John Glover South 1873–1940, U.S. Minister to Panama 1921–1930, U.S. Minister to Portugal 1930–1933. Grandson of Jere South.
        - Christine Bradley South 1879–1957, delegate to the Republican National Convention: 1920, 1928, and 1932, member of the Republican National Committee 1937. Daughter of U.S. Senator William O. Bradley, niece of Kentucky State Senator Thomas Zantzinger Morrow, and first cousin of Kentucky Governor Edwin P. Morrow. Wife of John Glover South.
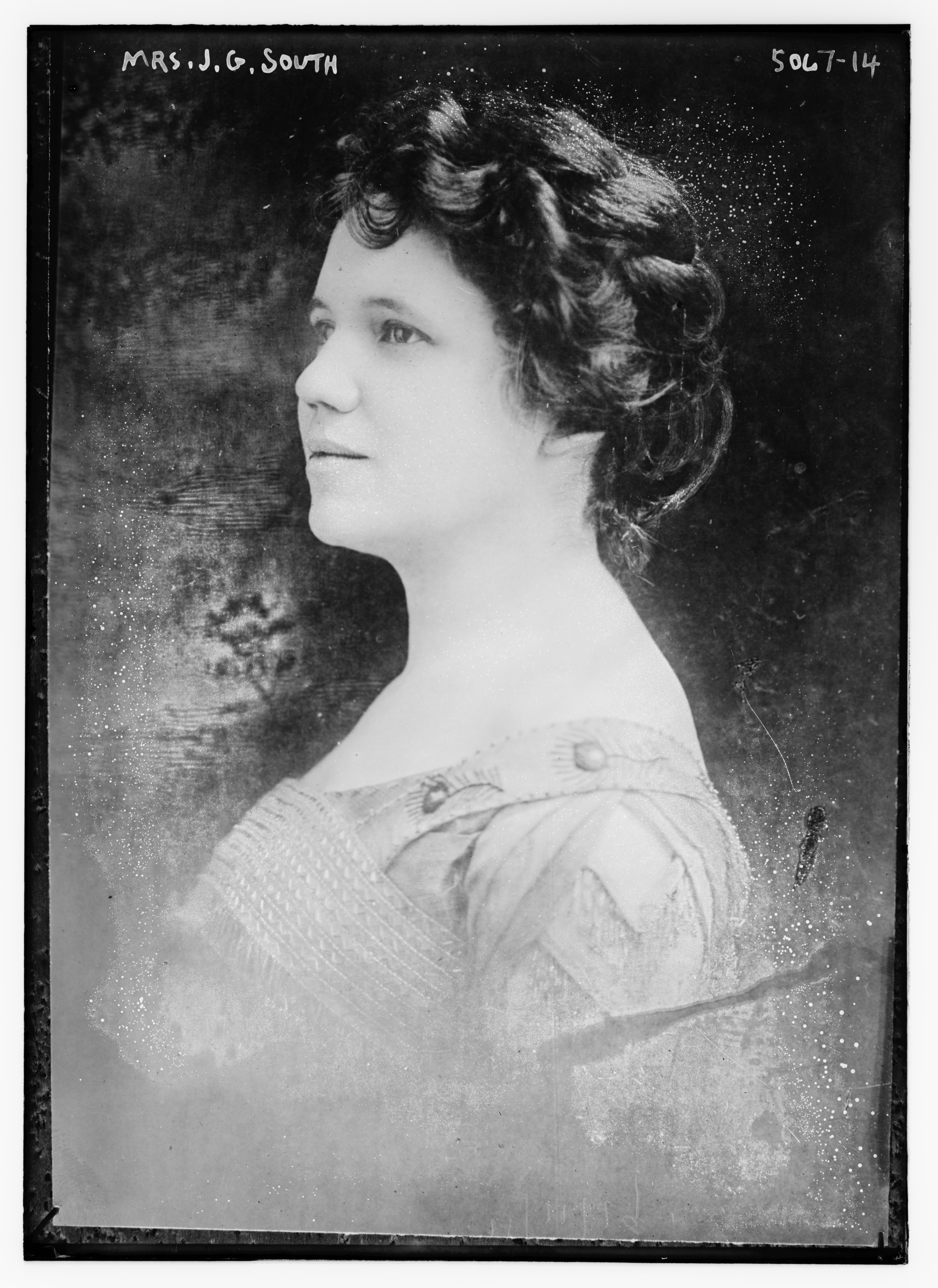
          Christine Bradley South
        - Enoch Edgar Hume 1844–1911, Kentucky State Representative 1875–1877, Mayor of Frankfort, Kentucky 1905–1906. Grandson-in-law Jere South.
          - South Strong 1880–1939, delegate to the Kentucky Constitutional Convention 1912, delegate to the Democratic National Convention 1912. Great-grandson of Jere South.
          - Eleanor Hume Offutt 1894–1955, delegate to the Democratic National Convention 1936 1940. Daughter of E. Edgar Hume.
- Simon Cockrell 1745–1835, Virginia House Delegate 1791-1793 1798–1800. Grandfather-in-law of Jere South.
  - Moses Cockrell, Virginia House Delegate 1799–1800. Son of Simon Cockrell, grandfather-in-law of Jere South.
    - Elisha Logan Cockrell 1823–1876, Kentucky State Representative 1847. Grandson of Simon Cockrell.
    - Harrison Cockrell 1826–1876, Presidential Elector for Kentucky 1868, Kentucky State Senator 1869–1873, candidate for U.S. House of Representatives from Kentucky 1874. Grandson of Simon Cockrell.
    - Jeremiah V. Cockrell 1832–1915, U.S. Representative from Texas 1893–1897. Grandson of Simon Cockrell.
    - Francis Cockrell 1834–1915, U.S. Senator from Missouri 1875–1905. Grandson of Simon Cockrell.
    - James K. Vardaman (1861–1930), Mississippi State Representative 1890–1896, Governor of Mississippi 1904–1908, U.S. Senator from Mississippi 1913–1919. Cousin of U.S. Senator Hernando D. Money. Grandnephew of Simon Cockrell.
- John Louis Hargis 1802–1886, delegate to the Kentucky Constitutional Convention 1849, Kentucky State Representative 1855–1857.
  - Thomas F. Hargis 1842–1903, Kentucky State Senator 1871–1875. Son of John Louis Hargis, son-in-law of Jerry Curtis South.
  - John Seldon Hargis 1820–1892, Kentucky State Senator 1892. Nephew of John Louis Hargis.
  - Archibald Calloway Cope 1828–1907, member of the Kentucky legislature 1887–1888. Son-in-law of John Louis Hargis.
    - Alexander Hamilton Hargis 1859–1943, Kentucky State Senator 1892. Son of John Seldon Hargis.
    - James H. Hargis 1862–1908, member of the Kentucky Democratic Central Committee 1899–1907. Son of John Seldon Hargis.

== See also ==
- List of United States political families
