= Jere South =

American politician (1805–1880)

Member of the Kentucky Senate
- In office 1843–1847

Member of the Kentucky House of Representatives
- In office 1840

Personal details
- Born: July 10, 1805 Madison County, Kentucky, U.S.
- Died: April 15, 1880 (aged 74) Frankfort, Kentucky, U.S.
- Resting place: Frankfort Cemetery, Frankfort, Kentucky, U.S.
- Relations: South-Cockrell-Hargis family
- Parent: Samuel South

Jeremiah Weldon South (July 10, 1805 – April 15, 1880), also known as Jere South, was an American politician from the Commonwealth of Kentucky. He served in both chambers of the Kentucky General Assembly as a member of the Kentucky House of Representatives in 1840, and a member of the Kentucky Senate from 1843 to 1847. He was a member of the South–Cockrell–Hargis family.

South was born in Madison County, Kentucky, on July 10, 1805, to Samuel South, who served as Kentucky State Treasurer from 1818 to 1824. He died on April 15, 1880, on the floor of the Kentucky Senate, aged 74. He was buried at Frankfort Cemetery in Frankfort, Kentucky.
