= Muriel Craigie =

Scottish suffragist and wartime volunteer organiser

Muriel Craigie OBE
- Born: Catherine Muriel Craigie; 1889
- Died: 9 December 1971 (aged 81–82); Stracathro Hospital
- Other name: C. Muriel Craigie
- Education: Montrose Academy
- Organization(s): Women's Army Auxiliary Corps Scottish Women's Hospitals for Foreign Service Townswomen's Guild and Women's Voluntary Service for Civil Defence
- Known for: leadership in Women's Army Auxiliary Corps., Scottish Women's Hospitals for Foreign Service Townswomen's Guild, Women's Voluntary Service and supporting women's suffrage and better education
- Awards: OBE 1919, Serbian Red Cross Medal

Muriel Craigie, OBE (1889–1971) was a leading Scottish suffragist, honoured by two nations as a major volunteer organiser in both World Wars, and a 'noted educationist' during local authority education reforms.

She was headquarters' organiser for the World War I Scottish Women's Hospitals for Foreign Service first Serbian unit, for which she was awarded the Serbian Red Cross medal. For her role as Scotland's Recruiting Controller for the Women's Army Auxiliary Corps, she was awarded the Order of the British Empire in 1919.

In World War II, she led the Women's Voluntary Services for Civil Defence in Montrose and district, and organised comfort supplies for the troops and civil evacuation of children and other vulnerable people from the industrial cities. She was the only woman on the 7-person Invasion Committee.

Craigie became the British National Townswomen's Guild vice-president (1951-1954), and in total served 25 years, from launching Montrose branch to leading the North East Scotland Federation.

Craigie was the first woman to convene any Angus county education sub-committee. Before and after the Education Act, she served education policy work for twenty years as a 'noted educationist.'

== Personal life ==
Born Catherine Muriel Craigie in 1889, known as Muriel; her father William Craigie was the town firemaster, and she had a sister Rhoda Craigie. They lived at 5 Erskine Street, Montrose.

Her father had worked with his brother in a wood merchants and joinery business before that, but when he died in 1936, he had served as the firemaster for 37 years; his funeral led by a fire engine, with Muriel and her sister as pall-bearers, supported by fire crews and local dignitaries.

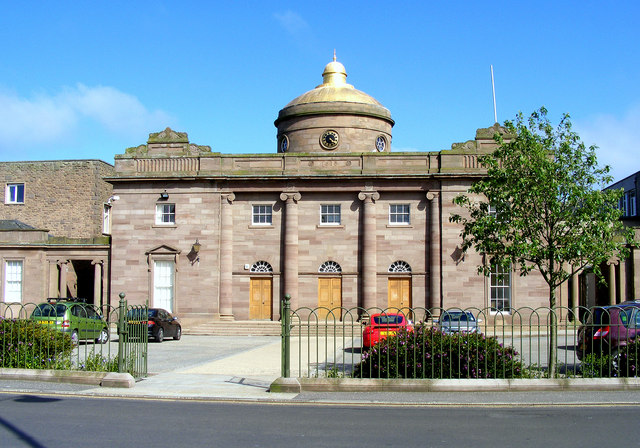
Montrose Academy

Craigie attended the Montrose Academy, where she performed well, winning class prizes in history, English and sewing, and physical drill. In later life she was to become the first woman ever to preside over the Academy's prize-giving ceremony. In sports, she won an open handicap children's competition medal at golf (Luiskill medal), and played for the Academy Girls hockey team. She attended and successfully studied scripture at the St. George's United Free Church.

As an adult, she lived with her sister at the same address, and attended St. George's and Trinity Church; she served in leadership roles during both World Wars, and in the community of Montrose, for the causes of women's suffrage, relief to troops and children's wellbeing and county education committees and took on national roles in the Townswomen's Guild.

She died at Stracathro Hospital, on 9 December 1971, aged 82

== Suffrage activism ==
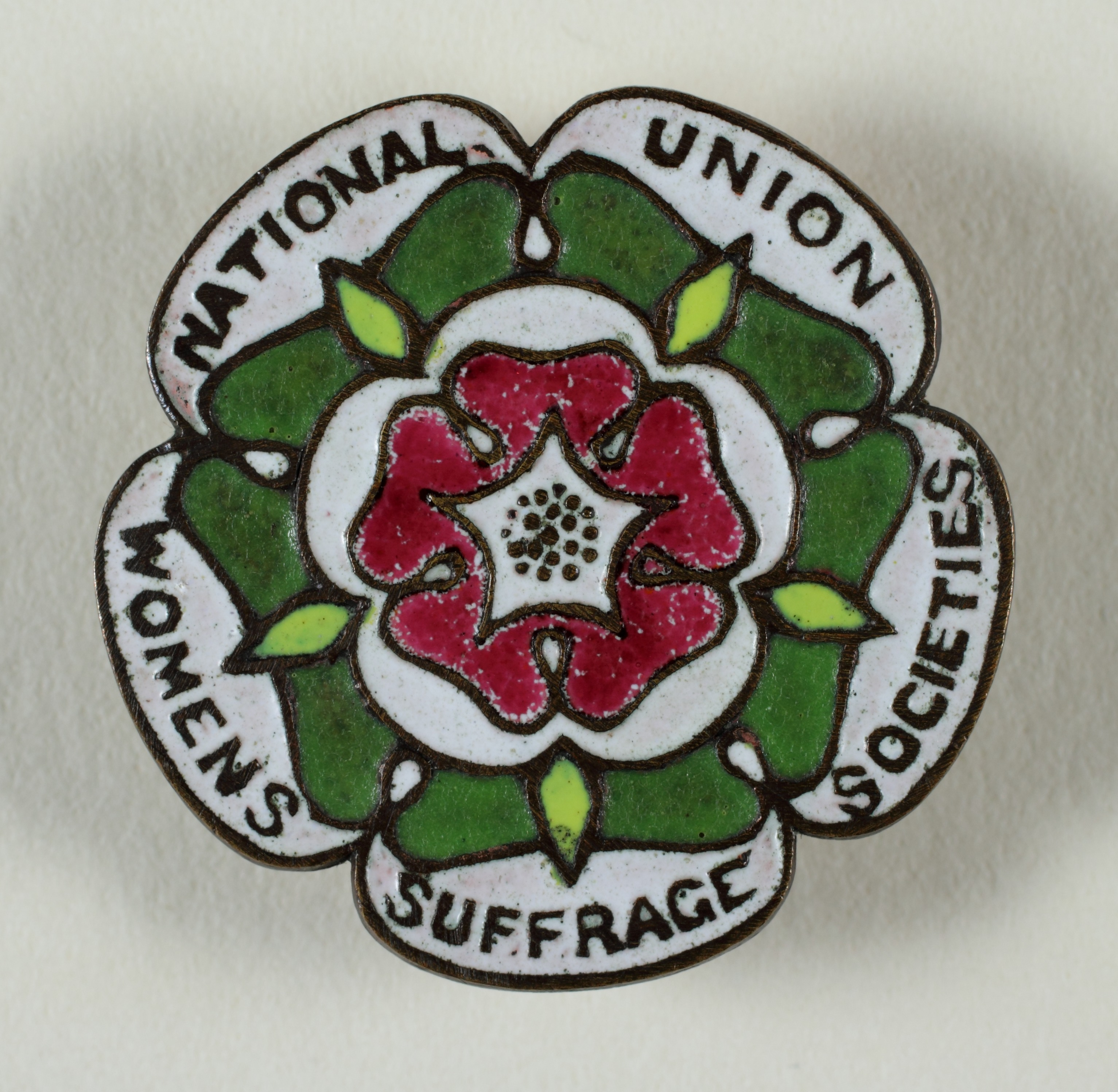
NUWSS logo 1908-1918

By 1913, Craigie was presiding over or speaking at meetings of the National Union of Women's Suffrage Societies (NUWSS) and organising events in different parts of the country. In March 1913, speaking to the Women's Cooperative Guild in Dundee, in May, with Alice Compton at Frenchie and Falkland. And she had co-organised the NUWSS 'Franchise Fortnight' speaker tour for leaders including Muriel Matters, Louisa Lumsden, Margaret Aldersley, Geraldine Cooke, Margaret Robertson and Bessie MacNicol across at least twelve towns in the kingdom of Fife (sometimes hosting three or more events in a day), and in presenting a variety of settings. For example, Craigie and the other speakers addressed a lively farming community at Cupar Cross from the back of a vehicle at the busy merkat (market) cross; hosted a ladies' 'at home' for a religious discussion; and a talk for female workers, in the open-air at the linoleum and mill factory's gates. The details of the tour and the arguments made for the franchise were reported in the press, who noted that the NUWSS were non-militant, non-party. Reports described how the women conducted themselves and dealt with hecklers; one farmer bought a copy of the NUWSS's The Common Cause newspaper, saying 'What we dinna' ken, we'll read aboot', which led to all copies selling out and an offer of a repeat meeting on the following week's market day. The Provost of Ladybank said he supported their cause in his introduction, and in most cases, the audience voted unanimously in favour of Craigie's proposal to ask the Prime Minister to introduce a Bill for women's enfranchisement. Miss Matters' contribution and handling questions were welcomed as she was from Australia, where women already were parliamentary voters, without experiencing women wanting to 'usurp the men', as she put it.

In October that year, Craigie toured West Lothian with suffragist leaders who visited seven towns, and had found supportive audiences. Craigie spoke at Bathgate with Miss Foggo, where she explained that when the women's movement began they put the case that 'criminals and lunatics' were denied the vote and women, but over time workers such as agricultural labourers were included in the franchise, so why should women continue to be excluded, as the working women also paid their taxes, but had no right to vote for parliamentarians who decided these taxes. She also spoke about the social 'ills' that a female perspective could press representatives to address, and she argued for fair wages. Her arguments persuaded a 'quite a number of the men' present to sign up in favour of the women's vote. At Blackburn, where Foggo and Craigie based the society headquarters temporarily, they collected 'Friends of Women's Suffrage' signatures, sold merchandise and '24 dozen copies of the NUWSS The Common Cause' newspaper. They also held the attention of an overflow audience who had come to hear Dr. Elsie Inglis speak in favour of the vote. And In November 1913, at Whitburn, West Lothian, Craigie convened an event where speaker Alice Low addressed a large and supportive audience, explaining the legislative barriers and the case for women to have the vote.

In June 1914, Craigie was asked to speak about 'The Glasgow Demonstration' at the Edinburgh NUWSS bi-annual members only business meeting, and was again sharing the platform with Muriel Matters and Alice Low.

== Volunteering and honours in World War I ==
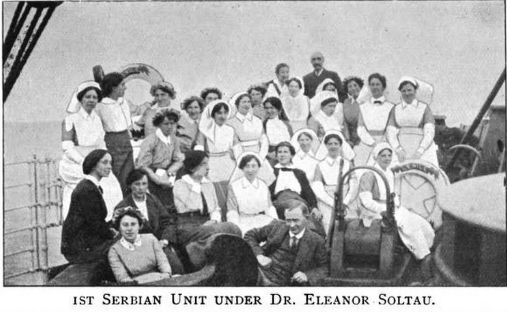
Scottish Women's Hospital - First Serbian Unit

Craigie's life took a change of direction shortly after the outbreak of World War I, through the connections between NUWSS to Dr Elsie Inglis' Scottish Women's Hospitals for Foreign Service (SWH), as she became an organiser for the SWH's first Serbian Unit.

This was the second all women medical and nursing team Dr. Inglis sent to the front. Its role was to support the Serbian government, travelling to the war zone with the British Admiralty, despite the UK's military hierarchy refusing to accept the all-women medical and nursing team. When Dr. Inglis returned briefly to Edinburgh in March 1916, Craigie was to the fore in the welcome party at the station, and presented her with red, white and blue flower bouquet, with Sarah Mair, Dr Alice Hutchison, Dr Beatrice Russell, Sir George Berry, Lady Salvesen, Miss J.H. Kemp, Mrs Wallace Williamson, Mrs Fred Salvesen, Miss Robertson of Innerleithen, Rev Mr & Mrs Robb.

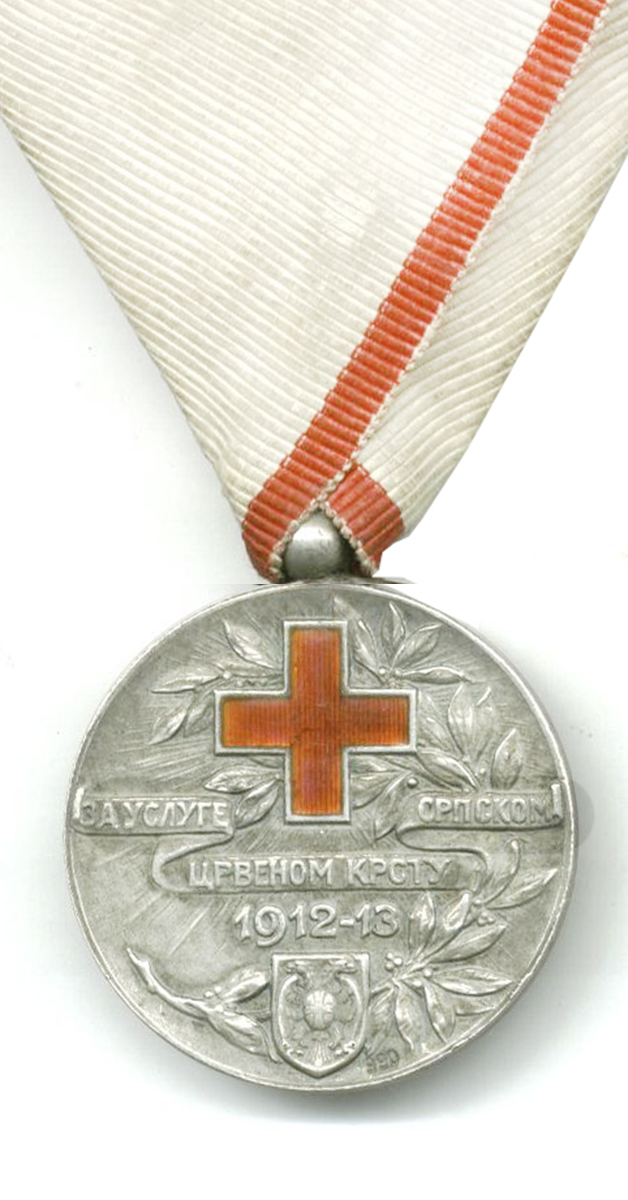
Example of Serbian Red Cross medal

Craigie served as Press and Appeals Secretary at the SWH headquarters and was awarded a medal in recognition of her service to the Serbian Red Cross, by the Crown Prince of Serbia with a letter from His Excellency M. Jovanović.

Craigie had also organised lectures via all the school boards in Scotland to mark 'Kossovo Day' (sic) on 29 June 1916, to raise the awareness of the allied nation's history in defending the cause of right, and through churches' Sunday Schools to explain the 'Christians versus Ottoman Empire' Kosovo battle history. Although these efforts were 'not primarily to raise funds' for the SWH, any donations were to be submitted to Craigie at the SWH Edinburgh HQ, for the siege relief work in Serbia. As well as 'naming' beds at the SWH hospitals from fund-raising or donations, Craigie, as the organising secretary, also acknowledged that towns such as Jedburgh raised (e.g. £13 3s 4d) from a 1917 Flag Day for SWH.

== Women's Army Auxiliary Corps. leadership ==
Craigie became the recruiting controller of the Women's Army Auxiliary Corps (WAAC) for Scotland, by September 1917, and she ensured that calls went out for cooks and domestic workers, as 'the pay is good'. She was awarded an OBE for her services to WAAC.

=== Civic activities ===
Craigie's national profile and organisational skills were put to use in peace-time politics, as the Scottish women's organiser for the break-away Liberal Party, which was supporting the 1920 coalition government, and a new Scottish National Liberal Council. The following year, she 'gave an interesting address on present day political matters' at a joint meeting of Liberal and Unionist women. She gave talks to the United Free church groups including an address on Burns, and at the British Women's Temperance Association on comparing the social and economic conditions of the day with a century ago, or on the gold standard, Manchuria, production and distribution ('A Tropical Talk').

== Townswomen's Guild leader ==
Craigie served the Townswomen's Guild (TWG) organisation 'enthusiastically' for twenty five years, initiating the Montrose branch and representing the town at regional and national federation levels. She became the vice-chairman of the National Union of Townswomen's Guilds of Great Britain (1951-1954), and was made the first honorary president of the North of Scotland Federation of Townswomen's Guilds on her official retiral.

By late 1935, when Craigie was appointed the vice-president of the Montrose Townswomen's Guild and one of two delegates for the North of Scotland Federation, the membership and attendance had grown beyond 200, then 250, needing larger venues. Craigie presided over a large and well attended arts exhibition, after the first fifteen months of the Guild, showing off the member's own embroidery and handicraft work and donated items; in the vote of thanks Craigie heard that 'Montrose is a bright spot in the Northern Federation'. She was elected president of the Montrose Guild in December 1936. In March 1937, given her war service with SWH, she presided over an event on the progress on building the Elsie Inglis Memorial Hospital and on 'medical pioneer women', including the idea of maternity units included at each hospital.

Craigie was elected as the president of the Montrose Townswomen's Guild in December 1937, and addressed a rally, at Laurencekirk, where she was welcomed by the Provost (see image), now vice-president of North East Guilds Federation Southern group (set up due to expansion to assist more local guild collaborations). She explained the broad scope of the Guilds from creative craft & arts to engaging in public affairs, and in particular in education. She reported that TWGs had won grants from the Carnegie Trust and collaborated closely with education authorities across the north-east of Scotland;. At the social evening, she launched a competition for handiwork, with each guild to nominate three pieces for overall judging, with a certificate to be given to the host guild of the winning piece. And she took a group of 50 attendees to a personal-guided tour of Edzell Castle.

Craigie was retained as branch president in 1938, as well as co-convening the finance and drama activities of the Guild, before announcing she was stepping back. Four hundred people came to the Montrose Guild's fourth birthday event. She was chosen to attend the 1939 National Council (in her Montrose and North-East Federation capacity), an event with 1,000 attendees debating the future, in Scarborough, of what had by then become a 54,000 member national women's organisation.

She stepped down properly from leading TWG in 1941 'due to pressure of other duties,' but returned for the Guild's seventh anniversary to give the 'Immortal Memory' address at their 1942 Burns supper. Craigie was also asked to give a lecture on 'The Educational Committee, Its Functions and Administration" to the Guild in October 1944.

After the war, Craigie was returned, and was President of the North-East Federation of the Townswomens Guild. By 1953, she was granted the 'signal honour' of being elected as national vice-chairman of the British National Union of Townswomen's Guilds, based in London from 1951 to 1954.

She later scripted a play for the 1953 Aberdeen Coronation Year Rally, of the TWG North East Federation drama competition, which had a covenanting theme, acted out by amateur women from Montrose showing a Conventicle, as had been led by preacher James Renwick.

In 1958, Craigie was elected as the first honorary president of the North of Scotland Federation of Townswomen's Guilds.

== Education committee roles ==
Craigie became a member of the Montrose School management committee, representing the county Education Committee, in 1937, when topics debated included statutory duties, established in 1906, for free school meals and the consideration of holiday feeding of poor children, still a political issue at the passing of the post-war Education Act, and even up to 2021.

She joined the county sub-committee on religious instruction, in 1937, with personal responsibility for Montrose schools and Hillside and Dun. Craigie was suggested as a suitable candidate for election in the Montrose municipal election of 1937, due to her 'extensive travelling' and service on the School Management Committee but although some called her 'an ideal member', she refused to stand.

In 1938, she became the first woman to preside at the Montrose Academy prize-giving. After the war, Craigie rejoined the county education committee, and later in her life became the first woman to convene the sub-committee on education for the Montrose district.

PTR Act 1937

Craigie was a member of the keep fit committee, set up under the Physical Training and Recreation Act, which made the town councils responsible for training leaders or granting contributions to capital costs from playing fields to public baths. In the debate on a major swimming pool versus a playing field investment, Craigie suggested a local survey of what is needed. In November 1938, she inaugurated the new filtration plant at the Montrose North Links School swimming bath. She became the convenor of the North Links School sub-committee and co-convenor of the Poor Children's Clothing Fund.

== Women's Voluntary Services responsibilities ==
Craigie became local co-ordinator for the Women's Voluntary Services (WVS) for Civil Defence in Montrose in 1939.

This involved organising and communicating effectively, dealing enquiries, ensuring the safety and care of the evacuees (children and teachers or responsible adults, then expectant mothers and disabled adults moved from the industrial cities, likely to be attacked, to smaller towns and rural areas considered safer), and she had to co-ordinate a large group of volunteers. WVS had undertaken a survey of suitable billeting and clothing needs were met for the children arriving. With her Townswomen's Guild teams, Craigie had organised manufacture or donation of 1,000 items of first aid supplies for the Forfar hospital, using a member's home as a Hospital Supply Depot. Craigie served on the Montrose Red Cross committee from the start of the war.

=== Co-ordinating home front and troop support ===
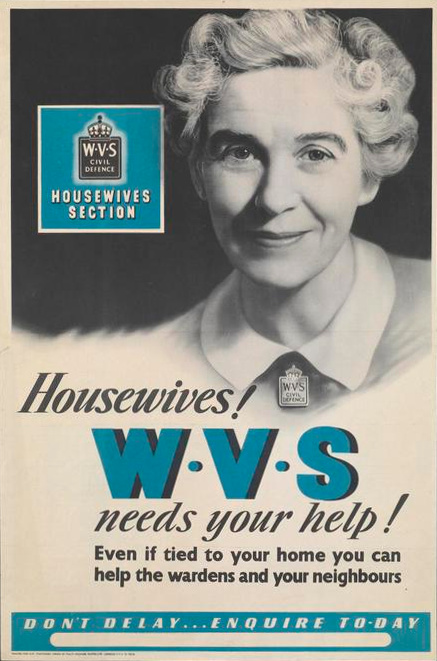
WVS Housewives poster

In 1940, she was co-ordinating the WVS depot for comforts for the troops, under the county of Angus scheme, pulling together activities of the local churches and eventually seventeen women's groups, and managing out-posts in seven country parishes. They collected in over 400 items in the first month, with wool costs met by the Black Watch Fund who saw to the distribution of completed items. An appeal was made for financial support, as it was expected that within six months, the country was going to have about three million men under arms.

In her first WVS annual report, Craigie said 600 items had then been sent via Black Watch plus sweet goods and 'three footballs for Christmas' to the British Expeditionary Force. By June 1940, over 1,300 articles had been donated from her Montrose War Comforts Depot.

At the next annual report, Craigie could report a new Mending Depot handling 17,788 bundles of laundry, two or three Rest Centres for air raid victims, staffed by the WVS volunteers and YMCA, with second-hand clothing on offer, and she had other volunteers manually writing up Ration cards (6,000 were issued). She explained that 1,114 comfort items sent out including garments, slippers, bed rests and trays, and wooden bed blocks made by senior boys at Montrose Academy. A Housewives Service started in 1940/41 to teach fire-fighting, first aid and use of gas masks to women at home. A mobile first aid post was provided with bedclothes, sandbags, hot water bottles and other equipment including over 80 splints, ready to use. Craigie thanked all the volunteers, shopkeepers and businesses who had offered support to civil defence efforts.

A formal visit by Lady Balfour and the Countess of Dalhousie with the Lord Provost was told that national organisers were aware of the WVS at Montrose and Lady Balfour praised Craigie and her volunteer teams' efforts, saying that 'they had been tested out and not found wanting'. In September 1942, Craigie began a series of lectures on the W.V.S. role in civil defence and in basic training.

Another of the wartime concerns was 'household economy' (during rationing and shortages) and thirteen local women's groups were called together after a Scottish Education authority request to consider education of (especially) poorer households to help reduce food waste and to improve healthy eating. Craigie suggested a 'broadcasting van going through the streets and giving cooking demonstrations'. Her recommendation was taken up by the Council to attract interest in local classes on cooking and on "fuel economy and 'make do and mend'".

At a W.V.S. canteen party for the troops in 1944, Craigie was able to greet attendees in both English and Polish.

=== Serving on the Invasion Committee ===
As Britain had prepared for the threat of a Nazi invasion in 1942, Craigie was the only woman on the seven-person Montrose Invasion Committee, representing the W.V.S. with the senior representatives of the Home Guard, Angus Constabulary, National Fire Service, Emergency Food Officer and two council representatives, including the Lord Provost as chair, all appointed by the area Regional Commissioner.

=== Wartime support services are wound down ===
After six years, the county W.V.S. services were wound down, with Craigie reporting that volunteers asked about coal and furniture, blankets and clothes for evacuees up to VE-Day, and a re-homing scheme for bomb-struck Stepney had delivered 2 tons of goods as well as financial support. The knitted goods were still going to naval and merchant navy personnel or European Relief projects after the cessation of hostilities, but most civil defence services were now closed. She paid tribute to the years of 'untiring and devoted services', especially to her co-ordinating committee, which she called 'the faithful twenty-five' who had served W.V.S throughout the six years of war, at 'great personal sacrifice'. Craigie thanked the responsiveness of the public authorities 'to the strange and varied demands made upon them'. A formal celebration of 'The Stand Down of the Montrose W.V.S.' also reviewed the work undertaken, and she was reported as saying that, at the start in July 1939, ' If they had all realised then what they were being asked to do, quite a number would not have joined.' She noted that the knitters and war comfort providers would continue over the next winter. She praised all the volunteers and reminded the audience of the rapid creation of the seamen's rest when the Buccaneer had run ashore; the emergency clothing service gathering 6,000 items overall; the mobile canteen providing a full three course meal from scratch in a morning; and the many home-workers creating garments for emergency needs. Craigie thanked their 'spirit of co-operation....splendid and loyal help'. Her group were also recognised in a letter from the Earl of Airlie, Lord Lieutenant of the county and key volunteers were given a card of thanks from Lady Dalhousie.

Craigie was later presented in 1946, with a cheque in recognition of her service as Montrose W.V.S. centre leader.

As well as returning to previous regional duties with the Townswomen's Guild, Craigie continued to serve beyond her initial eight years on the Angus county council county food control committee, which continued to function into the 1950s. And she joined the North Angus and Mearns constituency Liberal-Unionist Association executive council.

== First woman to convene education sub-committee ==
Craigie was voted again (in 1949) onto the Angus county council Education Committee. She gave a talk on its work to the Montrose Business and Professional Women's Club and discussed the new Education Act, which covered 3 to 18 year olds as well as 'further and adult education' within the remit of local authorities, and would, she said, have an impact on local tax as well as bringing benefits. Her talk covered nursery education needs; school transport issues; the different senior schools (three year or five year education); the school meals service (which provided 7000 to 8000 meals a day) and the challenge of full to capacity provision at 'special schools' for the deaf and blind.

She bemoaned the 'non-cooperative' parents not engaging with their children's education, despite a bursary system for poorer families. And noting that the adult or leisure elements of the Act, covering handicrafts, drama or physical drill classes with professional trainers was, she said, at risking of attracting 'cranks'. She assured her audience that 'Properly safe guarded, however, it did make a contribution to the life of the nation.' The new and increased scope of responsibilities had increased education spending by the county by £302,314 over the previous eight years, with £40,000 of this now spent on providing bursaries.

In 1953, she was elected as the only woman on the education group and became the first female convenor of the education sub-committee for the district of Montrose, when re-elected in 1955, she promised to 'keep it short and business like' in their meetings.

Craigie became the chairman of the Angus further education committee and was described as saying that there were 'too many young people squatting at the bottom of the ladder' when she awarded the first prize-giving to distinguished apprentices in the building and allied trades, at the Montrose Further Education Centre. She said in the highly competitive 'new world' or 'atomic world', the country would need 'thousands of highly-skilled technicians' and that the courses on offer could lead to a City & Guilds certificate, and for those with 'ambition and the ability' to pass the National Certificate, 'a very useful recommendation all over the English-speaking world'. The next speaker confirmed that point and linked hard work to a confidence and a willingness to take responsibility, and in the closing vote of thanks, Miss Craigie was said herself to be 'doing a useful job' in chairing two of the county education sub-committees and that she was 'an asset to Montrose'.

When she retired from the committees, after twenty years, Craigie was described as 'a noted educationist', 'a fluent speaker', and a 'most efficient chairman' and it was said that the 'town and county are in her debt for the ungrudging public service' she had given.

== Honours and awards ==
- Serbian Red Cross Medal
- Member of the Order of the British Empire (OBE)
