= T. Tileston Wells =

American lawyer and diplomat (1865–1946)

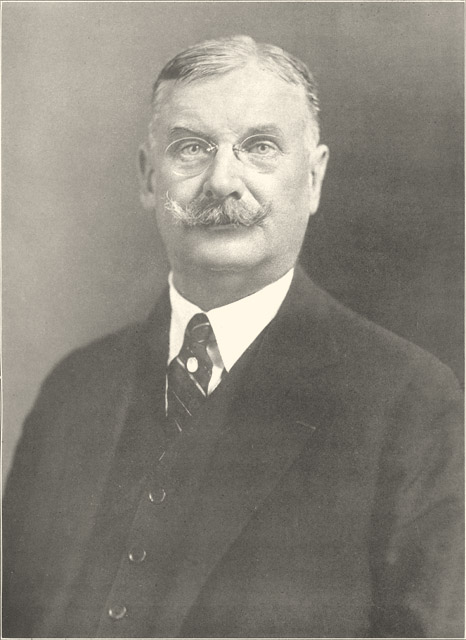
- Born: Thomas Tileston Wells; August 12, 1865; Manhattan, New York, US
- Died: April 23, 1946 (aged 80); Manhattan, New York, US
- Resting place: Christ Church, New Brunswick, New Jersey, US
- Education: Columbia Law School; Harvard University; Columbia University
- Occupations: Consul General of Romania; Attorney
- Employer(s): T. Tileston Wells; Wells & Moran; Wells, Moran & Derby; Wood, Wells, Moran & Derby; Lexow, MacKellar, Guy & Wells; Lexow, MacKellar & Wells; Lexow & Wells
- Board member of: Roumanian Relief Committee of America Serbian Relief Committee of America; Fédération d'Alliance Française Children's Aid Society
- Honours: Chevalier de la Légion d'Honneur Ordre des Palmes académiques Royal Order of the Redeemer; Order of St. Sava; Order of the Crown; Order of the Star; Order of the Red Cross Order of Adolphe of Nassau

Thomas Tileston Wells (September 12, 1865 – April 23, 1946) was an American attorney and the Romanian Consul General. He also was a leader in French, Serbian, and Romanian relief efforts during World War I. He was highly decorated by European countries, including receiving a Chevalier de la Légion d'Honneur from France.

== Early life ==
Wells was the child of Grace (née Tileston) and John Wells, a merchant. Wells was born at his maternal grandmother Tileston's house at 2 East 14th Street in Manhattan, New York. His paternal grandfather was a successful lawyer, Thomas L. Wells. His paternal grandmother, Julia Beach Lawrence, was the daughter of the largest landowner in New York state and an East India merchant.

After his father died in 1871 when Wells was six years old, the family lived at Sommariva, his mother's home in New Brunswick, New Jersey that overlooked the Raritan River. However, they also spent several years abroad, including living in Romania. When they returned to America and Wells enrolled in college, they also had a house at 56 West 17th Street in New York City.

While he was in law school, the family moved to 12 West 19th Street which was better suited for his sisters' coming out party. In 1890, his mother purchased a house at 52 East 25th Street where Wells lived until his marriage. The family also spent summers in Bar Harbor on Mount Desert Island in Maine.

His primary education was mostly abroad but he also attended St. Mark's School in Southborough, Massachusetts. He attended Columbia University from 1883 to 1887. While at Columbia, he was a member of the Fraternity of Delta Psi (St. Anthony Hall). He also attended Harvard University, graduating with the class of 1888. He then went to Columbia Law School, graduating with a LL.B in 1890.

== Career ==
=== Attorney ===
Wells was elected to the New York State Bar Association on December 9, 1890. He received permission to practice at the Supreme Court of the United States on April 9, 1897.

He formed a firm, Lexow & Wells with Clarence Lexow who also attended Columbia University and was a member of the New York State Senate. In 1895, they created the firm Lexow, MacKellar & Wells with George M. Mackellar. Their offices were at 19 Liberty Street in New York City. At some point, the firm expanded to become Lexow, MacKellar, Guy & Wells. Their offices were at 43 Cedar Street, New York City. Wells stayed with this firm through 1916; although Lexow died in 1910.

In 1900, Wells was a member of the Lawyers' Sound Money Campaign Club. In 1905, he was elected to serve as a director of the Aetna Indemnity Company; he was reelected for another two-year term in 1907.

Wells specialized in serving as the receiver for bankrupt cases at the United States District Court. In 1907, he was appointed to serve as the receiver for the New York Tunnel Company which was constructing the Brooklyn-Battery Tunnel under the East River from the Battery in Manhattan to Brooklyn. The newspapers reported that the Tunnel Company had 46 suits against it, totaling in excess of $100,000 ($3,583,333 in today's money). In 1913, Wells was the receiver for H.B. Hollins & Co., a New York City banking company that owed funds to J.P. Morgan and William K. Vanderbilt; its debuts were reported to be more than $4,500,000 ($133,142,202 in today's money).

In 1916, Wells formed Wells & Moran with attorney and railroad president Charles Moran Jr. From 1918 to 1927, they expanded the firm to Wood, Wells, Moran & Derby which added Chalmers Wood and James L. Derby; the latter being a recent Harvard University graduate. Their offices were at 68 William Street in Manhattan. This firm became Wells, Moran & Derby, and, later, returned to just Wells & Moran. Starting in 1937, Wells was in solo practice with offices at 25 Broadway and 1819 Broadway in New York City.

=== General Consul ===
In 1918, Romania opened a consulate at 43 Cedar Street in New York City, and Wells became its consul. On April 26, 1919, Wells was appointed General Consul for Romania in America. He remained in that position until 1938 when a Romanian replaced him. Wells provided this service to Romania without pay for nineteen years. He then served as Honorary General Consul until 1941. He also served on the executive committee of Friends of Roumania.

In 1920, Crown Prince Carol, heir to the Romanian throne, visited New York City incognito. As the Consul General, Wells was part of the reception committee. He also took the prince on a driving tour of the city.

In The New York Times in February 1926, Wells defended Romania's position regarding paying Austria and Hungary for pre-war bonds. In March of the same year, he again wrote the newspaper to provide context to reports of Romania's trial and execution of some prisoners who he claimed traitors associated with the Soviet Union which was trying to gain a foothold in Romania. In both of these instances, Wells is responding officially, as the Consul General of Romania.

In October 1926, Wells helped coordinate the New York portion of Queen Marie of Romania's royal visit to America, along with Princess Ileana and Prince Nicholas. He was also fourth in the royal procession at the ball hosted by the Friends of Roumania at the Ritz–Carlton Hotel in New York City, with some 700 guests in attendance.

In 1927, Wells again defended Romania when an article in The New York Times cited a report by the American Committee on the Rights Religious Minorities that stated religious and cultural minorities were being treated poorly in that country. Wells called the report "unfair and exaggerated," indicating that the League of Nations had already reviewed these claims. The executive secretary of the American Jewish Congress, Bernard G. Richards responded, "The grievous wrongs suffered by the Jewish citizens of Rumania [sic], to which we have repeatedly sought to call attention, are now voiced by an impartial deputation representative of various Christian denominations..." Leo Wolfson, president of the United Rumanian Jews of America, also responded, writing, "Mr. Wells is a distinguished American lawyer, but he knows about Rumania and her Jews what he has been told, or what he has been shown when he visits the country he represents."

In 1928, Wells visited Queen Marie and Iuliu Maniu, Prime Minister of Romania, while on a three-month trip to Europe. In 1938, Wells headed a group of 300 mourners for the Dowager Queen Marie at the Cathedral of St. John the Divine in Manhattan.

== World War I ==
In 1914, the Wells family went on a hiking vacation in the Swiss and Austrian Alps. At the time, his son John was eighteen, and his daughter Georgina was eleven. As they traveled from France to Austria, they were caught at the beginning of World War I, unable to use their return train tickets because the trains were commandeered to move French soldiers. When the family tried exiting Europe through Italy on August 2, 1914, Austrian officials arrested Wells as a Russian spy—threatening him with immediate execution. Fortunately, Wells had an introductory letter from William Jennings Bryan who was United States Secretary of State at the time, leading to his release. Wells said two other individuals were taken prisoner at the same time but were not released; he "did not know what became of them."

The Wells family eventually made it Venice, Italy but a bank crisis meant they were unable to access the funds that the U.S. Congress put in place to help Americans escape Europe. However, the family eventually made it to Rome and sailed on the SS Canopic from Naples, arriving in Boston, Massachusetts on September 25, 1914. Once safely in the United States, Wells wrote a memoir about their experiences and the brutality they witnessed. When his memoir was published in 2017, Kirkus Reviews wrote, "Wells' interpretations of the grand history unfolding around him are consistently insightful and prescient...This is historical scholarship at its best: rigorous, testimonial, and dramatic."

In September 1914, Wells was a member of the founding committee of the American branch of Secours National which raised funds to help Belgian and French refugees from the war. One of their appeals that ran in newspapers across the country said they were "organized in France to give immediate relief to the women, old people and children crying for bread and in need of clothing." It was also noted that the 22-person committee, including Wells, was covering all expenses, including shipping clothing to France—100% of donated money went to "these sufferers."

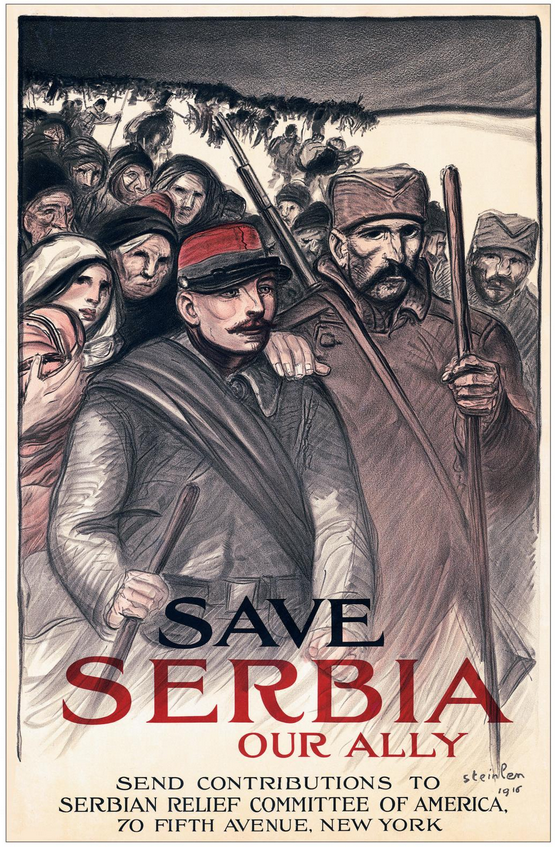
Serbian Relief Committee of America poster, 1915

Wells also chaired the Serbian Relief Committee of America from 1915 to 1918. The committee helped the hundreds of thousands of refugees who fled Serbia in the early part of the war and sent grain seed and farming implements to Serbia so starving women and children could produce food. The committee also held lectures and published materials, both to educate and to raise funds for its cause. Wells said, "Last fall, strategy obliged the Serbian army to fall back into the interior towards its arsenals, leaving Belgrade and the two most fertile districts of the country undefended. The peasants fled to the south and their buildings, granaries, and agricultural implements were destroyed... An official report gives the number of fugitives from the provinces...as 675,000 and 315,000 more from the large towns."

The Serbian Relief Committee's efforts quickly shifted from agriculture to fighting a typhus epidemic. Wells reported, "The conditions in Serbia have been bad, but are rapidly getting worse because the people, having been driven from their farms and villages by the Austrian invasion, have been herded into concentration camps where only the barest of necessities of food have been available to keep them alive, and where sanitary precautions were impossible. The result has been that typhus fever has now broken out which is likely to decimate that brave people unless medical help and nourishing food can be rapidly supplied to them."

Wells was also head of the Roumanian Relief Committee of America. This group existed to coordinate "mass meetings of protest all over the United States against the treatment of Roumanian Jews, and to raise funds for the relief of the sufferers." In December 1917, he represented the Roumanian Relief Committee at the annual convention of the American Union of Rumanian Jews and agreed to head a committee from the group so that views could be shared.

In 1917, Wells served on a fourteen-person committee that paid to print an English-French handbook for American soldiers going to France. Some 150,000 copies of the 64-page book, with a waterproof covering, were distributed to soldiers by the National Security League.

== Honors ==
- Honorary Doctorate of Literature, Rutgers University in 1912
- Chevalier de la Légion d'Honneur (France)
- Officier d'Académie, Ordre des Palmes académiques (France)
- Knight-Officer, Royal Order of the Redeemer (Greece)
- Grand Officer, Royal Order of St. Sava (Yugoslavia)
- Grand Officer, Order of the Crown (Romania)
- Grand Officer, Order of the Star (Romania)
- Officer, Order of Civil and Military Merit of Adolphe of Nassau (Luxembourg)
- Order of the Red Cross 2nd Class (Serbia)
- Grand Cross, Orthodox Order of the Holy Sepulchre
- Président Honoraire, Alliance Française of New York
- Président d'Honneur, Alliance Française de New Brunswick, New Jersey

== Personal ==
Wells married Georgina Betts of New York City on April 18, 1894. She was the daughter of Colonel and Mrs. George R. Betts. His mother gave the newlyweds a house in New Rochelle, New York on Neptune Island which they used as a summer home. They spent the winters with his aunt at 26 East 38 Street in New York City. Eventually, the couple secured their winter apartment at 42 East 25th Street in New York City. When Colonel Betts died, they moved into the Betts house at 102 Madison Avenue, living there for around eleven years. Then, they purchased a home at 52 East 76th Street in Manhattan. They had three children: John Wells, Georgina Lawrence Wells, and Lawrence Wells who died in early childhood.

In January 1900, Wells and his wife were invitees to the first levee of the winter season for the McKinley White House.

In 1898, Wells joined the board of the Five Points House of Industry in New York City; he served as the charity's president for 21 years, starting in 1914. He was also a trustee of the Children's Aid Society from 1909 to 1925. He was a treasurer and board member of the Cloyne House School, a private school for boys based on the British system, in Newport, Rhode Island.

Wells was treasurer of the Fédération d'Alliance Française from 1908 to 1925. He was president of the Alliance Française of New York from 1910 to 1914. He was also the organizer and founding president of the Alliance Française of New Brunswick, New Jersey. The New Jersey chapter was affiliated with Rutgers College and grew to 114 members in its first year. According to its website, "the mission of Alliance Française is to promote the French language and francophone cultures and to foster exchanges between French speakers and local communities."

Socially, Wells was a member of the American Yacht Club, the Calumet Club, the City Midday Club, Down Town Association of the City of New York, the Mason's Holland Lodge, the St. Anthony Club of New York, the Union Club of New York City, and the Westchester Country Club.

Wells died at his home in Manhattan, New York City at the age of 82. He was buried at Christ Episcopal Church in New Brunswick, New Jersey.

== Publications ==
- Rumania's Sacrifice: Her Past, Present, and Future. with Gogu Negulesco and Mrs. C De S Wainright. New York: The Century Co., 1918.
- Family Notes. United States: Private Printing, 1927.
- The Hugers of South Carolina. New York: M. Sloog, 1931.
- Les Huger de la Caroline du Sud; La Fayetta à Olmütz .Paris: E. Nourry, 1931.
- An Adventure in 1914: The True Story of an American Family's Journey on the Brink of WWI. Edited and expanded by Christopher Kelly. Seattle: History Invasion Press, 2016. ISBN 9780692767894.
