= Enoch Edgar Hume =

American physician and politician (1844–1911)

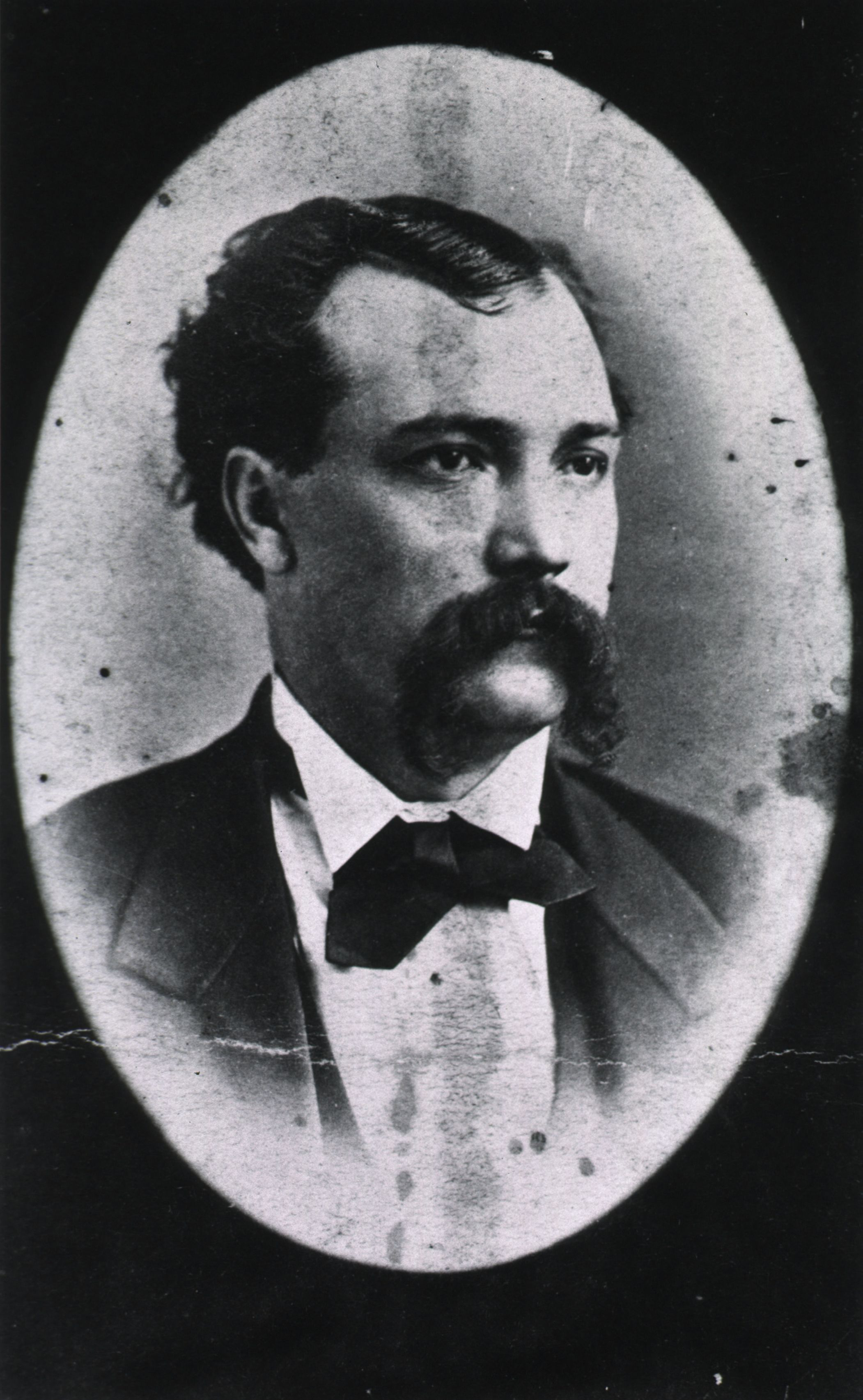

Mayor of Frankfort, Kentucky
- In office 1905–1909

Member of the Kentucky House of Representatives from Anderson County
- In office August 2, 1875 – August 6, 1877
- Preceded by: William Neal
- Succeeded by: William Neal

Personal details
- Born: March 24, 1844 Trimble County, Kentucky, U.S.
- Died: July 5, 1911 (aged 67) Frankfort, Kentucky, U.S.
- Resting place: Frankfort Cemetery; Frankfort, Kentucky, U.S.
- Spouse: Mary South (m. 1877)
- Relations: South–Cockrell–Hargis family
- Children: 1
- Education: Mount Washington Academy; University of Louisville; Bellevue Medical College

Enoch Edgar Hume (March 24, 1844 – July 5, 1911) was an American physician and politician who served as the mayor of Frankfort, Kentucky, from 1905 to 1906. He also served as a member of the Kentucky House of Representatives from 1875 to 1877.

== Early life, education, and family ==
Enoch Edgar Hume was born on his grandfathers farm in Trimble County, Kentucky. He was educated in the public schools of Louisville, Kentucky, and later attended Mount Washington Academy. At the outbreak of the American Civil War, he enlisted on the side of the Confederacy, but was found by Union authorities, and sent to Camp Chase, a military prison in Ohio. After the war, he traveled to Clearfield County, Pennsylvania, where he ran a logging camp. Upon his return to Kentucky, he began studying medicine at the University of Louisville and graduated in 1869. He married Mary South on December 19, 1877, in Frankfort, Kentucky. Together, they had one daughter and a son, Edgar Erskine Hume.

== Career ==
After graduating, Hume moved to Anderson County, Kentucky, where he practiced medicine for three years. While living in Anderson County, he was the roommate and friend of Champ Clark, a future speaker of the United States House of Representatives. He then traveled to New York for further education. He studied at Bellevue Medical College and graduated in 1875. Upon his graduation, he was employed at the Manhattan Eye, Ear and Throat Hospital. During this time, he also worked at Columbia University's medical department.

While in New York, the Democrats of Anderson County presented Hume as a candidate for election to the Kentucky House of Representatives without his knowledge. Upon his return to Kentucky, he won the election and represented Anderson County during the sessions of 1875, 1876, and 1877. At the end of his term, he declined a nomination for the Kentucky Senate.

In 1880, Hume moved to Frankfort, the capital of Kentucky, where he pursued the practice of medicine for over 30 years. During this time, he was the family physician for several of Kentucky's governors. He was the physician for governor William Goebel and one of 18 physicians who cared for him after he was shot by an assassin on January 30, 1900. Goebel died four days later.

In 1905, Hume was elected mayor of Frankfort. He served as mayor until 1909. During his time as mayor, he worked to establish new roads and sewers, and reduce the city's debt. In 1907, he called for all Kentucky teachers to meet at Mammoth Cave, and there they formed the Kentucky Educational Association. He was also a member of the board of trustees for the State Normal School for Colored Persons, and did much to improve education for African Americans in Kentucky. According to the Kentucky Historical Society's 1914 book Register of the Kentucky State Historical Society, Hume was greatly esteemed by the African Americans of Kentucky and was honored with a building named after him, along with a gold ring.

== Later life and death ==
On account of failing health, Hume retired in 1909. His brother-in-law and associate John Glover South continued the business after Hume's retirement. Even after his retirement, his health continued to deteriorate, and during his last months, he only left his home once; to go vote for his friend James B. McCreary for governor. Hume died on July 5, 1911, at his home in Frankfort, at the age of 67. He was interred at Frankfort Cemetery in Frankfort.
