= James Davidson (Kentucky politician) =

American politician

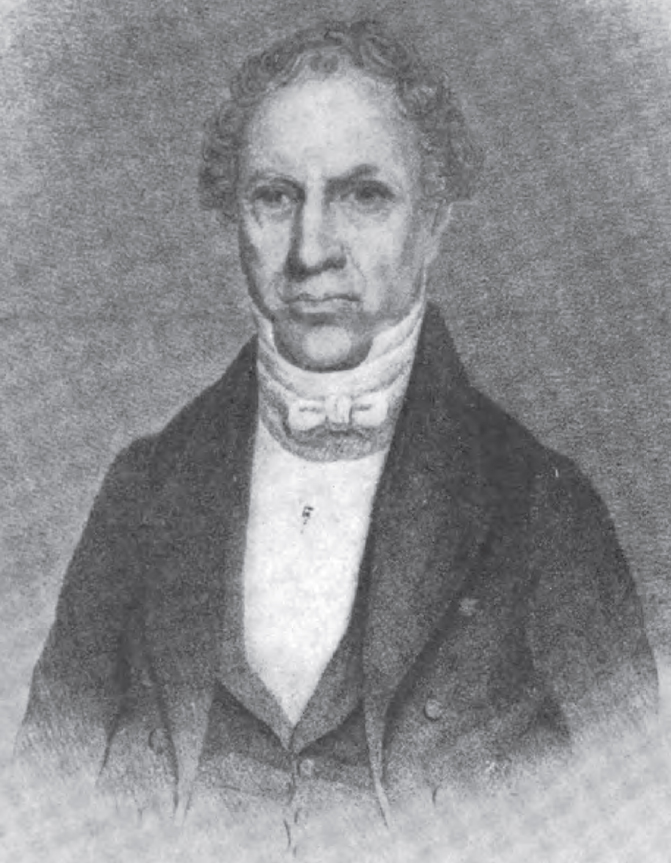

5th Kentucky State Treasurer
- In office December 9, 1825 – July 7, 1848
- Preceded by: John P. Thomas
- Succeeded by: Richard Curd Wintersmith

Personal details
- Born: Lincoln County, Kentucky
- Died: 1860
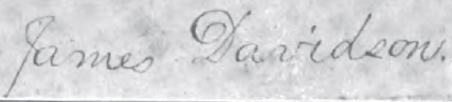
- Signature

Military service
- Branch/service: Kentucky militia
- Rank: Colonel
- Battles/wars: Battle of the Thames

James Davidson was born in Lincoln County, Kentucky. He was the son of George Davidson, a captain in the Revolutionary War. He and his twin brother, Michael, married sisters; the sisters, Lucretia and Jane Ballenger, were granddaughters of Kentucky pioneer and eventual state treasurer John Logan. James Davidson was among the first to report the presence of notorious outlaws the Harpe brothers near the city of Stanford, their first reported appearance in Kentucky.

In the War of 1812, Davidson, being commissioned a colonel, commanded a company from Garrard County in the regiment of Richard Mentor Johnson. Davidson's unit served with Johnson at the Battle of the Thames, and after the battle, Davidson claimed it was a soldier in his company – a man named John King – and not Johnson, who killed the Shawnee chief Tecumseh during the battle. Historian William B. Allen later opined, based upon interviews with both American and Shawnee soldiers who participated in the battle, that neither Johnson nor King killed Tecumseh, but another Shawnee who bore a striking resemblance to him, and that Tecumseh was killed by a random bullet.

Following his service in the war, Davidson was elected to represent Lincoln County in the Kentucky Senate. He served from 1818 to 1826. He was elected state treasurer on December 9, 1825, and served continuously until his resignation on July 7, 1848. He died in 1860.

Political offices
Preceded by Samuel South	Treasurer of Kentucky; 1825–1848	Succeeded by Richard Curd Wintersmith
