= Red Cross of Serbia =

Serbian humanitarian organisation

- Црвени крст Србије
- Official logo
- Formation: 6 February 1876; 150 years ago
- Founder: Vladan Đorđević
- Headquarters: Belgrade, Serbia
- Location: Serbia
- President: Dragan Radovanović
- Parent organization: International Federation of Red Cross and Red Crescent Societies
- Staff: 800
- Volunteers: 60,000
- Website: www.redcross.org.rs

The Red Cross of Serbia (Serbian: Црвени крст Србије, romanized: Crveni krst Srbije) is a humanitarian, non-governmental organisation that provides humanitarian aid, disaster relief and education in Serbia. It is the national affiliate of the International Federation of Red Cross and Red Crescent Societies.

It was founded on 6 February 1876 by Vladan Đorđević, a prominent Serbian physician and politician. Metropolitan Mihailo, its first president, held the office from its fledgling beginnings in 1876 until 1883. The other presidents include:

- Vladislav Vujović (1883–1886)
- Đorđe Simić (1886–1888)
- Milojko Lešjanin (1888–1896)
- Jovan Mišković (1896–1897)
- Stevan Zdravković (1897–1899)
- Dragutin Franasović (1899–1914)
- Milos Borisavljevic (1914–1921)

== Disaster response ==
One of the public authorisations given to the Red Cross of Serbia by the Government of Serbia is preparing, acting and educating people for response to disasters, armed conflicts and other emergency situations on the territory of Serbia. More than 3,000 volunteers in local branches of the Red Cross are educated for disaster response, while more than 300 of volunteers and employees were professionally trained for search and rescue in all environmental conditions. They are educated to perform specific tasks of the National disaster response teams:

- Team for Assessment and Coordination (Serbian: Тим за процену и координацију/Tim za procenu i koordinaciju (ТПК/TPK)) whose role is to assess the needs of the affected population and to coordinate the disaster response
- Rescue, evacuation and care during the floods (Serbian: Спасавање, евакуација и збрињавање у случају поплава/Spasavanje, evakuacija i zbrinjavanje u slučaju poplava (СЕП/SEP)) whole role is to participate in search and rescue and care of affected population during the floods.
- Rescue, evacuation and care in extreme winter conditions (Serbian: Спасавање, евакуација и збрињавање у екстремним зимским условима/Spasavanje, evakuacija i zbrinjavanje u ekstremnim zimskim uslovima (ЕЗУ/EZU)) whose role is to participate in search and rescue efforts during the extreme winter conditions and on high, snow-covered mountains with specialised equipment such are sledges.
- Mobile technical team (Serbian: Мобилни технички тим/Mobilni tehnički tim (МТТ/MTT) whose role is to provide technical and logistical assistance to all other teams, operate technical equipment, provide water and sanitation, and set up temporary camps.

== Awards ==
- Order of the Red Cross (Serbia)
- Red Cross Medal of Merit (Serbia)
