= Jerry Curtis South =

American lawyer and politician (1867–1930)

Member of the Arkansas General Assembly
- In office 1891–1901

Personal details
- Born: March 24, 1867 Frankfort, Kentucky, U.S.
- Died: September 24, 1930 (aged 63) Washington, District of Columbia, U.S.
- Resting place: Arlington National Cemetery; Arlington, Virginia, U.S
- Party: Democratic
- Spouse: Ellen Hargis
- Relations: South-Cockrell-Hargis family
- Children: 1

Jerry Curtis South (March 24, 1867 – September 24, 1930) was an American lawyer and politician from the U.S. state of Arkansas. He served as a member of Arkansas General Assembly from 1891 to 1901. He was a member of the prominent South–Cockrell–Hargis family. South was a member of the Democratic Party.

Born in Frankfort, Kentucky, South attended the Kentucky Military Institute, and earned a law degree from the University of Virginia in 1888. He served as a member of the United States Army in the Spanish–American War. He was a delegate from Arkansas to the Democratic National Convention in 1892, 1896, 1904, 1908, 1912, and 1916. He died on September 24, 1930, at his home in Washington, D.C., and was buried at Arlington National Cemetery.
