= Samuel South =

American politician

4th Kentucky State Treasurer
- In office 1818–1824
- Preceded by: John Pendelton Thomas
- Succeeded by: James Davidson

Personal details
- Born: 1770 Maryland
- Died: 1833 (aged 62–63) Lexington, Kentucky
- Relations: John South (Father)

Military service
- Allegiance: United States
- Branch/service: United States Army; United States Volunteers
- Years of service: 1782-1815
- Rank: Brigadier General
- Battles/wars: American Revolutionary War; War of 1812; Battle of the Thames; Battle of New Orleans

Samuel South (c. 1770 – 1833) was born circa 1770 in Maryland. He was the second son of John South. The South family moved to Boonesborough when Samuel was still young. At the time, Boonesborough was in Fayette County in the District of Kentucky, a part of the state of Virginia. John South was in command of the militia at Boonesborough.

When South was twelve years old, he and another boy of about the same age were sent by the women of Fort Boonesborough to call back the men of the fort for its defense after seeing Native Americans in the area. South and his companion traveled through the woods for two days to find the men, who were engaged in the defense of Estill's Station. When the men returned to the fort on March 21, 1782, the Indians attacked in what became known as the Battle of Little Mountain or "Estill's Defeat". South's older brother, John Jr., was killed in the battle. Following this battle, South enlisted as a private in his father's company, serving until the end of the Revolutionary War.

After Kentucky became a state in 1792, South was commissioned a captain in the state militia. In this capacity, he participated in several campaigns against the Indians. By the outbreak of the War of 1812, he had risen to colonel of the Kentucky Mounted Volunteers. He participated in both the Battle of the Thames and the Battle of New Orleans. For bravery at the Battle of New Orleans, he received a brevet to the rank of brigadier general. Years after the war, Richard Mentor Johnson called on South to verify his claim that he (Johnson) had killed the Shawnee chief Tecumseh at the Battle of the Thames.

Following the war, South was made a justice of the peace in Madison County, Kentucky. He represented the county in the Kentucky General Assembly for thirteen years, serving at various times in both houses. On one occasion, he fell just one vote short of becoming Speaker of the House, losing the position to Henry Clay. He was elected state treasurer in 1818 and served until 1824. He died at the home of his father-in-law, John Glover, in Fayette County in 1833. He was buried in the Glover family cemetery.

Political offices
Preceded by John P. Thomas	Treasurer of Kentucky; 1818–1824	Succeeded by James Davidson
