= John South (Kentucky politician) =

American politician

John South was an American politician from the Commonwealth of Kentucky. He served as a member of the Kentucky General Assembly from 1793 to 1804. He was the patriarch of the South political family.
