= Red Cross Medal of Merit =

Serbian Red Cross medal

Red Cross Medal of Merit (Serbia)
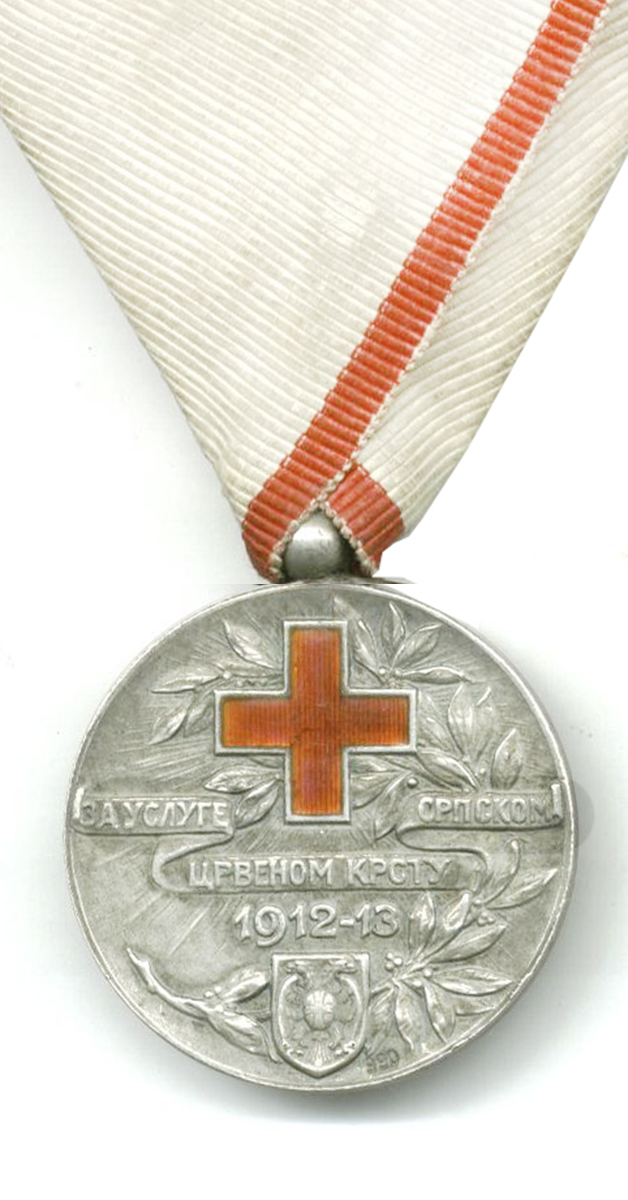
- Red Cross Silver Medal of Merit (Serbia)
- Type: Military decoration
- Awarded for: Exceptional merit and services rendered to the Serbian Red Cross in time of war or peace.
- Presented by: the Serbian Red Cross
- Eligibility: Members of the Military Medical Services
- Established: 1912
- Ribbon of the medal

Precedence
- Next (higher): Order of the Red Cross

The Red Cross Medal of Merit was awarded to men and women, Serbian and foreign nationals, in two classes. Decorations of the Serbian Red Cross Society had the rank of state decorations.

== History and criteria ==
The Red Cross Medal of Merit was instituted in 1912, it was awarded by the Board of the Red Cross Society, with the approval of the Chancellor of Royal Orders, for exceptional merit and services rendered to the Serbian Red Cross in time of war or peace, and for care and assistance to the sick and wounded, philanthropy and personal merit. The Medal of Merit was awarded in two Classes (Silver Medal and Bronze Medal). It was first awarded in 1912 during the First Bakan War, In 1933 the awarding of the Bronze Medal ceased and a senior Class of Gold Medal was introduced to replace it.

== Appearance ==
The front features the emblem of the Red Cross with the inscription "за услуге српском црвеном крсту" (For Services to the Serbian Red Cross) and the coat of arms of Serbia.

The reverse of the medal displayed the Maid of Kosovo motive, offering water to the dying knight Pavle Orlović, based on the painting by the Serbian artist Uroš Predić, the scene is based on the central figure of the respective poem, part of the Kosovo cycle in the Serbian epic poetry.

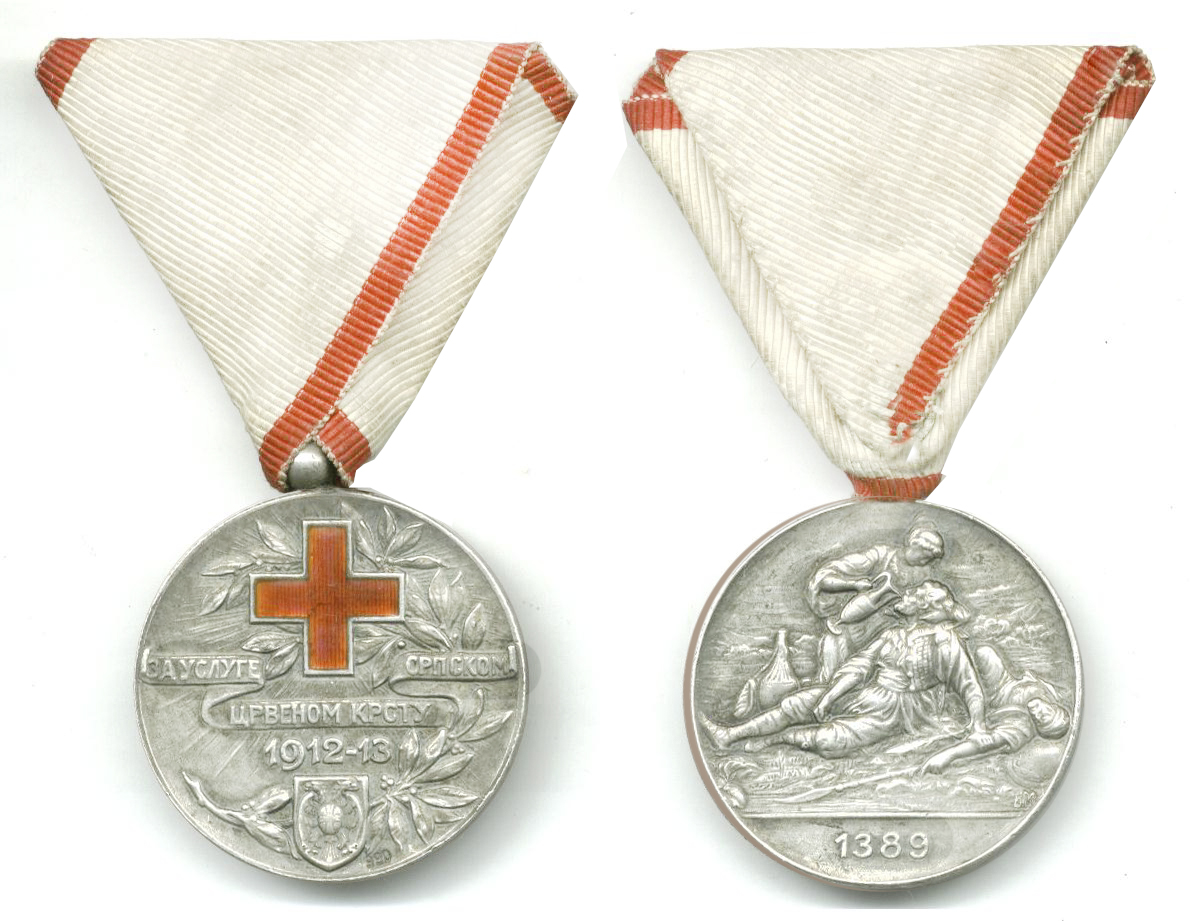
obverse and reverse

== Notable recipients ==
- Mabel St Clair Stobart
- Edgar Erskine Hume

== See also ==
- Order of the Red Cross (Serbia)
