= Order of the Red Cross (Serbia) =

Serbian Red Cross Order

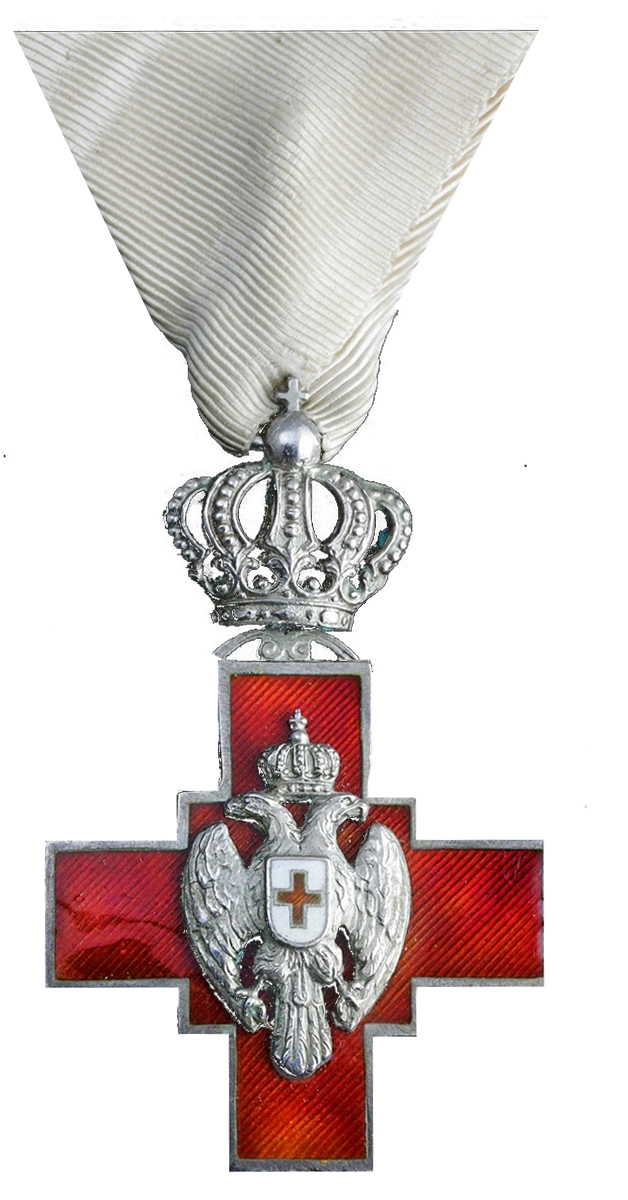
- Order of the Red Cross (Kingdom of Serbia)
- Type: Military decoration
- Awarded for: Exceptional care of the wounded and sick during war time
- Presented by: the Serbian Red Cross
- Eligibility: Members of the Military Medical Services
- Established: 1877 (Principality); 1882 (Kingdom)
- Ribbon of the order

Precedence
- Next (higher): 1914–1918 Commemorative war medal
- Next (lower): Red Cross Gold Medal of Merit

The Order of the Red Cross (Serbian: Орден Црвеног крста) was a military decoration of the Kingdom of Serbia, Kingdom of Serbs, Croats and Slovenes and Kingdom of Yugoslavia. Established in 1876 and first awarded in 1877 by the Serbian Red Cross Society, it was awarded for exceptional care of the wounded and sick during war time. Decorations of the Serbian Red Cross Society had the rank of state decorations.

== History and criteria ==
The Order of the Red Cross or Cross of the Serbian Red Cross Society (Serbian: Крст Друштва Српског Црвеног крста) was founded in 1877, it was first awarded during the Wars of Independence against the Ottomans Empire (1876-1878).

The Cross was awarded by the Board of the Red Cross Society, with the approval of the Chancellor of Royal Orders, for exceptional merit and services rendered to the Serbian Red Cross in time of war or peace, and for care and assistance to the sick and wounded, philanthropy and personal merit. The Order of the Red Cross was founded in a single Class.

After 1918 and the Proclamation of the Kingdom of Serbs, Croats and Slovenes, the Cross of the Serbian Red Cross Society became known as the Order of the Red Cross.

== Appearance ==
=== Principality of Serbia ===
The decoration was a cross-shaped silver breast badge with red enamel on both sides; the front features the coat of arms of the Principality of Serbia and a crown with a metal loop at the top for attaching the ribbon. The reverse features the inscription: “1876”, date of the establishment of the Red Cross of Serbia.

The Cross was worn suspended from a tricolor ribbon

=== Kingdom of Serbia ===
The appearance of the Cross was modified after the Proclamation of the Kingdom of Serbia in 1882, replacing the coat of arms of the Principality of Serbia with the coat of arms of the Kingdom of Serbia, it featured a crown with a metal loop at the top to attach the ribbon. The reverse had the same inscription as the first version: “1876”.

The Cross was worn suspended from a white ribbon when awarded for services during peacetime and white with red stripes on the edge for services during wartime.

== Recipients ==
- During the Serbo-Bulgarian 1885-86 war 477: (284 to foreigners).
- During the First and Second Balkan war as well as the First World War (up until 1921): 3135 (1807 to foreigners).
- From 1922 to 1936: 674 (145 to foreigners).

== Images ==
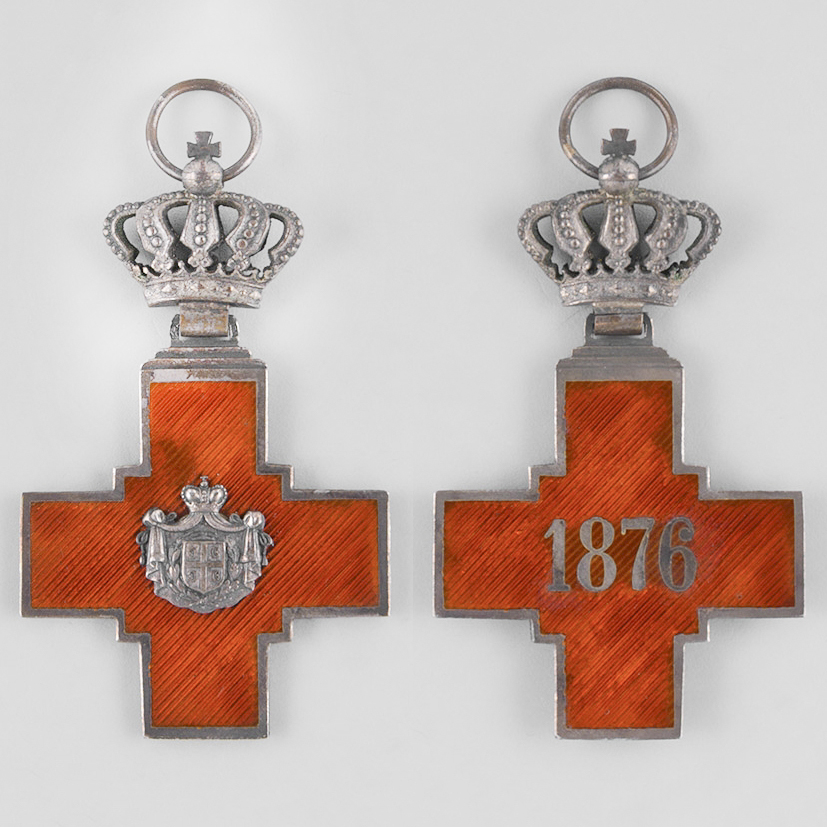
Order of the Red Cross, Principality of Serbia

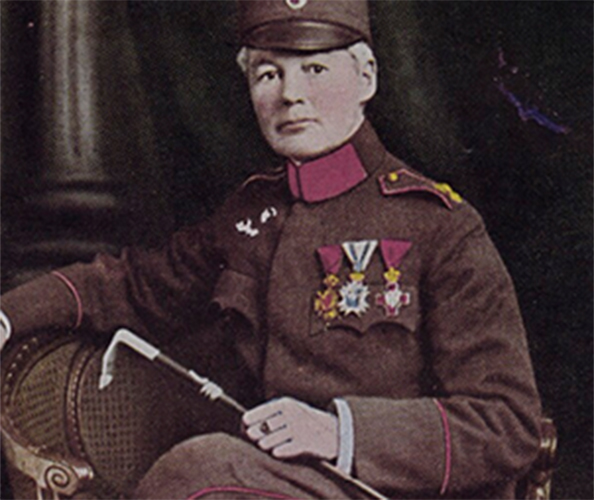
Flora Sandes, wearing the Order of the Red Cross (third from left)

== See also ==
- Red Cross Medal of Merit (Serbia)
