= Hazel King =

Australian historian

Alice Hazel Kelso King, known as Hazel King AM, (18 October 1908 – 3 December 1997) was an Australian historian who published widely and was employed as a lecturer at the University of Sydney between 1960 and 1974.

She is best remembered for her scholarship on Australian women Elizabeth Macarthur and Olive Kelso King.

== Early life and studies ==
King was born in Sydney and was the daughter of wealthy businessman George Eccles Kelso King and his second wife Alicia Martha née Kirk; she was also sister of Olive Kelso King and niece of geologist Georgina King. She spent much of her early live in the eastern suburbs of Sydney where she was first educated at home, by a governess, and then at the Ascham School.

After completing high school King attended what is now the Sydney Conservatorium of Music where she studied music and then spent much of the 1930s performing as a vocal recitalist in Egypt and Europe.

By 1943 she had returned to Australia and, following her father's death, became a carer for her mother. She learned typing and shorthand and took on work assisting medical practitioners.

After World War II King, with her family commitments lower, completed a Bachelor of Arts (1953) and then Master of Arts (1956) at the University of Sydney. She was 40 years old and able to study alongside many other mature aged students, including returned service personnel, because of the Commonwealth Reconstruction Training Scheme. She studied towards her masters part-time and became a research assistant to Marjorie Jacobs and, together, they reorganised and classified archival material at the Mitchell Library. Ultimately her masters thesis was on police organisation and administration in the early period of New South Wales.

Her mother died in 1956 and this enabled King to attend St Hugh's College (Oxford) in the United Kingdom. There she completed her Doctor of Philosophy in 1960 with a thesis on Richard Bourke who had been the Governor of NSW between 1831 and 1837.

== Academic and publishing career ==
King returned to Australia with her PhD and became a lecturer at the University of Sydney and she taught early modern European history until her retirement in 1974; she was made a senior lecturer in 1966. She was a well respected and dedicated teacher and known for her meticulous research skills and use of original sources. Both of the skills were taught to her by Jacobs.

As the child of 'colonists of standing' King was an empiricist who, according to historian BH Fletcher had a "natural affinity with members of the establishment".

In 1954, during her studies, King had joined the Royal Australian Historical Society and, through them, was the editor of the Journal of the Royal Australian Historical Society between 1964 and 1991. In 1974 she was elected a fellow and, between 1982 and 1984, also served as its first female president. She was also involved in Zonta, an organisation aimed at assisting women in professional occupations.

During her academic career and after her retirement King published a number of books including:

- Richard Bourke (1971)
- Elizabeth Macarthur and her world (1980)
- One Woman at War: the Letters of Olive King, 1915–1920 (1986)
- Colonial Expatriates: Edward and John Macarthur, junior (1989)
- Zonta in the Antipodes: a Short History of Zonta International District XVI (1989)

Her work of Elizabeth Macarthur is considered by many to be of particular value as she was a little known figure before King's research and not considered to be the 'leading figure' she is now. King's publication of this research also showed a shift in focus as her interest on the role of women in Australian history increased and she followed this by publishing the letters of her sister Olive Kelso King.

She also contributed numerous biographies, including that of her father and sister, to the Australian Dictionary of Biography.

== Death and legacy ==
King died on 3 December 1997 at Randwick.

Historian Anna Clark does not consider King to be a revolutionary figure in the writing of Australian history, although Clark does recognise her for the creation of foundational groundwork for writing about Australia's colonial past.

== Collections ==
King's papers, including those of her father, are held at the State Library of New South Wales.

There is also a collection of biographic cuttings on King at the National Library of Australia.
