= Australian Book Auction Records =

Australian Book Auction Records was a print based biennial publication, which recorded auction prices of Australasian books – usually rare, old and special copies.

It was compiled by Margaret Joan Woodhouse in the 1960s and in the 1980s by Mrs Jill Burdon. The final in the series was produced by Fiona Kells in 2006.

Such systems of recording book auction records have been mainly superseded by online records of prices and sales.
