= Gilligaloola =

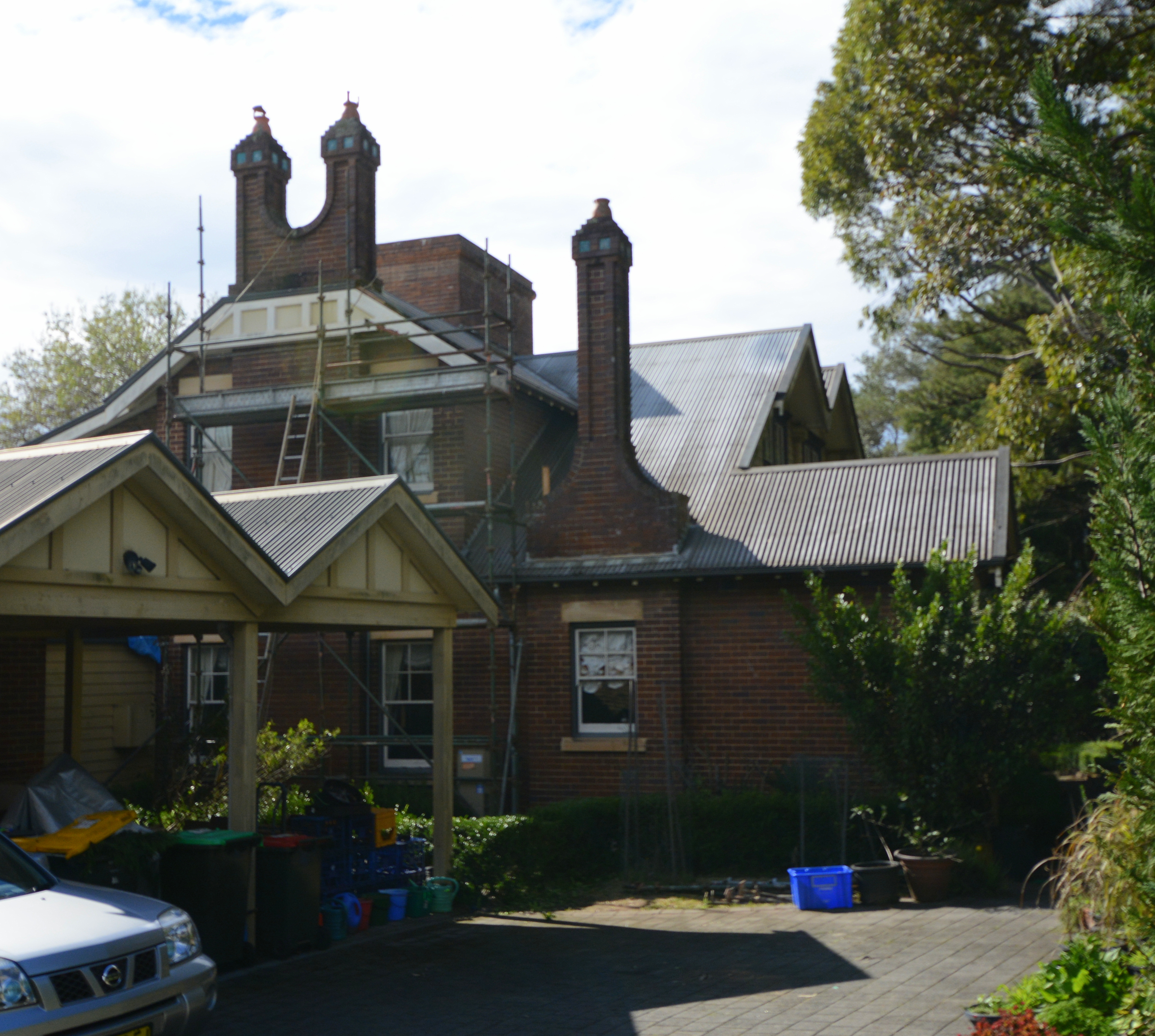
- Gilligaloola, pictured in July 2016.

- Location within Sydney Location within Australia
- 33°43′24″S 151°06′00″E
- Location: 82-84 Pennant Hills Road, Normanhurst, Hornsby Shire, New South Wales, Australia

History
- Built: 1893
- Built for: Norman Selfe

Site notes
- Architect: Norman Selfe (involvement in design)

New South Wales Heritage Register
- Official name: Gilligaloola
- Type: State heritage (built)
- Designated: 2 April 1999
- Reference no.: 271
- Type: House
- Category: Residential buildings (private)

Gilligaloola is a heritage-listed residence located at 82-84 Pennant Hills Road, Normanhurst, New South Wales, a suburb of Sydney, Australia. It was designed by Norman Selfe who was involved in the design, and built in 1893. It was added to the New South Wales State Heritage Register on 2 April 1999.

== History ==
Gilligaloola was constructed on 14 acres and planted with Italian gardens and orchards. It was built for Norman Selfe, a prominent civil engineer, after whom the suburb Normanhurst takes its name.

The architect and builder of the house is unknown, but the design and character of certain details appear to suggest that Selfe was himself involved. The following obituary taken from the 16 October 1911 edition of The Sydney Morning Herald described the significant contribution that Selfe made at the turn of the century:

"BRIDGE BUILDER. DEATH OF NORMAN SELFE. A DISTINGUISHED CAREER. A pioneer bridge builder, a public spirited citizen and an engineer who played no unimportant part in the building up and remodelling of Sydney died yesterday in the person of Mr. Norman Selfe.

The deceased gentleman was one of the best known civil engineers in Australia. Born on December 3, 1839 at Kingston on Thames he had just passed the allotted three score years and ten. Yet up to the last he retained the fullest use of all his faculties, and only last week gave a detailed account of the events which led to the proposed bridge or tunnel connection with North Sydney and explained minutely the design of his bridge which was selected by the Advisory Board from competitors from all over the world.

Educated in England for the engineering profession, Mr Selfe arrived in Sydney during the January of 1855 and was at once articled to the eminent engineering firm of which the late Sir Peter Nicol Russell was the head. After serving his time at the various mechanical branches-both for wood and metal working and also in the drawing office - he became their chief draftsman. For several years afterwards, until the partnership was dissolved he was the responsible officer of this firm for the design of hundreds of engineering works carried out, many of them under contract for the NSW Government.

He was afterwards the superintending engineer to two kerosene companies designed and carried out the mining plant, with the mountain railway and incline at Hartley Vale; as well as the works at Waterloo and the North Shore. Then under engagement with the Gas Company he erected the new head station and designed several of the prominent buildings still standing. Mr Selfe gave up his engagement with the Gas Company to accept the position of chief draftsman and scientific engineer to Mort's Dock and Engineering Company at Balmain. This position he held for a number of years until by the kind co-operation of the late Thomas Sutcliffe Mort, an industrialist, he commenced private practice. Mr Selfe visited 70 cities in Europe and the United States and made himself acquainted by personal observation with great engineering works in two hemispheres.

Many years since he was elected a full member of the English Institution of Civil Engineers, and later a member of both the Mechanical Engineers' and Naval Architects Institutions; he has also been president of both the local engineering associations. In recognition of a work on engineering, published in Chicago, he was made honorary member of an American association.

During the course of his extended career Mr Selfe has designed the hulls, machinery or both, for over 40 steamers including the Australian torpedo vessels. He was the first to introduce the compound engine to local boats, both paddle and screw; and designed the first ferry boat with screw at both ends now so common in Port Jackson. Included among his works are numbers of mills and manufactories, country water works, the original high level pumping plant at Crown Street and the supplementary engines at Botany, for the Sydney supply. He designed the first ice machines made in the colony and is the author of work on the subject. He first introduced lifts or elevators into New South Wales designed some scores of them including the 40 ton lifts still working. He patented a new system of wool pressing which revolutionised the business by increasing the capacity four fold and has carried out number of hydraulic and electric light installations in the city. He also designed all the apparatus by which trains on the New South Wales railways were first lighted by gas.

Nearly all the deep sea wharfs at the north end of the city of Sydnev have been reconstructed by Mr Selfe to accommodate modern vessels on entirely now lines introduced by him and with piles of unprecedented size and weight. Here, also the first solid quay wall of concrete in the harbour was built by him 25 years ago. All this is now the property of the State.

The first school for technical instruction in New South Wales was initiated by Mr Selfe at the School of Arts in 1865; he was afterwards successively a member of the committee of the Working Men's College and of the Board of Technical Education. For over three years he was the chairman of the latter body until its work was absorbed by the Department of Public Instruction in 1889.

Mr Selfe always took a keen, active interest as a citizen in all that concerns the improvement of Sydney and its port, quite apart from his professional practice. When it was proposed in 1873 to construct iron wharfs in Sydney Cove, suitable then only for the berthing of small sailing vessels, suggested to the Government that provision should rather be made there for mail steamers and he was then requested to prepare plans for his scheme. He did this and sat forth a scheme for building wharf walls under water and ultimately all the leading features he advocated were adopted in the work carried out.

Mr. Selfe for over twenty years was a strenuous advocate of a circular city railway that should connect up the eastern, western, and northern suburbs of the city with the marine suburbs of the harbour, and stations adjacent to the ferries; also the construction of a rational head station, accessible on all sides to the tram and vehicle traffic. The resumption and remodelling of the "Rocks" and old burying grounds for city improvement were shown on his plans, printed in 1887. There are other improvements, the result of his proposals and although he spent many hundreds of pounds on the preparation of such plans and prepared evidence without charge for two Royal commissions and two NSW Public Works Committees dealing with the city railway and the North Shore bridge, he rendered them freely.

Later on he was the successful competitor for the North Shore bridge and his design was recommended by the Government Advisory Board and will soon be considered by the Public Works Committee. He was one of the best-known figures in the city, and his death removes one who had come closely in contact with the leading public men in the State for over half a century."

— Death notice, The Sydney Morning Herald, 16 October 1911.

In November 1981, community representations were made to the Heritage Branch, raising concerns for the future of Gilligaloola. At the time, there was a proposal to subdivide the grounds of approximately one hectare into five separate lots. Subdivision plans showed lot boundaries particularly close to Gilligaloola and the grounds reputedly contained predominantly intact stylistic and horticultural elements.

The Heritage Council of New South Wales considered the matter at its 27 November 1981 meeting and recommended the Minister making of an Interim Heritage Order. An Interim Heritage Order was gazetted on 8 January 1982 over the five lots. On 16 December 1983, the Interim Heritage Order over the five lots was revoked and a Permanent Conservation Order placed over Lot 1 DP 262809 on 16 December 1983. Gilligaloola was transferred to the State Heritage Register on 2 April 1999.

== Description ==
Site and garden

Remnant garden to Norman Selfe's prominent federation house, formerly on a property of c.5 hectares (12 acres) on the ridge line. Gilligaloola's mature trees are a prominent local landmark.

A majestic Norfolk Island pine (Araucaria heterophylla) over 25-metre (82 ft) high is a prominent landmark of the area and along Pennant Hills Road probably dates from c. 1890.

The garden also conserves a fine weeping cedar to 13 metres (43 ft) high from c. 1940s and a line of olives on the north boundary to 7 metres (23 ft) from c. 1960s (?) and a tall palm in the rear garden.

A modern brick fence is not sympathetic. In the front garden of No 30 Frazer Road is a mature 13-metre (43 ft) high stone pine (Pinus pinea) from c. 1930s and two camphor laurels (Cinnamommum camphora) to 14m from c. 1950-60 which were probably originally part of the Gilligaloola garden.

Buildings

Gilligaloola consists of two buildings:

The first and original portion is a timber framed two storey farmhouse built in timber studwork with timber shiplap. It has timber floors and is built on brick piers. The second being a two-storey brick residence was added to the original portion in 1893. The two-storey brick house has picturesque verandahs to the north, east and west elevations and a large tower. The upper story is timber framed and decoratively shingles and lath and plaster lined. The front section of the roof is ripple iron. The house is finely detailed throughout with five panelled doors and baronial style marble fireplaces. Remarkable Arts and Crafts chimneys and quality decorative woodwork complement the house.

=== Modifications and dates ===
- 1991 – funding assistance provided for renewing guttering, downpipes, roof carpentry, repainting external areas and reline and refloor back verandah and rejoint areas of brickwork.
- September 1992 – approval given for construction of garage on northern corner of property.

== Heritage listing ==
As at 16 April 2013, Gilligaloola was of State heritage significance as the family home of Norman Selfe, the 19th century engineer and innovator, after which the suburb of Normanhurst was named. Constructed in 1893, Gilligaloola is an imposing two storey house with fine Art Nouvea detailing and has outstanding architectural character. The detailing suggests the Selfe was involved with its design.

Gilligaloola was listed on the New South Wales State Heritage Register on 2 April 1999.

== See also ==
- Australian residential architectural styles
