= Carol Liston =

Australian historian

Carol Ann Liston AO is an Australian historian and academic researcher who specialises in the history of colonial New South Wales from 1788 to 1860. She is associate professor of history at Western Sydney University, in the School of Humanities and Communication Arts.

Liston has a BA (1973), and a PhD (1980) from the University of Sydney.

In addition to her academic commitments Liston has been president of the Royal Australian Historical Society (RAHS) on three occasions, from 1988 to 1992, in 2002 and from 2014 to 2018. She was subsequently senior vice president and executive member of the RAHS. She has been a councillor of the RAHS since 1983. She is also a member of the Professional Historians Association NSW & ACT.

In her role of president of the RAHS and on behalf of the Hawkesbury Historical Society, Liston gave evidence at the Inquiry into the Windsor Bridge Replacement Project in April 2018.

Liston is also president of the board of the Biographical Database of Australia (BDA), a genealogical project which is transcribing, indexing and uploading biographical records of Aboriginal people, convicts and free settlers. In July 2018 the online database had nearly 1.6 million records and more are added all the time.

== Awards and recognition ==
In 2016 Liston received the Annual History Citation from the History Council of NSW in recognition of her lifelong contributions to history and heritage, including to community and local history organisations.

Liston was made an Officer of the Order of Australia (AO) in the 2017 Australia Day Honours for "distinguished service to the preservation and documentation of Australian history and heritage, to professional societies, and to education as a teacher and mentor".

Her contribution to the Royal Australian Historical Society has been recognised with the award of fellow.

== Works ==
- Birmingham, Judy; Liston, Carol (1976), Old Sydney Burial Ground 1974, Australian Society for Historical Archaeology, ISBN 978-0-909797-05-8
- Liston, Carol (1981), Minchinbury: An Historical Investigation, New South Wales Dept. of Environment and Planning
- Liston, Carol (1988), Sarah Wentworth, Mistress of Vaucluse, Historic Houses Trust of New South Wales, ISBN 978-0-949753-37-3
- Liston, Carol (1988), Campbelltown, The Bicentennial History, Allen & Unwin, ISBN 978-0-04-324015-1
- Liston, Carol (1988), The First Fifty Years: AMEV Finance Limited, AMEV Finance, ISBN 978-0-7316-4605-0
- Jack, R. Ian (Robert Ian); Liston, Carol; Elen, Judith (1991), From Frogmore Farm to Werrington Park: A History of the Warrington Site, University of Western Sydney, Produced by the Public Relations Branch, University of Western Sydney, Nepean, for the University of Western Sydney, ISBN 978-1-86341-052-6
- Liston, Carol (1993), Glen Alpine, Campbelltown: The Home of the Reddall Family, Campbelltown and Airds Historical Society Inc, ISBN 978-0-9591729-9-7
- Ashley, Geoff; Liston, Carol; Gojak, Denis (1994), An Outdoor Museum: Historic Places in the NSW National Parks & Wildlife Service Estate, NSW National Parks & Wildlife Service, ISBN 978-0-7305-7355-5
- Liston, Carol (2009), Pictorial History: Liverpool & District, Kingsclear Books, ISBN 978-0-908272-98-3
