= Margaret Woodhouse =

Australian (1927–1990) bookseller

Margaret Joan Woodhouse
- Born: Margaret Joan Barwell; 18 August 1927; Waverley, New South Wales
- Died: 12 July 1990 (aged 62); Gordon, New South Wales
- Occupation: librarian
- Known for: bookseller and compiler
- Spouse: Frank Lewis Woodhouse

Margaret Joan Woodhouse (18 August 1927 – 12 July 1990) was an Australian librarian and bookseller. Her business focused on second-hand and antiquarian books with Australian and Pacific subjects. She published five editions of the Australian Book Auction Records.

== Life ==
Woodhouse was born in 1927 in Waverley. Her parents Agnes Gertrude (born Sargent) and Albert Edward Barwell were both English immigrants. She was educated at Mount St Marys College and Convent and her career was decided when she became an assistant at the State Library of New South Wales. She studied further and became a qualified librarian. She resigned in 1959 following her marriage the year before to another librarian.

In 1962 she bought an existing company and its core business became second-hand bookselling. In 1964 Woodhouse moved her bookselling business into History House in Young Street in Sydney. This was the home of the Royal Australian Historical Society. Her business focused on antiquarian books with Australian and Pacific subjects History House had been obtained by The society's first premises, History House, opened at 8 Young Street, Sydney, in 1941. The home was arranged by the bibliophile President, Sir John Alexander Ferguson who was one of her customers. Other members and customers were the bibliophiles Geoffrey Ingleton and Walter Stone.

Between 1971 and 1979 she published five editions of "Australian Book Auction Records" which recorded the prices paid for books at auctions.

The society moved to new History House at 133 Macquarie Street in 1971 and Woodhouse's bookshop moved too and stayed until 1983. After that the business moved to locations close to her home.

== Death and legacy ==
Woodhouse died in 1990 in Gordon. Her book of auction records were updated and reissued in the 1980s by Jill Burdon. The final in the series was produced by Fiona Kells in 2006. Her library of over 500 books was auctioned by Christies in the year after she died.
