= Royal Australian Historical Society =

Society focused on Australian history

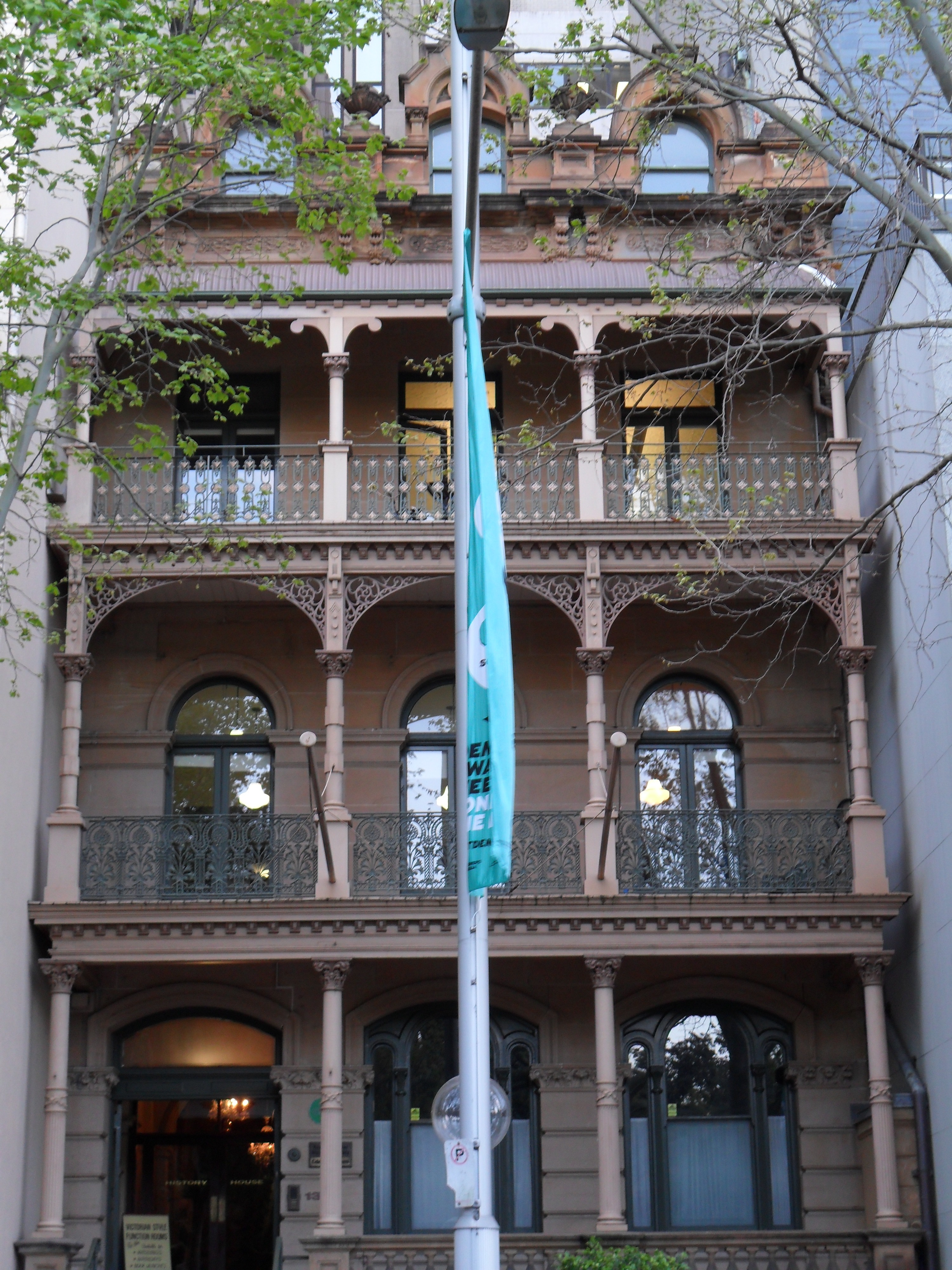
- History House at 133 Macquarie
- Founded: 1901
- Founder: Andrew Houison; Founding President
- Type: Historical society; incorporated company limited by guarantee
- VAT ID no.: ABN 91 000 027 654
- Registration no.: ACN 000 027 654
- Location: History House, 133 Macquarie Street, Sydney, Australia
- Region served: Australia
- Website: www.rahs.org.au
- Formerly called: Australian Historical Society

Journal of the Royal Australian Historical Society
- Discipline: History
- Language: English

Publication details
- Former names: Journal and Proceedings, Australian Historical Society, Journal and Proceedings, Royal Australian Historical Society
- History: 1901–present
- Publisher: Royal Australian Historical Society (Australia)
- Frequency: Biannual

Standard abbreviations
- ISO 4: J. R. Aust. Hist. Soc.

Indexing
- ISSN: 0035-8762
- LCCN: 77640195
- OCLC no.: 241448762

Links
- Journal homepage

History: Magazine of the Royal Australian Historical Society
- Categories: History
- Frequency: Quarterly
- Publisher: Royal Australian Historical Society
- First issue: 1988
- Country: Australia
- Website: www.rahs.org.au/publications/history-magazine/
- ISSN: 1031-9476
- OCLC: 19453778

The Royal Australian Historical Society, formerly Australian Historical Society, is a voluntary organisation founded in Sydney, Australia in 1901 with Andrew Houison as founding president. Its goals are to encourage the study of and interest in Australian history. It has a membership throughout Australia and many of its activities and facilities are funded by contributions from its members and benefactors.

The society is a constituent member of the Federation of Australian Historical Societies.

It publishes the biannual academic journal Journal of the Royal Australian Historical Society (JRAHS), which commenced as The Australian Historical Society Journal and Proceedings in 1901, which is the oldest historical journal in Australia, and a quarterly magazine called History: Magazine of the Royal Australian Historical Society.

== Purpose ==
The goals of the society are:

- to encourage the study of Australian history and the preservation of Australian heritage
- to promote the compilation of authentic records relating to Australia
- to acquire, either by purchase, donation or otherwise, and preserve for the use of the society books, manuscripts, newspapers, prints, pictures and all such objects and materials (in any media) as may be considered by the Council to have a bearing on Australian history, and to establish, form, furnish and maintain a library
- to promote interchange of information among members of the Society by lectures, readings, discussions, exhibitions of historical significance, tours, excursions and other appropriate means
- to print, publish (in any media) and circulate such journals, periodicals, books and other literary or other undertakings as may seem conducive to any of the objects of the society

== History ==
A public meeting in Sydney Town Hall on 30 October 1900 resulted in a resolution that an "Australian Historical Society" would be formed, in order to collect and preserve records, prints, photographs, books and other material relating to the history of Australia. The inaugural meeting of the Australian Historical Society on 15 March 1901 was attended by about ten people. The first president was Andrew Houison, and the first patron David Scott Mitchell (founder of the Mitchell Library).

Membership grew, and in 1918, the Society was granted the right to use the prefix "Royal".

The society's first premises, History House, opened at 8 Young Street, Sydney, in 1941. The home was arranged by the bibliophile President, Sir John Alexander Ferguson. In 1964 Margaret Joan Woodhouse moved her bookselling business into the building. The business focussed on second-hand and antiquarian books with Australian and Pacific subjects.

A. G. L. Shaw served on the Council of the RAHS during the 1950s and 1960s. Young Street remained the society's home until the move to the new (and current) History House at 133 Macquarie Street in 1971. The bookshop also moved to Macquarie Street and stayed until 1983.

== Activities ==
The society undertakes a range of activities including lectures and workshops, functions, walks, talks, and visits on a wide variety of topics in Australian history. It holds an annual conference which addresses current historical issues in local history and heritage. The society also has a research library with an extensive collection of pictorial and text resources on all aspects of the history of New South Wales. In addition it administers grant schemes on behalf of the New South Wales government for the promotion of heritage and the writing and publication of local history.

== Publications ==
The Society's journal is the oldest historical journal in Australia.

The Sydney Morning Herald was an active supporter of the Society, and in December 1901 urged that the Society publish a journal, so that the work of the society could reach a wider audience. However, this was not taken up until March 1906, when the Journal and Proceedings, "Volume 1 1901 Part 1", was first published in March 1906 (Note: with a 2nd edition in 1910) with the standardised library title of "Journal and proceedings (Australian Historical Society)". (Note: Note: The publication dates in the early years are a bit confusing, e.g. "Part 12, 1905–6" is dated December 1908 (see here; "Volume 2 1906 Part 1" is dated March 1909 (see here; but by 1915 the dates appear to be in sync (see here).) The first issue included a paper by Alfred Lee entitled "The Landing of Governor Phillip in Port Jackson". Volume 1 consisted of 12 parts which were published quarterly. Improvements in design and the addition of illustrations were introduced in Volumes II and IV (1917), and at the same time the editors announced a shift in editorial direction. Until then the journal had been publishing papers presented at the Society in the past, but from this point it was intended to publish more about the proceedings of the Society. This eventuated in the form of reports of excursions, answers to enquiries, and discussions about past published papers.

Between 1918 and 1964, after the society had adopted the "Royal" prefix, its standardised title became "Journal and proceedings / Royal Australian Historical Society". A. G. L. Shaw was editor of the journal from 1954 to 1964, the first professionally trained historian to edit it.

From the March issue of Volume 51 in 1965, the journal changed radically, increasing its size to about 400 pages, issued in four parts. At the same time it changed its name to Journal of the Royal Australian Historical Society (JRAHS). The journal was published quarterly until 1992, and since then has been published biannually. The peer-reviewed, biannual academic journal containing original, previously unpublished scholarly articles and book reviews and images.

Past issues under their respective titles (1901–June 1918 and 1918–1964) are available online as scanned copies, and the Journal is available as an electronic resource via Informit since 2012. An index of all journals between 1901 and 1985 exists on microform. The JRAHS has a Green Open Access policy, meaning that authors deposit a free copy of an electronic document online in order to provide open access to it. Its ISO 4 abbreviation is J. R. Aust. Hist. Soc..

The society also publishes the quarterly magazine, History, subtitled Magazine of the Royal Australian Historical Society. This grew from the society's newsletter, which began in March 1962 as a monthly supplement to the Journal and Proceedings. Its magazine format and name commenced in October 1988.

During the COVID-19 pandemic in Australia, the June editions of both publications were made temporarily available to the general public online.

== Presidents ==
The following persons have been president of the society:

- 2025–present Carol Ann Liston
- 2022–2025 Iain Malcolm Stuart
- 2021–2022 Carol Ann Liston
- 2018–2021 Christine Isabel Yeats
- 2014–2018 Carol Ann Liston
- 2012–2014 Anne-Maree Harriet Cox Whitaker
- 2011–2012 David Sulman Carment
- 2003–2011 Robert Ian Jack
- 2002 Carol Ann Liston
- 1999–2001 Ruth Meredith Frappell
- 1993–1998 Rosemary Diane Annable
- 1988–1992 Carol Ann Liston
- 1987 Robert Charles Lewis Irving
- 1985–1986 John Michael Bennett
- 1982–1984 Alice Hazel Kelso King
- 1977–1981 Kenneth John Cable
- 1970–1976 Rae Else-Mitchell
- 1963–1969 Allan Ernest Bax
- 1961–1962 Harold Arthur MacLeod Morgan
- 1959–1960 Alexander Hugh Chisholm
- 1954–1958 Charles Herbert Currey
- 1953 Karl Reginald Cramp
- 1950–1952 James Keith Solling Houison
- 1948–1949 George Mackaness
- 1945–1947 Guy Drayson Blaxland
- 1942–1944 Alfred Ernest Stephen
- 1940–1941 John Alexander Ferguson
- 1937–1939 Karl Reginald Cramp
- 1934–1936 George Henry Abbott
- 1931–1933 Owen Esmond Friend
- 1930 Harold Francis Joseph Norrie
- 1928–1929 Karl Reginald Cramp
- 1926–1927 James Henry Watson
- 1923–1925 Aubrey Halloran
- 1922 John Alexander Ferguson
- 1921 Karl Reginald Cramp
- 1920 Reginald James Black
- 1919 Stephen Henry Smith
- 1918 Hugh Wright
- 1917 William Albert Braylesford Greaves
- 1916 Walter Scott Campbell
- 1915 Charles Trimby Burfitt
- 1914 Charles Henry Bertie
- 1912–1913 Frank Walker
- 1911 James Dalgarno
- 1910 William Henry Hazell Yarrington
- 1909 James Henry Watson
- 1908 Andrew Houison
- 1907 Joseph Henry Maiden
- 1906 William James Günther
- 1905 Joseph Henry Maiden
- 1904 Arthur Ashworth Aspinall
- 1903 William Henry Hazell Yarrington
- 1902 Norman Selfe
- 1901 Andrew Houison
