= Olive Kelso King =

Australian adventurer and WWI ambulance driver (1885–1958)

Olive May Kelso King
- Olive Kelso King from a 1920 newspaper
- Born: June 30, 1885; Sydney, Australia
- Died: November 1, 1958 (aged 73); Melbourne, Australia
- Occupations: Ambulance driver; volunteer; aircraft examiner
- Years active: 1914-1944
- Employer(s): Scottish Women's Hospitals; Serbian Army; Girl Guides Australia; de Havilland Aircraft
- Known for: Work in Serbia during and after World War I
- Awards: Silver Medal for Bravery; Gold Medal for Zealous Conduct; Samaritan Cross; Order of St. Sava; Silver Fish Award

Olive May Kelso King (30 June 1885 – 1 November 1958) was an Australian adventurer and mountain climber. During World War I she drove ambulances for the Scottish Women's Hospitals and later the Serbian Army. In the final stages of the war she raised money and set up mobile canteens to help feed the Serbian people. In all, she was awarded four medals by the Serbian government for her work during the war. After World War I, King held a senior volunteer position with Girl Guides Australia. During World War II, she worked as an examiner at the Havilland Aircraft factory.

== Early life ==
Born in Sydney, Australia, Olive King was the daughter of Sir George Kelso King and his wife Irene Isabella. She was educated at home and at Sydney Church of England Girls Grammar School.. She also attended Kambala Girls' School, and after her mother died when she was 15, her father sent her to study in Germany and Switzerland, where she became fluent in French and German. She led an adventurous life that included climbing Mexico's second-highest peak Mount Popocatepetl and descending into its crater with several male companions.

== World War I ==
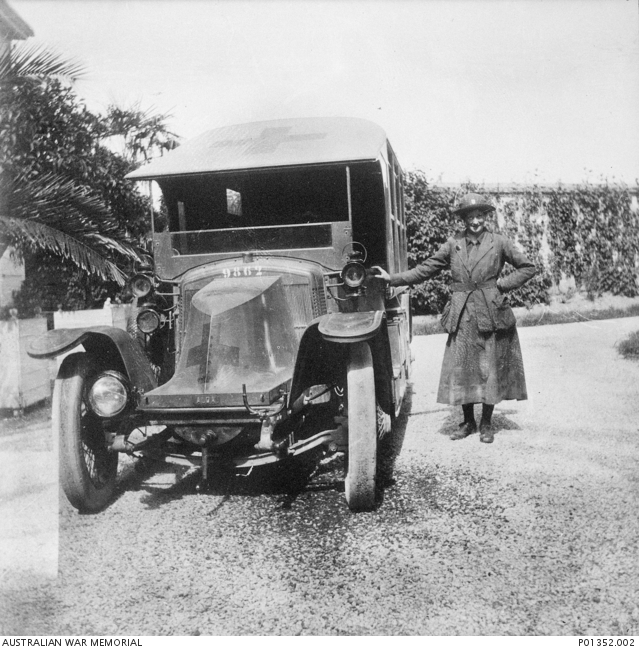
Olive May Kelso King beside an Alda Motor Ambulance in Troyes

In the summer of 1914, while King was visiting her sister Sunny in England, war broke out in Europe. Olive served briefly as an ambulance driver in Belgium, working for the Allied Field Ambulance Corps (AFAC), a volunteer organization. Using funds from her father, she supplied her own vehicle, a used lorry which she had converted into a 16-seater ambulance and christened 'Ella the Elephant' because of its size and weight.

In 1915 King joined the Scottish Women's Hospitals (Girton and Newnham Unit) and was sent to the Sainte-Savine field hospital, near Troyes, France. Conditions at the field hospital were tough. Wounded men were housed in canvas tents connected by long lines of duckboards in muddy fields adjacent to the Château de Chanteloup.

In November 1915, the unit was sent to the Macedonian front, landing at Salonika, Greece and moving up to Gevgelija on the Greco-Serbian border. Six weeks later the Bulgarian forces were advancing rapidly and the hospital had to be evacuated in 24 hours. Thirty women, helped by 40 Royal Engineers, were able to dismantle the hospital before it was overrun. By midnight the whole staff had got away except the three female chauffeurs. It was King's decision to head for the nearest railway station. They managed to get themselves and their ambulances on the last train before the station was bombed. Thirteen French ambulance drivers, who tried to make their way to Salonika via a rough track by Doiran, were ambushed by the Bulgarians, their cars taken, and all killed or taken prisoner.

By the end of July 1916, King had left the Scottish Women's Hospital and joined the Serbian army as a driver attached to the Headquarters of the Medical Service at Salonika. By this time the Serbs had lost most of their transport and 'Ella' was one of only three cars attached to the Medical Headquarters.

On 18 August 1917, the day of the Great Thessaloniki Fire of 1917, King transported people and records to safety, driving for twenty four hours at a stretch.

In the fall of 1917, King's father raised money from Australian donors for her to set up mobile canteens to feed the people of Serbia. Her work in Belgrade and other Serbian cities continued until 1920.

For her work during the war, King received a total of four medals from the Serbian government, including the Order of St. Sava, the highest award for humanitarian service.

== Post-war activities and death ==
Due to her father's failing health, King returned to Sydney in 1920. She took a position as a volunteer and speaker for the Girl Guides Australia, serving as State Secretary and Assistant State Commissioner. She was the first Australian recipient of the Silver Fish Award in 1931, Girl Guiding's highest adult honour.

During World War II, she volunteered to drive for the Australian Army but was told that she was too old. Still wanting to contribute in some way, she studied aircraft inspection and worked as a quality examiner at de Havilland Aircraft Pty Ltd from 1942 to 1944.

King moved to Melbourne in 1956 and died there in November 1958.

In 1986 her sister Hazel King published letters that she sent during her war service in the book One Woman at War: the Letters of Olive King, 1915-1920.

== In popular culture ==
In her 2022 novel, Salonika Burning, the Australian writer Gail Jones fictionalises Olive King (as 'Olive'), and her experiences in Macedonia, along with British painters Grace Pailthorpe and Stanley Spencer, and Australian writer Miles Franklin.

== See also ==
- Other notable women volunteers in the Scottish Women's Hospitals for Foreign Service
- Women in World War I
- Australian women in World War I
- The Serbian campaign (1914-1915)

== Sources ==
- Australian Dictionary of Biography
- King, Hazel (1987). One Woman at War: Letters of Olive King, 1915-1920. Melbourne University Press
- Gilchrist, Hugh (1997). Australians and Greeks, Volume 2. Halstead Press
