= Andrew Houison =

Australian doctor and philatelist (1850–1912)

Dr. Andrew Houison B.A., M.B., Mast. Surg.,
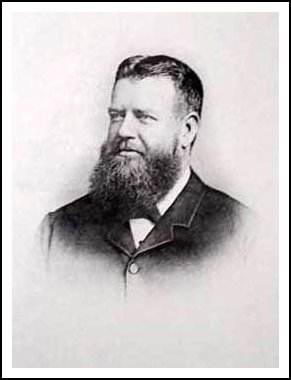
- Born: 1 January 1850; Parramatta, New South Wales
- Died: 22 August 1912 (aged 62); Sydney, New South Wales
- Education: Newington College; University of Sydney; University of Edinburgh
- Occupation: Medical practitioner
- Board member of: Founding President of the Royal Australian Historical Society; Secretary to the NSW Medical Board
- Parent(s): James and Ann Houison (née Stark)

Andrew Houison (1 January 1850 – 22 August 1912) was a Sydney medical practitioner, amateur historian and philatelist. He was one of the "Fathers of Philately" and entered the Roll of Distinguished Philatelists in 1921.

== Early life ==
Houison was born in Parramatta to James and Ann Houison, both from Scotland. His father was a successful builder and architect in Parramatta. Andrew was the youngest of ten children, five girls and five boys. He attended Mr Mills' Briar Cottage Academy in Parramatta and then The King's School, Parramatta in 1858. He commenced at Newington College as a foundation student in 1863 and is number 10 on the roll of students. In 1865 he was the college's first Dux. He enrolled at the University of Sydney in February 1866 and gained a BA degree in 1869.

== Medical career ==
Houison continued his education at the University of Edinburgh where he graduated in medicine, M.B. Ch.M. (M.Surg). He did post-graduate research in antisepsis with Professor Joseph Lister and was offered a position as Lister's research assistant. Instead, he returned to Sydney where after a period in private practice he became Secretary to the New South Wales Medical Board. He was elected Honorary Physician to the Sydney Hospital and enjoyed a successful medical career.

== Philately ==
Houison began collecting stamps in about 1865. He was a specialist in the postal history of New South Wales and was President of both the New South Wales and Australian Philatelic Associations. He was specially commissioned by the Government of New South Wales to produce a history of the Post Office and stamps of the territory which was prepared within a very short period of time and published in 1890.

== Australian history ==
Houison was the founding President of the Royal Australian Historical Society in 1901, his interest in history being variously attributed to philately, genealogical research in Scotland and his father's work in the development of his home town, Parramatta.

== Death ==
Houison died on 22 August 1912 in Sydney. He was survived by a daughter and two sons. His wife had pre-deceased him.

== Selected publications ==
- History of the Post Office, together with an historical account of the issue of postage stamps in New South Wales. Sydney: C. Potter, Government Printer, 1890.

== See also ==
- Postage stamps and postal history of New South Wales
