= Stefan Lukić =

Stefan Lukić may refer to:

- Stefan Lukic (footballer)
- Stefan Lukić (artist)
