= Stefan Lukić (artist) =

Serbian artist

Stefan Lukić Стефан Лукић
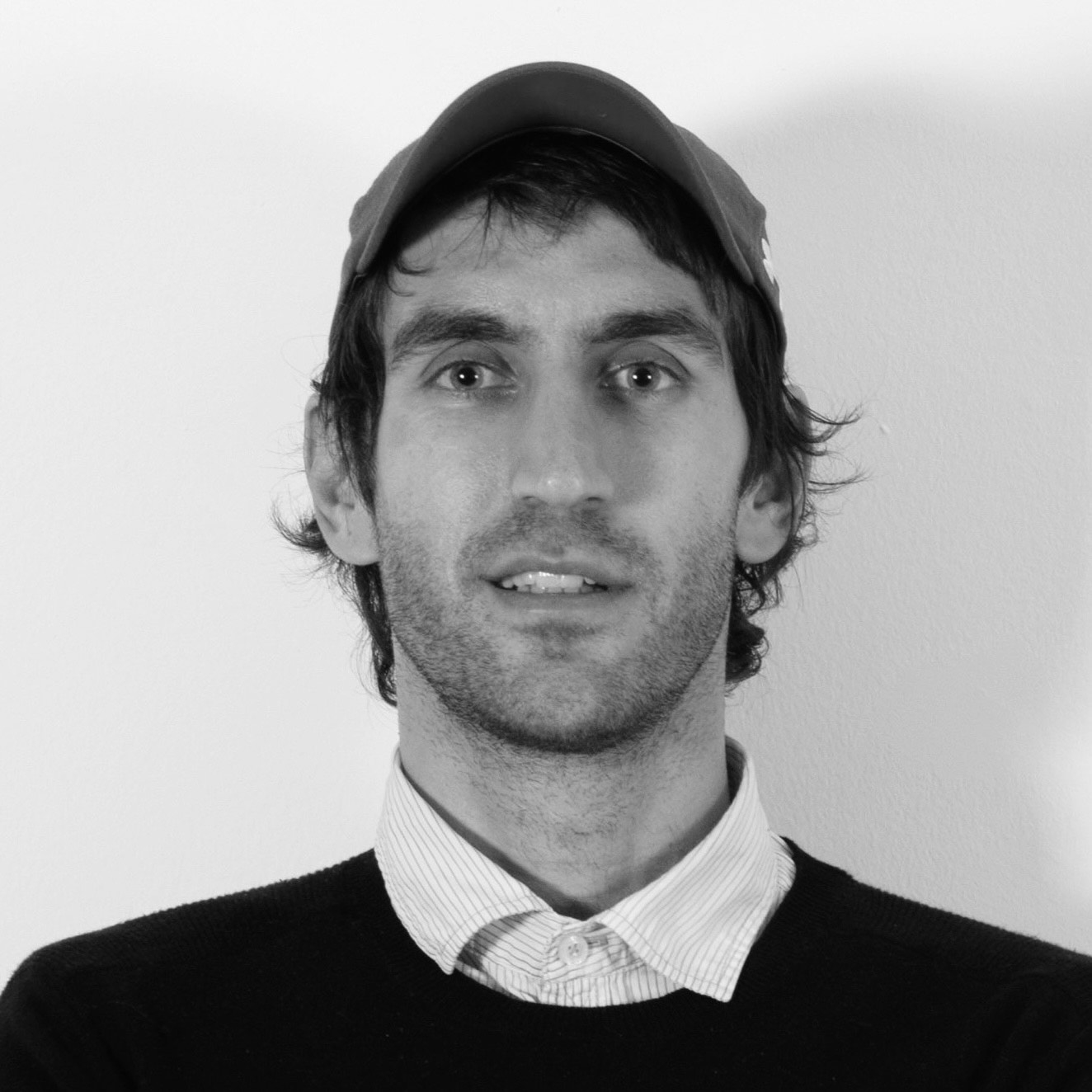
- Lukić in 2021
- Born: 10 October 1985 (age 40); Užice, PR Serbia, FPR Yugoslavia

Stefan Lukić (Serbian-Cyrillic: Стефан Лукић; born 10 October 1985) is a Serbian visual and performance artist. Lukić's artistic work is created in the domain of painting, drawing, performance as well as interventions in public space.

== Biography ==
He graduated in applied painting from the Faculty of Applied Arts of the University of Arts in Belgrade. He spent the third year of his undergraduate studies as an exchange student at the Beaux-Arts de Paris. Before leaving for Paris, he made a performance and an exhibition titled I'm Going so that I could return. Lukić received his master's degree in painting at the Faculty of Fine Arts in 2022. He studied at the Royal Academy in Amsterdam. He was on residencies at the art space "Kunstepidemin" in Gothenburg, the art space "Homesession" in Barcelona, in Paris as part of the city of arts residency program Cité internationale des arts, as well as the artist residency "Domus" in Galatina, Italy.

Alongside Embassy of Poland in Serbia, he created the art project "Nezavisna / Nipodległa". He was in the final selection of the award for contemporary art "Mangelos". In the final of the July 2021 prize competition, he realized an art project in Barcelona, Monte Carlo, Milan and Belgrade. In 2022, he participated in a memorial for Nadežda Petrović.

In addition to painting, he performs various artistic performances in Serbia and abroad. He purposefully chooses pompous, epic titles for his artworks. In 2020, he performed the work As Far as My Feet Will Carry Me, in Belgrade. Vladimir Tabašević wrote a poem about this work, which Lukić then published on a bigger scale at the Freedom Square in Novi Sad as part of a performance called Size (doesn't) matters, in which forty people participated. Grand Tour 2025: Nulla dies sine linea was a durational performance by Lukić, in which he ran 232.5 km from Venice to southern Italy over 30 day. He created an arithmetic progression by extending his distance by 500 metres each day, to trace GPS lines across five countries, reflecting on endurance and the demands of productivity in contemporary culture.

Stefan Lukić had group exhibitions in: Gothenburg, Paris, Belgrade, Novi Sad, Niš, Kragujevac and other cities.

Lukić was awarded: Award for painting of the Faculty of Applied Arts, University of Arts in Belgrade (2016), Award for young artists "Bite" (2020) and the "Golden palette" Award from the Association of Fine Artists of Serbia (ULUS). He has been a member of the Association of Fine Artists of Serbia (ULUS) since 2021.

He lives and works between Belgrade and Paris.

== Selected exhibits ==
- Capital Offense, Quattro Gallery, Milan, Italy (2025)
- The Last Lap in Monza, Creative Studio Opal, Milan, Italy (2021)
- Second round in Monte Carlo, in the slaughterhouse "Maison Lino", Monte Carlo, Monaco (2021)
- A Streetcar Called Desire - First Round Obverse and Reverse, Homesession Barcelona, Spain (2021)
- Size does not matter, Alternative space Kvaka 22, Belgrade, Serbia (2021)
- 24/7, Konstepidemin, Gothenburg, Sweden (2021)
- Crta, Student City Cultural Centre, Belgrade, Serbia (2018)
- Interspace, U10 Art Space, Belgrade, Serbia (2018)
- YUGOnostalgia, the National Theatre, Užice, Serbia (2017)
