= Mabel Grouitch =

American archeologist, philanthropist and voluntary nurse

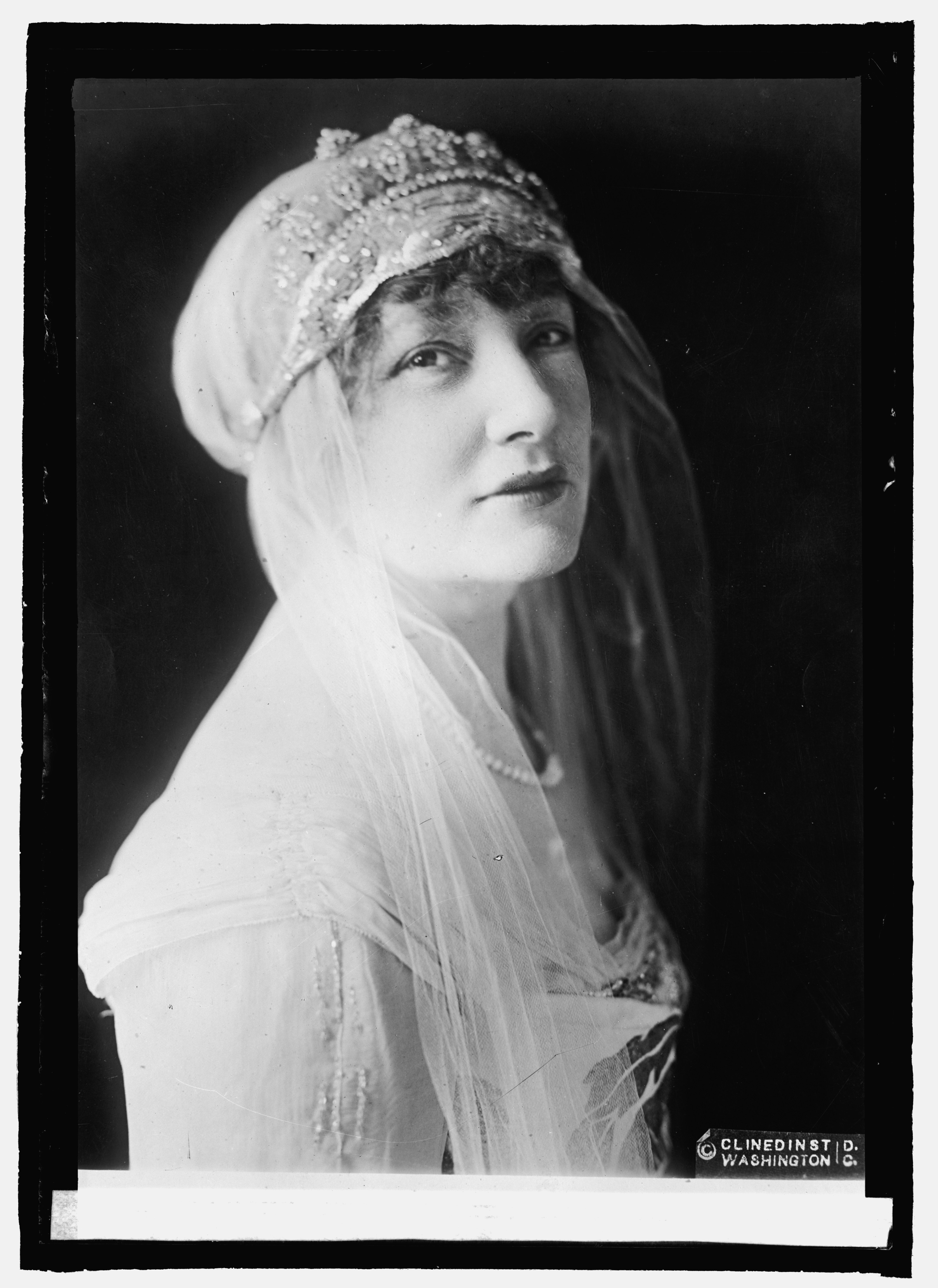
- Born: Mabel Dunlop; August 13, 1872; Clarksburg, West Virginia, U.S.
- Died: August 13, 1956; Georgetown, Washington D.C, U.S.
- Other names: Madame Mabel Grujić
- Occupations: archeologist, philanthropist, nursing volunteer
- Known for: Philanthropy work
- Spouse: Slavko Grujić

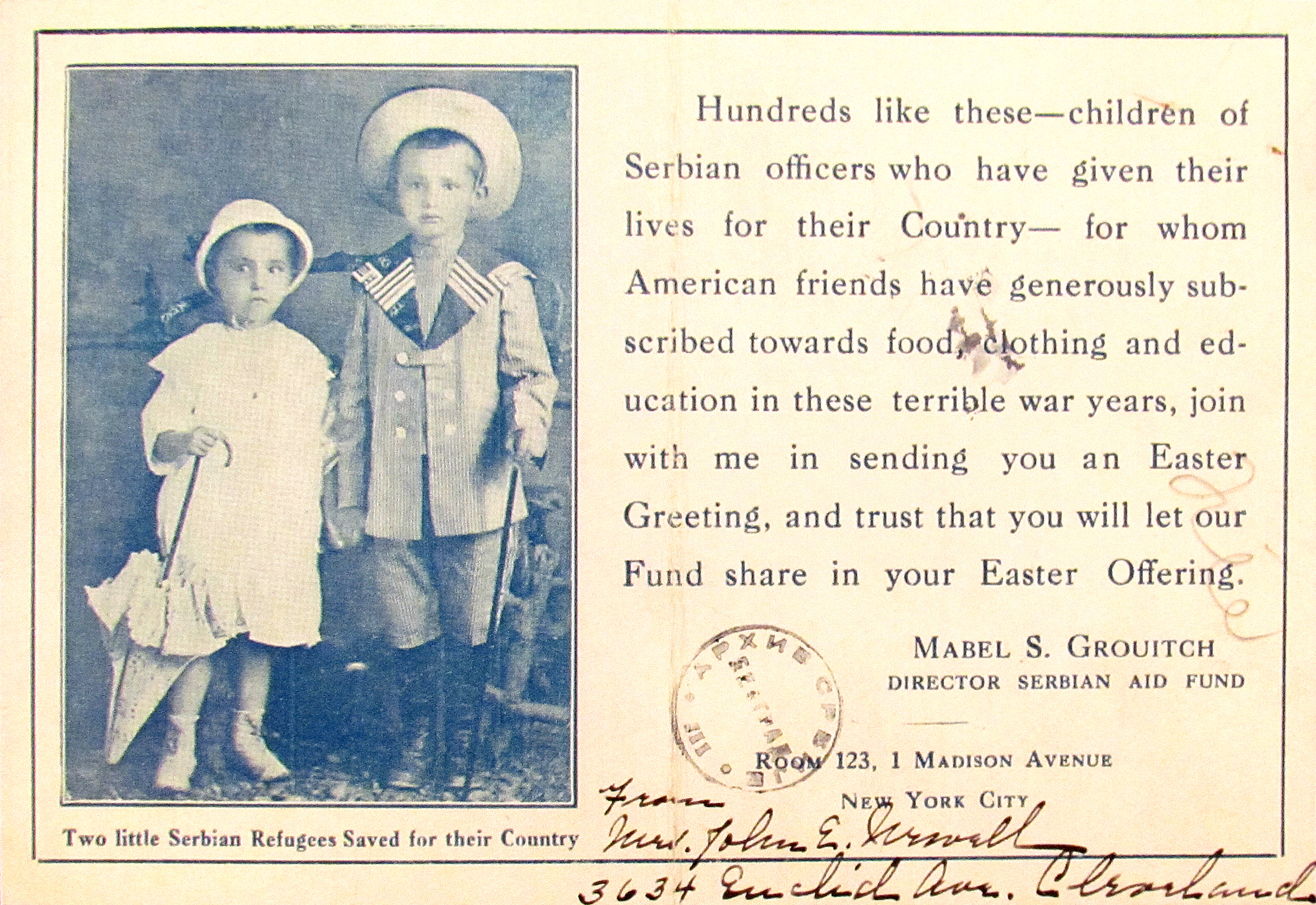
A correspondent of the Serbian Aid Fund with the appeal for donations for the Serbian war orphans

Mabel Grouitch (née Dunlop; August 13, 1872 or August 13, 1881 – August 13, 1956) was an American archeologist, philanthropist and voluntary nurse with the Red Cross in Serbia, during the two Balkan wars and World War I.

Grouitch started working on relief efforts during the Balkan Wars, establishing the Mabel Grouitch Baby Hospital in Macedonia. As secretary-general of the Serbian Foreign Office, her husband Slavko Grujić received the Austro-Hungarian ultimatum to Serbia in 1914. Following the invasion of Serbia by the Central Powers she evaded across the Albanian highlands with the Serbian Army during the Great Retreat; she then spent much of her life in the United States, where she raised funds for the Serbian relief fund. When World War II broke out, Grouitch escaped Serbia while Belgrade was being bombed taking refugee children with her.

She was decorated by Yugoslavia, England, France, Romania and more countries for her work.

== Early years and education ==
Mabel Gordon Dunlop was originally from Clarksburg, West Virginia. Her father was a prominent railroad man of the early days in Virginia and later in Chicago, Illinois. When she was still young, Mabel became interested in the study of archaeology and ethnology, to which her father was greatly devoted. In 1901, after studying at Chicago University for several years, she went to Athens, Greece to study archaeology. While a student in Athens she met her husband, Dr Slavko Grujić, a member of a distinguished family of Serbia, who was at the time Chargé d'affaires of the Serbian Legation in Paris. He would later become Serbian Chargé d'Affaires at the Court of St James's, London, England.

== Career ==
Grouitch devoted herself to the work of emancipating the women of Serbia. The University at Belgrade admitted women, but a lot of Serbian girls were unaware of it. It was these young ladies she wanted to help provide education in scientific, cultural, and domestic arts. Grouitch and certain noblewomen of Belgrade determined to found a boarding school in the city. The wives of the representatives of the Serbian Government at the various courts of Europe helped Grouitch raise money for it. Mabel was particularly interested in establishing an agricultural course for girls in connection with the University of Belgrade, because, according to Mabel, a son cannot be spared to go and study agriculture since sons must enter the army, a daughter could be spared and then return home to share with her family what she had learned. Mabel Grouitch raised a large sum of money from her friends in the United States to assist with these endeavors. Grouitch raised money for the Serbian Red Cross during the Balkan Wars. Her "tireless campaign" led to founding of the Serbian Relief Fund and led a group of nurses from the United Kingdom to Serbia in 1914 during the First World War, becoming good friends with Flora Sandes.

=== The Mabel Grouitch Baby Hospital ===
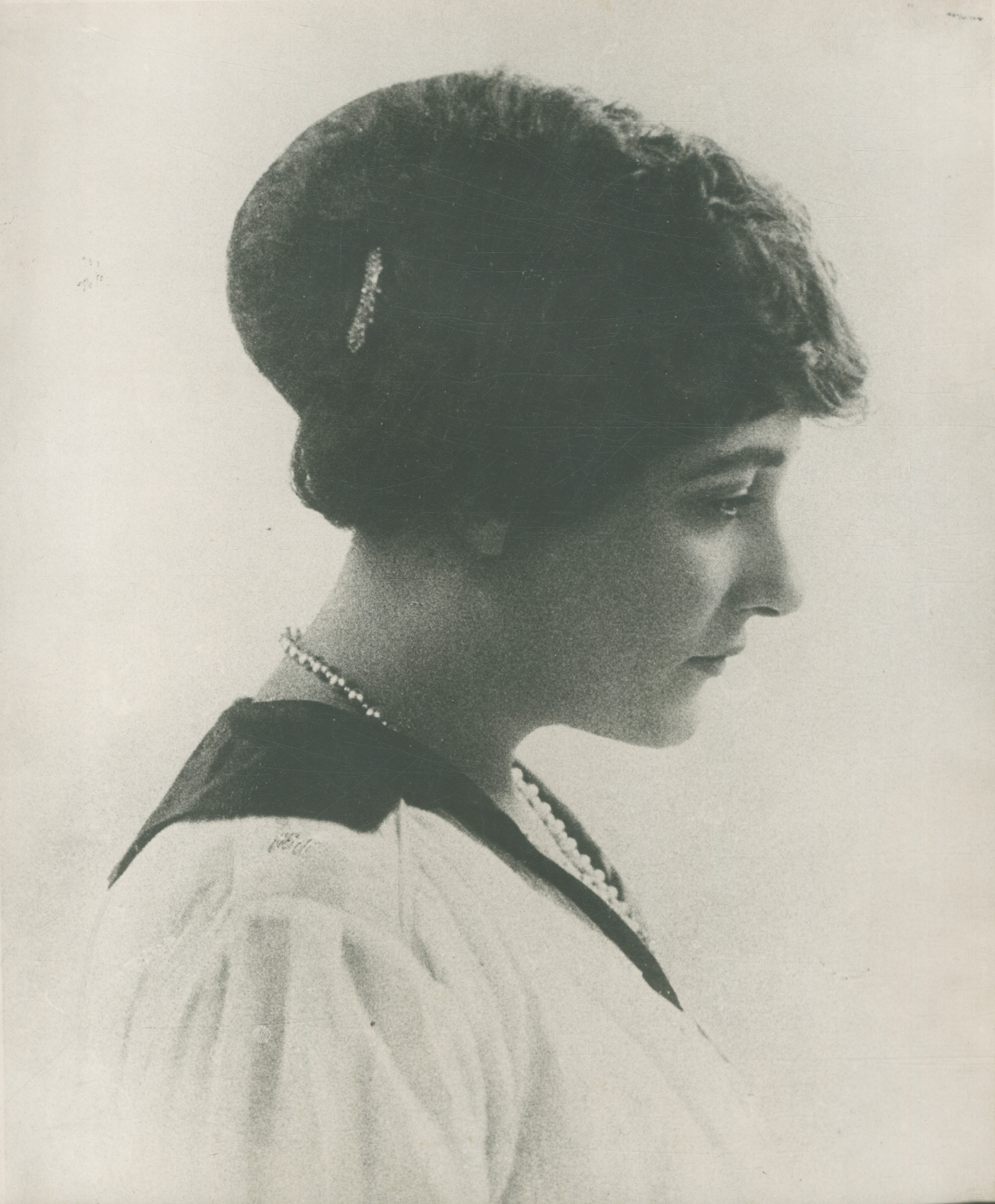
Portrait of Mabel Grouitch

Early in July 1915, Grouitch, now the wife of the undersecretary of foreign affairs in Serbia, turned over a sum of money to the American Red Cross, and requested it to organize a unit consisting of two doctors and two nurses to proceed to Serbia with the necessary equipment and supplies to establish a hospital for infants and young children. These funds were collected as a result of her labors from philanthropic people in the United States, and from time to time since then other donations for the hospital came and were added to the fund.

Dr. Louise Tayler Jones, of Washington, D.C., on Grouitch's request, volunteered to proceed to Serbia as medical director and organize the hospital, and Dr. Catherine Travis, of New Britain, Connecticut, was appointed assistant. Maud Metcalf and Grace Utley, two American Red Cross nurses, were assigned to duty as the nursing personnel of the hospital.

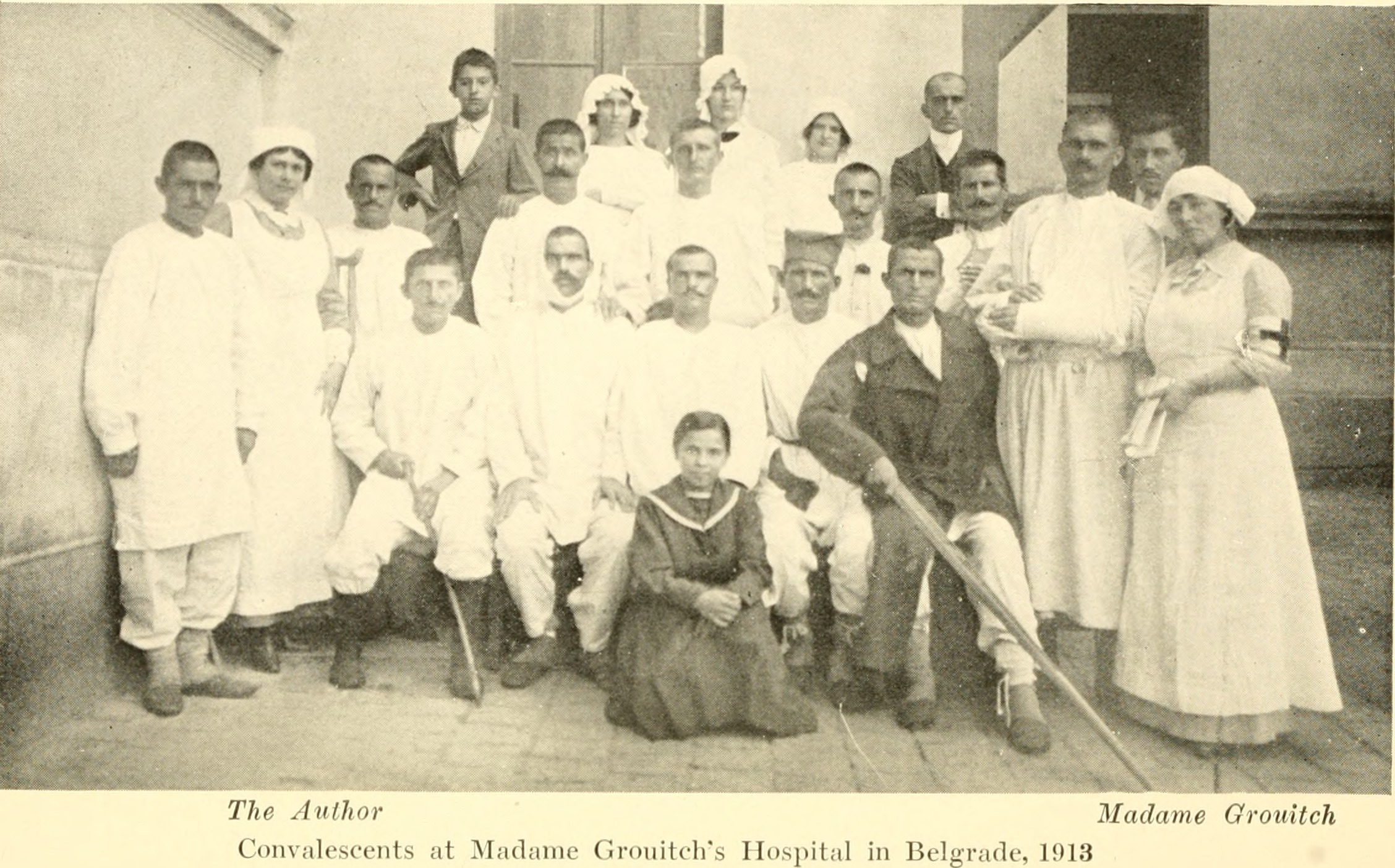
Grouitch's Hospital in Belgrade, 1913

In the middle of the war, Dr Jones and Dr Travis sailed on the steamship Vasilefs Constantinos, to Greece, reaching Piraeus on 19 July and Athens on 4 August. From there, they proceeded to Niš, the temporary capital of Serbia, which they reached 10 August. The two nurses sailed on 30 July on the steamship Patris with the entire equipment and the supplies for the hospital. They reported to Dr. Jones at Niš on 25 August .

On 30 August, Mabel Grouitch arrived in Serbia with Elizabeth Shelley, an American woman, who had been acting as her secretary in the United States, and who proceeded to Serbia to work in the baby hospital as a volunteer nurse. The hospital was opened in Niš for the reception of patients on 29 August 1915, under the name of the Mable Grouitch Baby Hospital.

Dr. Jones, after giving the hospital a good start, sailed from Saloniki, Greece on 30 September and reported to the United States on 22 October 1915. She was succeeded by Dr. Travis as director. Very soon afterward, Serbia was invaded by combined Austro-Hungarian, German and Bulgarian forces, on 13 October, the baby hospital ceased to exist and became a field ambulance to care for the sick and wounded Serbian soldiers.

After she fled across the Albanian highlands with the Serbian Army during the Great Retreat, she spent the majority of her life in the United States, where she raised money for the Serbian relief fund. With refugee children in tow, Grouitch fled Serbia on the outbreak of World War II as Belgrade was being bombed.

== Later life ==
According to historian Barbara Tuchman, during the first and second world war, Mable Grouitch was involved in the recruitment of agents for the British Naval Intelligence.

She died on 13 August 1956 in a Georgetown hospital of leukemia in Washington, D.C.

== See also ==
- Nadežda Petrović
- Natalija Neti Munk
