= Natalija Neti Munk =

Serbian humanitarian worker (1864–1924)

Natalija Neti Munk (1864 – 8 April 1924) was a Serbian humanitarian worker, volunteer nurse, and decorated war hero. She was involved in the Serbo-Bulgarian War, the First Balkan War, the Second Balkan War, and World War I.

== Early years ==
Natalija Neti Tajtačak was born in Belgrade, in 1864. Her father was Natan Tajtačak, a poor Belgrade craftsman. As a child, she remembered the Serbian-Turkish Wars, and perhaps that survival was defined by her future voluntary work.

== Career ==
As a volunteer nurse, she applied for the first time at the age of 20, during the Serbo-Bulgarian War of 1885, and later participated in all the wars Serbia led for independence, liberation and unification. On the outbreak of World War I, she volunteered as a nurse and despite contracting typhus in 1914, she did not stop her work. During the retreat of the Serbian army, without any help, Munk collected some material and resources, and established a military hospital in Kruševac, where she tried to remain until the return of the Serbian army. During the occupation, she was frequently imprisoned and was twice charged with the offence of "collecting aid for the Serbian irregulars".

After the end of World War I, she continued to work in humanitarian work. She was a member of the Governing Board of the Jewish Women's Society, the League of War Volunteers, and the Serbian Red Cross. For her humanitarian work, she was honored with the Medal of the Red Cross and the Cross of Mercy. She was recognized for her work and received the Golden and Silver Medal of Queen Natalija, two St Sava Medals, Memorials from all the wars from 1885 to 1918, a Medal of the Red Cross and the Cross of Mercy. She also received the highest military honor, the Karadjordje's Star with Swords.

== Personal life ==
She was married to Gutman Munk, a tailor who moved to Belgrade from Austria. Gutman held a small tailor shop in Vuk Karadzic Street, where he was manufacturing suits for more than a dozen Belgrade wholesalers. Gutman and Natalia Munk had seven children.

She died in Belgrade on April 8, 1924. Beginning in 1885, until her death, she was one of the most prominent members of Serbian society.

== See also ==
- Mabel Grouitch
- Nadežda Petrović, who died as a volunteer nurse in Serbia in 1915.
