= List of members of the London School Board =

This is a list of members of the London School Board. The board existed from 1870 to 1904 when the London County Council replaced it as the local education authority for the County of London.

== Divisions 1870–1885 ==
The London School Board was created by the Elementary Education Act 1870 (33 & 34 Vict. c. 75). The act provided that the "Metropolis" (that is the area of the Metropolitan Board of Works) should be divided into ten named divisions for the elections of members to the board. The exact boundaries and numbers of members for each division were fixed by order of Education Department and approved by the Privy Council on 7 October 1870 as follows:

Division	Contents	Number of members
City	The parliamentary borough of London less those parts of Furnival's Inn and Staple Inn within the constituency.	Four
Chelsea	The parliamentary borough of Chelsea (The parishes of Chelsea, Fulham, Hammersmith and Kensington).	Four
Finsbury	The parliamentary borough of Finsbury less the detached portion of Clerkenwell (The parishes of Charterhouse, Clerkenwell, Glasshouse Yard, Gray's Inn, Islington, Liberty of the Rolls, Saffron Hill, Hatton Garden, Ely Rents and Ely Place, Lincoln's Inn, St Andrew Holborn Above the Bars with St George the Martyr, St Giles in the Fields and St George Bloomsbury, St Luke, St Sepulchre and Stoke Newington).; Furnival's Inn and Staple Inn (including the parts in the City of London).	Six
Greenwich	The parliamentary borough of Greenwich; Those parts of the parishes of Greenwich and Woolwich not included in the parliamentary borough; The Plumstead and Lewisham Districts as constituted by the Metropolis Management Act 1855. (The parishes of Charlton next Woolwich, Deptford St Nicholas, Deptford St Paul, Eltham, Greenwich, Lee, Lewisham, Kidbrooke, Plumstead and Woolwich).	Four
Hackney	The parliamentary borough of Hackney (The parishes of Bethnal Green, Hackney and Shoreditch).	Five
Lambeth	The parliamentary borough of Lambeth; Those parts of the parishes of Camberwell and Lambeth outside the parliamentary borough; Wandsworth District as constituted by the Metropolis Management Act 1855. (The parishes of Battersea, Camberwell, Clapham, Lambeth, Newington, Putney, Streatham, Tooting Graveney and Wandsworth).	Five
Marylebone	The parliamentary borough of Marylebone (The parishes of Paddington, St. Marylebone and St. Pancras).; The parish of St John, Hampstead.	Seven
Southwark	The parliamentary borough of Southwark (The parishes of Bermondsey, Rotherhithe, Southwark Christchurch, Southwark St George the Martyr, Southwark St John Horsleydown, Southwark St Olave and Southwark St Saviour).	Four
Tower Hamlets	The parliamentary borough of Tower Hamlets (The parishes of Bow, Bromley, Holy Trinity Minories, Limehouse, Mile End New Town, Mile End Old Town, Norton Folgate, Old Artillery Ground, Poplar, Ratcliffe, St Botolph Without Aldgate, St George in the East, St Katherine by the Tower, Spitalfields, Tower of London, Old Tower Without, Wapping and Whitechapel).	Five
Westminster	The parliamentary borough of Westminster (The parishes of Close of the Collegiate Church of St Peter, Liberty of the Duchy of Lancaster, St Anne within the Liberty of Westminster, St Clement Danes, St George Hanover Square, St Martin in the Fields, St Mary le Strand, St Paul Covent Garden, Precinct of the Savoy, Westminster St James, Westminster St John the Evangelist and Westminster St Margaret).	Five

== Members 1870–1876 ==
Division	Members 1870–1873	Members 1873–1876
City of London (4 seats)	Rev. William Rogers; Resigned; John Bennett; Co-opted 21 February 1872 Knighted 14 March 1872	Francis Peek
City of London (4 seats)	Samuel Morley MP	Samuel Morley MP
City of London (4 seats)	Alderman William James Richmond Cotton	Alderman William James Richmond Cotton; MP from 1874, Lord Mayor of London 1874–1875
City of London (4 seats)	William Sutton Gover	Rev. Canon Robert Gregory
Chelsea (4 seats)	Rev. Canon John Gabriel Cromwell	Rev. Canon John Gabriel Cromwell
Chelsea (4 seats)	Lord Lawrence	Rev. Charles Darby Reade
Chelsea (4 seats)	George Middleton Kiell	Professor John Hall Gladstone
Chelsea (4 seats)	Robert Freeman	Robert Freeman
Finsbury (6 seats)	Edward James Tabrum	Edward James Tabrum; Died 17 July 1875. Rev. Mark Wilks; Elected 29 November 1875.
Finsbury (6 seats)	William McCullagh Torrens MP; Resigned; Hugh Owen; Elected 3 April 1872.	Charles Henry Lovell
Finsbury (6 seats)	Rev. John Rodgers	Rev. John Rodgers
Finsbury (6 seats)	Thomas Chatfeild Clarke	Thomas Chatfeild Clarke
Finsbury (6 seats)	Benjamin Lucraft	Benjamin Lucraft
Finsbury (6 seats)	Sir Francis Lycett	Rev. Robert Maguire
Greenwich (4 seats)	Emily Davies	Hon. and Rev. Augustus Legge
Greenwich (4 seats)	John Macgregor	John Macgregor
Greenwich (4 seats)	Rev. Canon Dr. John Cale Miller Resigned; Henry Gover; Elected 27 May 1872.	Henry Gover
Greenwich (4 seats)	Rev. Benjamin Waugh	Rev. Benjamin Waugh
Hackney (5 seats)	Charles Reed MP	Charles Reed MP
Hackney (5 seats)	William Green	Rev. Thomas Bowman Stephenson
Hackney (5 seats)	Thomas Bywater Smithies	Richard Foster
Hackney (5 seats)	John Hiscutt Crossman	Rev. Joseph Green Pilkington
Hackney (5 seats)	Rev. James Allanson Picton	Rev. James Allanson Picton
Lambeth (5 seats)	James Stiff	James Stiff
Lambeth (5 seats)	John Edward Tressider	Thomas Edmund Heller
Lambeth (5 seats)	Sir Thomas Tilson	Rev. George Mollett Murphy
Lambeth (5 seats)	Alexander McArthur	Rev. Evan Daniel
Lambeth (5 seats)	Charles Few	William Frederick Morgan
Marylebone (7 seats)	Elizabeth Garrett	Mrs Alice Cowell
Marylebone (7 seats)	Prof Thomas Henry Huxley; Resigned; Rev. J Llewelyn Davies; Elected 30 March 1872.	Arthur Mills
Marylebone (7 seats)	Rev. Prebendary Thorold	Rev. Prebendary William Josiah Irons
Marylebone (7 seats)	Rev. Dr. Joseph Angus	Rev. Llewelyn David Bevan
Marylebone (7 seats)	Edward John Hutchins	Jane Agnes Chessar
Marylebone (7 seats)	William Hepworth Dixon	John Harris Heal; Died 19 February 1876.
Marylebone (7 seats)	James Watson	James Watson
Southwark (4 seats)	Rev. John Mee	Rev. Robert Marshall Martin
Southwark (4 seats)	Alfred Lafone	Alfred Lafone
Southwark (4 seats)	James Wallace	James Wallace
Southwark (4 seats)	John Brouncker Ingle	Rev. John Sinclair
Tower Hamlets (5 seats)	Edmund Hay Currie	Edmund Hay Currie; Knighted 1876.
Tower Hamlets (5 seats)	William Pearce (Note: There were two individuals named William Pearce, father and son, on the London School Board. The father represented Tower Hamlets from 1870 to 1873. He was a manufacturing chemist of East India Road, Snaresbrook and Bow Common, and died on 18 June 1891 The son, born in 1853, also represented Tower Hamlets from 1876 to 1885. He was later a member of the London County Council and a member of parliament and was knighted in 1915.)	Rev. Joseph Bardsley
Tower Hamlets (5 seats)	Thomas Scrutton	Thomas Scrutton
Tower Hamlets (5 seats)	Edward North Buxton	Edward North Buxton
Tower Hamlets (5 seats)	Arthur Langdale	Arthur Langdale
Westminster (5 seats)	William Henry Smith MP	William Henry Smith MP; Resigned 21 November 1874; George Taverner Miller; Elected 29 November 1875.
Westminster (5 seats)	Viscount Sandon MP; Resigned 21 February 1872; Viscount Mahon MP; Elected 19 April 1872.	George Potter
Westminster (5 seats)	Rev. Dr. Alfred Barry	Rev. Dr. Alfred Barry
Westminster (5 seats)	Rev. Dr. James Harrison Rigg	Rev. Dr. James Harrison Rigg
Westminster (5 seats)	Charles Edward Mudie	Lord Napier and Ettrick

== Members 1876–1885 ==
Under the terms of section 44 of the Elementary Education Act 1876 (39 & 40 Vict. c. 70) casual vacancies occurring in the membership of school boards due to death or resignation were no longer filled by-elections but by co-option.

Division	Members 1876–1879	Members 1879–1882	Members 1882–1885
City of London (4 seats)	Sir John Bennett	Rosamond Davenport Hill	Rosamond Davenport Hill
City of London (4 seats)	Francis Peek	Henry Spicer	Henry Spicer
City of London (4 seats)	Alderman William James Richmond Cotton MP	William Henry Bonnewell	Sir Reginald Hanson
City of London (4 seats)	William Sutton Gover	William Sutton Gover	Henry Charles Richards
Chelsea (4 seats: increased to 5 in 1882)	Joseph Firth Bottomley Firth	Julia Augusta Webster	William Bousfield
Chelsea (4 seats: increased to 5 in 1882)	Rev. Charles Darby Reade	Capt. Henry Berkeley	Rev. Richard Denny Urlin
Chelsea (4 seats: increased to 5 in 1882)	Professor John Hall Gladstone	Professor John Hall Gladstone	Professor John Hall Gladstone
Chelsea (4 seats: increased to 5 in 1882)	Robert Freeman	Robert Freeman	Robert Freeman
Chelsea (4 seats: increased to 5 in 1882)			George Mitchell
Finsbury (6 seats)	Rev. Mark Wilks	Rev. Mark Wilks	Rev. Mark Wilks
Finsbury (6 seats)	Charles Henry Lovell	Thomas Lee Roberts	Thomas Lee Roberts
Finsbury (6 seats)	Rev. John Rodgers	Rev. John Rodgers; Died. Sir Ughtred James Kay-Shuttleworth, Bt. Co-opted 16 December 1880.	William Roston Bourke
Finsbury (6 seats)	Elizabeth Surr	Elizabeth Surr	Rev. William Thomas Thornhill Webber
Finsbury (6 seats)	Benjamin Lucraft	Benjamin Lucraft	Benjamin Lucraft
Finsbury (6 seats)	Lord Francis Hervey MP	Rev. Samuel Wainwright	Rev. Dr. Samuel Wainwright
Greenwich (4 seats)	Canon Charles Forbes Septimus Money	Rev. Thomas Daniel Cox Morse	Rev. Thomas Daniel Cox Morse
Greenwich (4 seats)	Guildford Barker Richardson	Guildford Barker Richardson	Edwin Hughes
Greenwich (4 seats)	Henry Gover	Henry Gover	Henry Gover
Greenwich (4 seats)	James Ebenezer Saunders	James Ebenezer Saunders	James Ebenezer Saunders
Hackney (5 seats)	Charles Reed MP	Charles Reed MP; Died 25 March 1881; Benjamin Smyth Olding; Co-opted 12 May 1881.	Benjamin Smyth Olding
Hackney (5 seats)	John Jones	Rev. Henry Daniel Pearson	Rev. Henry Daniel Pearson
Hackney (5 seats)	Richard Foster	Edward Jones	Thomas J Bevan junior
Hackney (5 seats)	Florence Fenwick Miller	Florence Fenwick Miller	Florence Fenwick Miller
Hackney (5 seats)	Rev. James Allanson Picton	John James Jones	John Lobb
Lambeth (6 seats: increased to 8 in 1882)	James Stiff	James Stiff	Rev. Charles E Brooke
Lambeth (6 seats: increased to 8 in 1882)	Rev. Frederick Tugwell	Henrietta Müller	Henrietta Müller
Lambeth (6 seats: increased to 8 in 1882)	Rev. George Mollett Murphy	Rev. George Mollett Murphy	Rev. George Mollett Murphy
Lambeth (6 seats: increased to 8 in 1882)	Rev. Evan Daniel	Charles Richard White	Charles Richard White
Lambeth (6 seats: increased to 8 in 1882)	Stanley Kemp-Welch	Alexander Coghill Wylie; Disqualified. Stanley Kemp-Welch; Co-opted 21 October 1880.	Hon. Conrad Adderly Dillon
Lambeth (6 seats: increased to 8 in 1882)	Thomas Edmund Heller	Thomas Edmund Heller	Thomas Edmund Heller
Lambeth (6 seats: increased to 8 in 1882)			Edward Barnaby Gudgeon
Lambeth (6 seats: increased to 8 in 1882)			George Crispe Whiteley
Marylebone (7 seats)	James Watson	James Watson; Died 1 September 1880. Dr Benjamin Ward Richardson; Co-opted 21 October 1880.	George Barclay Bruce
Marylebone (7 seats)	Arthur Mills	Arthur Mills	Arthur Mills
Marylebone (7 seats)	Thomas Collins	Rev. Joseph Robert Diggle	Rev. Joseph Robert Diggle
Marylebone (7 seats)	Rev. Dr. Joseph Angus	Rev. Dr. Joseph Angus	Rev. William Barker
Marylebone (7 seats)	Rev. John James Coxhead	Rev. John James Coxhead	Edward Bond; Resigned; Giles Theodore Pilcher; Co-opted 24 April 1884.
Marylebone (7 seats)	Edward Lyulph Stanley	Edward Lyulph Stanley	Edward Lyulph Stanley
Marylebone (7 seats)	Alice Westlake	Alice Westlake	Alice Westlake
Southwark (4 seats)	Henry George Heald	Edward Corry	Rev. Charles d'Aguilar Lawrence
Southwark (4 seats)	Helen Taylor	Helen Taylor	Helen Taylor
Southwark (4 seats)	Rev. Robert Maguire	Alexander Hawkins	Alexander Hawkins
Southwark (4 seats)	Rev. John Sinclair	Mary E Richardson	Mary E Richardson
Tower Hamlets (5 seats)	William Pearce	William Pearce	William Pearce
Tower Hamlets (5 seats)	Rev. Joseph Bardsley	Spencer Calmeyer Charrington	Sir Edmund Hay Currie
Tower Hamlets (5 seats)	Thomas Scrutton	Thomas Scrutton; Resigned after proceedings for fraud were brought against him by the Board. Edward Bond; Co-opted 15 June 1882.	Frances Hastings
Tower Hamlets (5 seats)	Edward North Buxton	Edward North Buxton	Edward North Buxton
Tower Hamlets (5 seats)	Rev. Angelo Lucas	Lt.Col Lenox Prendergast	Lt.Col Lenox Prendergast
Westminster (5 seats)	Sydney Buxton	Sydney Buxton	Sir Arthur Hobhouse; Resigned 31 January 1884. Hugh Edward Hoare; Co-opted 6 March 1884.
Westminster (5 seats)	George Potter	George Potter	Edward Bibbins Aveling; Resigned. Sir Richard Temple, Bt. Co-opted 6 November 1884.
Westminster (5 seats)	Lt.Col. Dawson Cornelius Greene	Rev. Brymer Belcher	Rev. Brymer Belcher
Westminster (5 seats)	Henry Danby Seymour; Died 4 August 1877; George Charles Brodrick; Co-opted 24 October 1877.	James Ross	James Ross
Westminster (5 seats)	Charles Donaldson-Hudson	Edith Jemima Simcox	James Samuel Burroughes

== Divisions 1885–1904 ==
For the elections of 1885 the existing Lambeth Division was divided into two:

- Lambeth, East (4 seats): the parishes of Camberwell and Newington, London, and corresponding to the parliamentary constituencies of Camberwell North, Camberwell Dulwich, Camberwell, Peckham, Newington, Walworth, Newington West.
- Lambeth, West (6 seats): the parish of Lambeth and the Wandsworth District (Battersea, Clapham, Putney, Streatham, Tooting Graveney and Wandsworth.)

The numbers of elected members increased to fifty-five.

== Members 1885–1897 ==
Division	Members 1885–1888	Members 1888–1891	Members 1891–1894	Members 1894–1897
City of London (4 seats)	Henry Spicer	Rev. William Martin	Walter Henry Key	Walter Henry Key
City of London (4 seats)	Alderman Joseph Savory	Albert Rutson Died 21 April 1890. Alderman Joseph Savory; Co-opted 3 July 1890. Elected Lord Mayor of London in November 1890.	Sir Joseph Savory	Patrick Herbert White
City of London (4 seats)	Rosamond Davenport Hill	Rosamond Davenport Hill	Rosamond Davenport Hill	Rosamond Davenport Hill
City of London (4 seats)	Sir Richard Temple MP	Sir Richard Temple MP	Sir Richard Temple MP Resigned; Duke of Newcastle; Co-opted 25 October 1894.	Duke of Newcastle
Chelsea (5 seats)	George White	Rev. George William Gent	Thomas Huggett	Thomas Huggett
Chelsea (5 seats)	Rev. Robert Eyton	Rev. Prebendary Robert Eyton	John Athelstan Laurie Riley	John Athelstan Laurie Riley
Chelsea (5 seats)	William Bousfield	John Henry Chapman	Frederick Davies	Frederick Davies
Chelsea (5 seats)	Professor John Hall Gladstone	Professor John Hall Gladstone	Professor John Hall Gladstone	Emma Knox Maitland
Chelsea (5 seats)	Mrs. Augusta Webster	George White	George White	Viscount Morpeth
Finsbury (6 seats)	Rev. Mark Wilks	Alfred George Cook	George Benson Clough	George Benson Clough
Finsbury (6 seats)	William Roston Bourke	William Roston Bourke	William Roston Bourke	William Roston Bourke
Finsbury (6 seats)	Benjamin Lucraft	Benjamin Lucraft; Resigned November 1890. George Shipton; Co-opted 18 December 1890.	Thomas Smith	Canon Arthur John Ingram
Finsbury (6 seats)	Rev. William Panckridge; Resigned 1887. Hon. Conrad Adderly Dillon; Co-opted to fill vacancy, 26 May 1887.	Rev. John Henry Rose	Margaret Anne Eve	Margaret Anne Eve
Finsbury (6 seats)	James Wilson Sharp	James Wilson Sharp	James Wilson Sharp	James Wilson Sharp
Finsbury (6 seats)	Thomas Francis Stonelake	Charles Augustus Vansittart Conybeare MP Conybeare was imprisoned in July 1889 under the Criminal Law and Procedure (Ireland) Act, 1887. His seat was declared vacant 27 October 1890. Rev. Robert Henry Hadden; Co-opted 20 November 1890.	James John Stockall	Richard Bartram; Died 7 December 1895. Charles Philips Trevelyan; Co-opted 27 February 1896.
Greenwich (4 seats)	Edwin Hughes	George Collins Died 24 April 1891. Rev. John Wilson; Co-opted 13 June 1891.	Rev. John Wilson	Rev. John Wilson
Greenwich (4 seats)	William Phillips	Leicester Paul Beaufort Resigned January 1889; Rev. Richard Rhodes Bristow; Co-opted 21 February 1889	Canon Richard Rhodes Bristow	Canon Richard Rhodes Bristow
Greenwich (4 seats)	Henry Gover	Henry Gover	Henry Gover	Henry Gover; Died 25 March 1895. George Septimus Warmington; Co-opted 9 May 1895.
Greenwich (4 seats)	Rev. Richard Rhodes Bristow	Rev. John Garraway Holmes; Resigned; Rev. William Blackmore; Co-opted 17 October 1889.	Rev. William Blackmore	Rev. William Blackmore
Hackney (5 seats)	John Lobb	John Lobb	John Lobb	Graham Wallas
Hackney (5 seats)	Charles Deacon	Rev. William Cuff	John Charles Horobin	John Charles Horobin
Hackney (5 seats)	James Hart	James Hart	Francis Howse	Gerard Yorke Twisleton Wykeham Fiennes; Resigned 1 July 1897. Francis Howse; Co-opted 7 October 1897.
Hackney (5 seats)	Rev. Charles George Gull	Rev. Stewart Duckworth Headlam	Rev. Stewart Duckworth Headlam	Rev. Stewart Duckworth Headlam
Hackney (5 seats)	Benjamin Smyth Olding	Rev. Benjamin Meredyth Kitson	Rev. Benjamin Meredyth Kitson	Lieutenant-Colonel Cecil John Hubbard
Lambeth East (4 seats)	Rev. Andrew Augustus Wild Drew	Rev. George Buchanan Ryley	Rev. Andrew Augustus Wild Drew	Rev. Andrew Augustus Wild Drew
Lambeth East (4 seats)	Rev. Charles Edward Brooke	Rev. Oliver Mitchell	Lord Sandhurst Resigned; Patrick Herbert White; Co-opted 13 July 1893.	Rev. Arthur William Jephson
Lambeth East (4 seats)	Thomas Edmund Heller	John Gerard Laing	John Gerard Laing	Thomas Gautrey
Lambeth East (4 seats)	George Crispe Whiteley	George Crispe Whiteley	George Crispe Whiteley	George Crispe Whiteley
Lambeth West (6 seats)	Henry Lynn	Henry Lynn	Henry Lynn	Henry Lynn
Lambeth West (6 seats)	Henry Seymour Foster	Henry Seymour Foster	Rev. Allen Edwards jnr.	Rev. Allen Edwards jnr.
Lambeth West (6 seats)	Rev. Arthur William Jephson	Rev. Arthur William Jephson	Rev. William Hamilton	Rev. William Hamilton
Lambeth West (6 seats)	Rev. George Mollett Murphy; Died 1887; Reginald Floyser Saunders; Co-opted 13 October 1887.	Margaret Mary Dilke (Mrs. Ashton Dilke)	John Sinclair	John Sinclair
Lambeth West (6 seats)	Frederic William Lucas	Rev. Hubert Curtis	William Henry Kidson	William Henry Kidson
Lambeth West (6 seats)	James Thomas Helby	James Thomas Helby	Rev. Thomas Birkett Dover	Thomas James Macnamara
Marylebone (7 seats)	Edmund Barnes	Edmund Barnes	Edmund Barnes	Edmund Barnes
Marylebone (7 seats)	James Russell Endean	Hon. Edward Lyulph Stanley	Hon. Edward Lyulph Stanley	Hon. Edward Lyulph Stanley
Marylebone (7 seats)	Rev. John James Coxhead	Rev. John James Coxhead	Rev. John James Coxhead	Rev. John James Coxhead
Marylebone (7 seats)	Major General Francis John Moberly	Major General Francis John Moberly	Major General Francis John Moberly	Major General Francis John Moberly
Marylebone (7 seats)	Joseph Robert Diggle	Joseph Robert Diggle	Joseph Robert Diggle	Joseph Robert Diggle
Marylebone (7 seats)	Rev. Canon William Barker	Herbert Henry Raphael	Sir William Cameron Gull	Rev. Dr. Joseph Angus; Resigned 10 March 1897. Alfred James Shepheard; Co-opted 11 March 1897.
Marylebone (7 seats)	Alice Westlake	Emma Knox Maitland	Rev. Charles John Ridgeway	Evelyn Cecil
Southwark (4 seats)	Sir John Bennett	Father Edmund Buckley	Father Edmund Buckley	Thomas Henry Flood
Southwark (4 seats)	Edric Bayley	Edric Bayley	John Molesworth Thomas Dumphreys	John Molesworth Thomas Dumphreys
Southwark (4 seats)	Rev. Charles d'Aguilar Lawrence	Rev. Charles d'Aguilar Lawrence; Retired; Rev. William Arthur Corbett. Co-opted 21 November 1889.	Rev. John Charles Carlile	Rev. John Charles Carlile
Southwark (4 seats)	Rev. William Lees Bell	Rev. William Copeland Bowie	Rev. William Copeland Bowie	Rev. William Copeland Bowie
Tower Hamlets (5 seats)	Edward North Buxton	Annie Besant	Mrs Ruth Homan	Mrs Ruth Homan
Tower Hamlets (5 seats)	Rev. William Parkinson Jay	Rev. William Parkinson Jay Resigned; Sir Philip Magnus; Co-opted 25 January 1890	George Lewis Bruce	George Lewis Bruce
Tower Hamlets (5 seats)	Colonel Lenox Prendergast	Colonel Lenox Prendergast	Rev. Rowland Taylor Plummer	Rev. Rowland Taylor Plummer
Tower Hamlets (5 seats)	Rev. John Fletcher Porter	Sir Edmund Hay Currie; Resigned Rev. John Fletcher Porter; Co-opted 24 April 1890.	Rev. Edward Schnadhorst	Rev. Edward Schnadhorst
Tower Hamlets (5 seats)	Frederick Joseph White Dellow	Frederick Joseph White Dellow	Cyril Jackson	Cyril Jackson; Resigned 8 November 1896. Sir Charles Alfred Elliott; Co-opted 12 November 1896.
Westminster (5 seats)	Harry Nelson Bowman Spink	Harry Nelson Bowman Spink	Harry Nelson Bowman Spink; Resigned; Alice Mary Wright (Mrs Frank Loftus Wright); Co-opted 13 July 1893.	Rev. Arnold Whitaker Oxford
Westminster (5 seats)	Rev. William Macdonald Sinclair	Rev. Arnold Whitaker Oxford	David Laing	David Laing
Westminster (5 seats)	James Ross Died July 1886; Sir William Guyer Hunter; Co-opted 14 October 1886. Hunter resigned 19 April 1888. Major General Charles Alexander Sim; Co-opted 17 May 1888	Major General Charles Alexander Sim	Major General Charles Alexander Sim	Major General Charles Alexander Sim; Resigned 15 July 1897. David Hope Kyd; Co-opted 7 October 1897.
Westminster (5 seats)	Clifford Probyn	Rev. Arthur Gerald Bowman	Lord Colchester	Captain Charles Lancelot Andrewes Skinner
Westminster (5 seats)	James Samuel Burroughes	William Winnett	William Winnett	William Winnett

== Members 1897–1904 ==
Division	Members 1897–1900	Members 1900–1904
City of London (4 seats)	George Granville Leveson-Gower; Resigned Francis William Buxton; Elected in his place 19 October 1899.	Francis William Buxton
City of London (4 seats)	Walter Henry Key	Walter Henry Key
City of London (4 seats)	Ellen Courtauld McKee	Thomas Henry Brooke-Hitching
City of London (4 seats)	Canon Arthur John Ingram	Rev. Prebendary Arthur John Ingram; Resigned; Hon. Rupert Guinness; Co-opted 20 March 1902.
Chelsea (5 seats)	Thomas Huggett; Died 30 November 1899. Hon. Frederic John Napier Thesiger; Elected in his place 25 January 1900.	Hon. Frederic John Napier Thesiger
Chelsea (5 seats)	William Whitaker Thompson; Unseated on petition and following a recount of votes, 11 February 1898; Leslie Martin Johnson; Declared elected following recount 11 February 1898. Resigned; Alfred Russell Fordham; Elected in his place 12 October 1899.	William Whitaker Thompson
Chelsea (5 seats)	Frederick Davies	Rev. Prebendary Ernest Augustus Eardley-Wilmot
Chelsea (5 seats)	Emma Knox Maitland	Emma Knox Maitland; Resigned; Edith H Glover; Co-opted 22 January 1903
Chelsea (5 seats)	Viscount Morpeth	Sydney Black; Resigned; Reginald Bray; Co-opted 28 May 1903†
Finsbury (6 seats)	Charles Bowden	Rev. Eric Maurice Farrar; Resigned; James Rowlands; Co-opted 22 October 1903
Finsbury (6 seats)	Eugenie Dibdin	Eugenie Dibdin
Finsbury (6 seats)	William Lygon, Earl Beauchamp; Resigned 18 March 1899. Anthony John Mundella; Elected in his place 23 March 1899.	Anthony John Mundella
Finsbury (6 seats)	Margaret Anne Eve	Margaret Anne Eve
Finsbury (6 seats)	James Wilson Sharp	James Wilson Sharp
Finsbury (6 seats)	Rev. John Henry Rose; Died 28 April 1898. Rev. Richard Frederick Hosken; Elected in his place 23 June 1898.	Rev. Richard Frederick Hosken
Greenwich (4 seats)	Rev. John Wilson	Rev. John Wilson; Resigned; Edward Pascoe Williams; Co-opted 6 March 1902
Greenwich (4 seats)	Mary Bridges-Adams	Mary Bridges-Adams
Greenwich (4 seats)	George Septimus Warmington	Edward Aubrey Hastings Jay
Greenwich (4 seats)	Rev. Francis Storer Clark	Rev. Francis Storer Clark
Hackney (5 seats)	Graham Wallas	Graham Wallas†
Hackney (5 seats)	Honnor Morten	Howard Angus Kennedy; Resigned; Rev. William Copeland Bowie; Co-opted 2 April 1903.
Hackney (5 seats)	William Clive Bridgeman	William Clive Bridgeman†
Hackney (5 seats)	Rev. Stewart Duckworth Headlam	Rev. Stewart Duckworth Headlam
Hackney (5 seats)	John Lobb	Earl of Shaftesbury; Resigned; Howard Willmott Liversidge; Co-opted 5 December 1901
Lambeth East (4 seats)	Henry Cubitt Gooch	Henry Cubitt Gooch
Lambeth East (4 seats)	Rev. Arthur William Jephson	Rev. Arthur William Jephson†
Lambeth East (4 seats)	Thomas Gautrey	Thomas Gautrey†
Lambeth East (4 seats)	George Crispe Whiteley	George Crispe Whiteley
Lambeth West (6 seats)	Mark Mayhew	Rev. James Hughes; Resigned; Percy Alden; Co-opted 5 March 1903.
Lambeth West (6 seats)	Rev. Allen Edwards jnr.	Rev. Allen Edwards jnr.
Lambeth West (6 seats)	Rev. William Hamilton	Rev. William Hamilton; Died; Beaumont Moore Morice; Co-opted 1 December 1902.
Lambeth West (6 seats)	John Sinclair	John Sinclair; Resigned 19 December 1901 Joseph Seymour Bartlett; Co-opted 23 January 1902.
Lambeth West (6 seats)	William Henry Kidson; Died 24 March 1900; Lieutenant-Colonel the Hon. Cecil Hubbard; Co-opted 3 May 1900	Samuel Cresswell
Lambeth West (6 seats)	Thomas James Macnamara	Thomas James Macnamara
Marylebone (7 seats)	Edmund Barnes	Edmund Barnes†
Marylebone (7 seats)	Hon. Edward Lyulph Stanley	Hon. Edward Lyulph Stanley
Marylebone (7 seats)	Henry Russell Wakefield	Rev. Ernest Stafford Smith; Resigned October 1902. Richard Bissell Prosser; Co-opted 6 November 1902.
Marylebone (7 seats)	Major General Francis John Moberly; Died 26 January 1898. William Whitaker Thompson; Elected in his place 10 March 1898.	Susan Lawrence
Marylebone (7 seats)	John Archibald Murray MacDonald	John Archibald Murray MacDonald; Resigned; Arthur B Russell; Co-opted 23 January 1902.†
Marylebone (7 seats)	Alfred James Shepheard	Hilda Caroline Miall Smith
Marylebone (7 seats)	Evelyn Cecil; Resigned 27 February 1899. John Cator; Co-opted in his place 2 March 1899. Resigned July 1900. William Montagu Graham-Harrison; Co-opted 11 October 1900.	William Montagu Graham-Harrison; Resigned; Earl of Donoughmore; Co-opted 12 April 1903. Resigned on appointment to government October 1903; John Thomas Taylor; Co-opted 26 November 1903.
Southwark (4 seats)	Rev William Francis Brown	Rev William Francis Brown
Southwark (4 seats)	John Molesworth Thomas Dumphreys	John Molesworth Thomas Dumphreys
Southwark (4 seats)	John Scott Lidgett	John Scott Lidgett
Southwark (4 seats)	Rev. William Copeland Bowie	Honnor Morten; Resigned; James Pascall; Co-opted 19 June 1902
Tower Hamlets (5 seats)	Mrs Ruth Homan	Mrs Ruth Homan
Tower Hamlets (5 seats)	Benjamin Francis Conn Costelloe; Died 22 December 1899. Father Francis Cotter Beckley; Elected in his place 1 February 1900.	Father Francis Cotter Beckley
Tower Hamlets (5 seats)	Ernest Francis Swan Flower MP	George Lewis Bruce
Tower Hamlets (5 seats)	Rev. Edward Schnadhorst	Rev. Edward Schnadhorst
Tower Hamlets (5 seats)	Sir Charles Alfred Elliott	Sir Charles Alfred Elliott
Westminster (5 seats)	Hubert M Morgan-Browne	Sydney Gedge
Westminster (5 seats)	Constance Elder (married Rev. Charles Robert Patey in 1898 and known as Mrs. Patey thereafter); Resigned; Hon. Agnes Maude Lawrence; Elected in her place 22 June 1899.	Hon. Agnes Maude Lawrence
Westminster (5 seats)	David Hope Kyd	Viscount Morpeth; Resigned; John Gerald Ritchie; Co-opted 23 January 1902
Westminster (5 seats)	Major Charles Lancelot Andrewes Skinner	Major Charles Lancelot Andrewes Skinner
Westminster (5 seats)	William Winnett	Clement Young Sturge

† Elected to the London County Council on 5 March 1904.
