= Elizabeth Surr =

19th-century British educational reformer

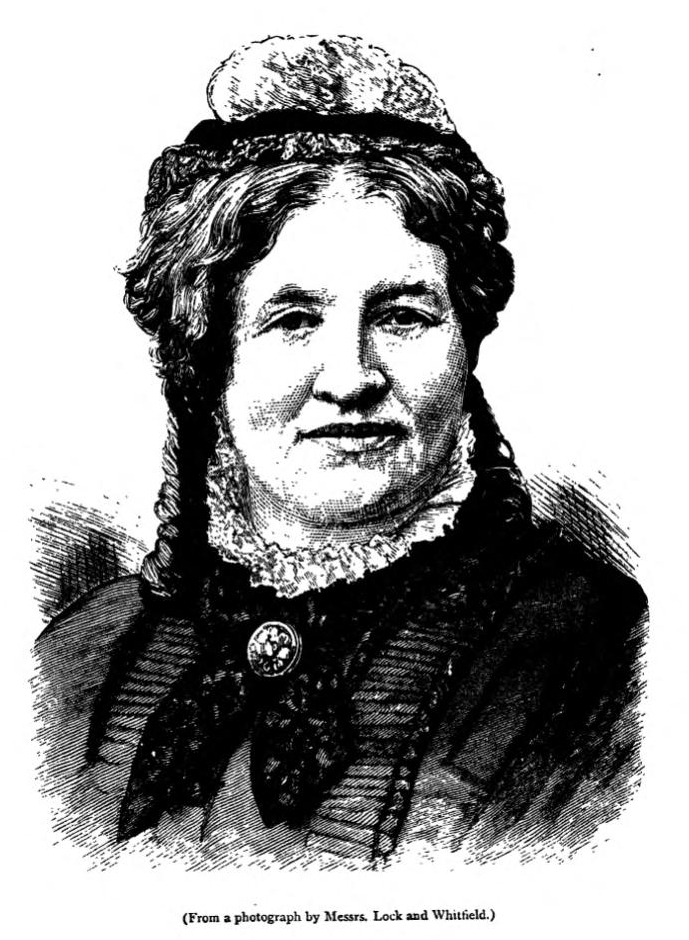
- Born: 1820; Rochford
- Died: 1901 (aged 80–81); California
- Occupation: activist
- Writing career
- Subjects: children's books and exposure of mistreatment

Elizabeth Surr (1820 – 1901) was a British educational reformer. She was successful in getting elected to the London School Board where she led the exposure of mistreatment of children in industrial schools.

== Early life ==
Surr was born in Rochford, Essex. She was one of at least eleven children born to Sarah (born Fry) and John Grabham. She had at least three sisters and four of her brothers went into medicine including George Wallington Grabham and Michael Comport Grabham. Elizabeth married a silk manufacturer named Joseph Surr on 26 October 1852 and they had at least four children.

== London School Board activism ==
Surr was one of the women who put themselves forward as candidates for the London School Board (LSB). The LSB, at the time of its creation in 1870 had one of the broadest mandates of any elected body in Britain. Unusually, women were permitted to vote on the same terms as men for the school boards and also to stand for election. She came fourth of the six members required for Finsbury in London, where she campaigned emphasising that girl students needed support from women and that the students should receive a non-denominational bible class. Four years later she stood again for election and came first and served on the LSB industrial schools' committee, at first named the "incorrigible truants committee". In 1876, Florence Fenwick Miller, Helen Taylor and Alice Westlake also won election.

In 1877 Surr published a children's book Good Out of Evil. She had written some children's books before. In 1882 she published Stories about Cats.

=== Industrial school scandal ===
Surr campaigned over a number of years against the handling by Thomas Urquhart Scrutton (1828–1896) of London School Board issues. Three of those were Upton House, expenditure on a training ship Shaftesbury moored on the River Thames, and the St Paul's Industrial School allegations. Of these the last proved most damaging to Scrutton's reputation. Upton House was a truant school, whose establishment Surr opposed, with concerns about the pupils' welfare.

Surr was assisted by board members Helen Taylor and Florence Fenwick Miller in bringing to public notice in 1881 certain scandals at St Paul's Industrial School, after a fire there: both Surr and Taylor were Board-appointed Visitors at the school. As a consequence, Home Secretary Sir William Harcourt ordered the school to be closed, and set up an inquiry. That inquiry came to nothing, however, finding a lack of evidence. The board's own discussions of the matter showed up internal divisions, with an "official group" led by Scrutton and Edward North Buxton, who were Liberal Party supporters, confronted by Surr's "independent" group of radical reformers backed by Helen Taylor and Florence Fenwick Miller. Its investigating committee failed to inspire confidence in Benjamin Lucraft and Edith Simcox, who refused to serve on it, considering it was packed with Scrutton's supporters. Surr used the hearing of the arson case brought against the school's pupils in November 1881 to publicise the way the school was run. Scrutton resigned late in 1881 as chairman of the board's Industrial Schools Committee, where he was succeeded by Henry Spicer.

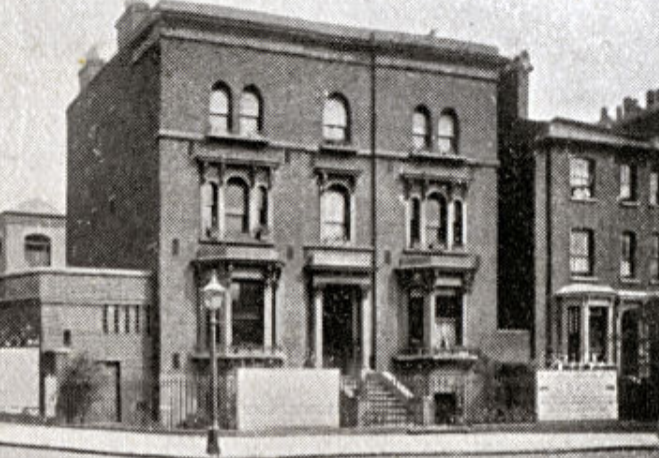
St Paul's Children's Home, Limehouse, 1903 photograph, (by then renamed as Leopold House)

Scrutton was a wealthy shipowner, a founder of Mill Hill School, and a supporter of ragged schools. He was elected to the London School Board in 1870, and was interested in industrial schools for boys who were truants or criminals. The Industrial Schools Act 1857 created a class of boarding schools designed to provide care and vocational education for certain groups of deprived children. The LSB had to deal with truancy, as evidenced by its Special Committee on Incorrigible Truants, on which Surr sat. This committee became the Industrial Schools Committee.

In 1873 Scrutton founded St Paul's Industrial School for Boys in Burdett Road, Limehouse, London, and was the designated manager in its certification in February of that year. He played a continuing role in its management: its founding board included also the philanthropist Edmund Hay Currie, and the ragged school proponent John McGregor, but Scrutton was the only active manager from some point in the later 1870s. Scrutton was therefore implicated in allegations that funds intended for the boys' food were diverted to the staff, that the boys were not eating well and nor were they clothed properly, and that there was a history of excessive punishments, including manacles and handcuffs. The school's governor, John Hinchliffe, received payment from Scrutton, per boy: the sum was considered too small by Surr and Taylor, who uncovered evidence of malversation of funds for food and clothing, and the diet contained little meat.

=== Aftermath of the scandal ===
In June 1882, Scrutton brought a successful action for libel against Helen Taylor, who had accused him, in a letter to a board member, of accepting money for the industrial school on false pretences, and blamed him for deaths of boys there. The court case involved top barristers, but the judge Sir Henry Hawkins was unhappy with its conduct and the way Edward Clarke defending raised issues on the school's management. He also stated that a Royal Commission would probably have been better than Harcourt's inquiry, for those issues.

In fact a Royal Commission had been set up in March 1882, chaired by Henry Bruce, 1st Baron Aberdare, to enquire into "the condition of the certified reformatories, industrial schools, and day industrial schools of the United Kingdom"; and it reported in 1883. Aberdare asked in the House of Lords in 1888 when the government would act on the report by legislating.

Taylor was required to pay Scrutton £1,000, but was also exonerated by the judge from any personal malice. Scrutton later resigned as a member of the London School Board.

== Later life ==
In 1893 Surr and her family moved to San Diego and it did not go well. Surr's family found it difficult to make a living and Surr had a fall. Surr and Helen Taylor's friendship continued by letter and Helen sent some money to assist. The correspondence stopped in 1898. Her son Howard became a lawyer in San Bernardino and she died in 1901.

(An 80-year-old Joseph Surr who had been on the London School Board (allegedly) married in Coronado in 1904).
