= Thomas Bowman Stephenson =

British Methodist minister

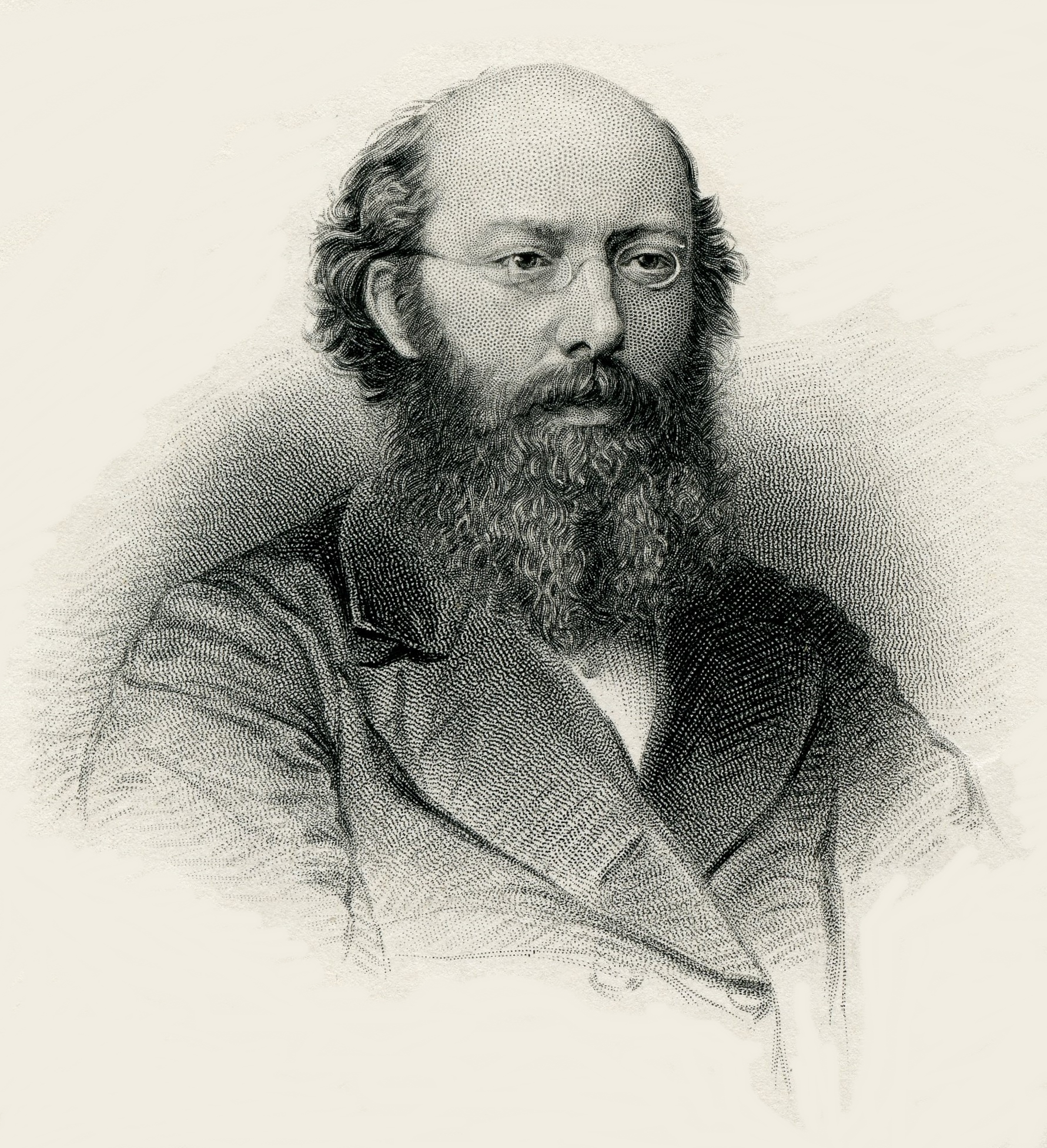
- Rev. Thomas Bowman Stephenson

President of the Methodist Conference
- In office 1891–1892
- Preceded by: William Fiddian Moulton
- Succeeded by: James Harrison Rigg

Personal details
- Born: 22 December 1839
- Died: 6 July 1912 (aged 72)
- Occupation: Methodist minister

Thomas Bowman Stephenson ( 22 December 1839 – 6 July 1912) was a Wesleyan Methodist minister and philanthropist who founded children's homes and the charity now called Action for Children. He also founded an order of deaconesses.

== Early life ==
He was born in Newcastle upon Tyne, and attended King Edward VI Grammar School, Louth and Wesley College, Sheffield.

== Career ==
He founded what was to become the National Children's Home in 1869. He later founded the Wesleyan Deaconesses in 1890. In 1891 he was elected President of the Methodist Conference. He was a member of the London School Board. From 1902 to 1907 he was warden of the Methodist Deaconess Training College at Ilkley, West Yorkshire.

He retired in 1907 and died in London on 6 July 1912. He is buried in City of London Cemetery.
