= Marian Andrews =

English biographer and novelist

One of Marian Andrews' biographies, of Isabella I of Spain

Marian Andrews (née Hare, 1839 – 1929) was a biographer and novelist who published under the pseudonym Christopher Hare. She wrote stories set in rural Wiltshire, followed by historical fiction and biographies of fifteenth- and sixteenth-century figures, especially women, complaining that "all serious consideration was reserved for the men of the period" among other historians.

== Life ==
Marian was born Mary Ann Hare in Brompton, London, on 24 February 1839, the eldest child of lawyer Thomas Hare and his wife Mary, née Samson. Her three sisters were the artist Alice Westlake, Katherine Clayton and Lydia Mary Clayton (the latter two married a pair of Clayton brothers). Along with Marian, Alice and Katherine were signatories of the 1866 petition for women's suffrage. Alice and Katherine served on the central committee of the National Society for Women's Suffrage, and Katherine campaigned for girls’ education and raised funds for a memorial to Katherine of Aragon. Their four brothers were Sherlock, Herbert, Albert, and Lancelot Hare, lieutenant-governor of Bengal.

The family settled in Surrey, where Marian and her sisters were educated at home. On 26 November 1861, she married Rev. William Ryton Andrews, a clergyman and amateur geologist. His work took them to Sussex, to Middlesex, and from 1873 to 1892 to Teffont Evias, Wiltshire, where her first stories were set. Her fictional village setting is modeled on her husband's parish, and shows a sympathetic understanding of his parishioner's lives including the interiors of cottages, folk customs, and the local workhouse.

From 1904, Marian began publishing biographies of Renaissance-era figures under her pseudonym, researching them from primary documents including published state papers and letters. Many of her works are set in Italy, which she visited every year. Her subjects included Isabella of Castile, Marguerite of Austria, Isabella of Milan, and Giulia Gonzaga. She also wrote a work following Dante Alighieri's travels in Italy in exile, pursuing her interest in early Protestant reformers, which she considered Dante to be.

Their sons were Launcelot William Andrews, a medical practitioner, who died in 1895 aged 31, and Arthur Westlake Andrews, a geographer and mountaineer who reached the Wimbledon semi-finals in tennis. In later life, Marian settled in Eastbourne, Sussex with her husband and their daughter, Marian Elizabeth Andrews (died 1977).

== Works ==
=== Fiction ===
- Down the Village Street: Scenes in a West Country Hamlet. William Blackwood & Sons, London 1895.
- As We Sow: A West Country Drama. Osgood, McIlvaine & Co., London 1897.
- Broken Arcs: A West Country Chronicle. Harper, London 1898.
- How Cynthia Went a-Maying: A Romance of Long Ago Wherein the Siege of Wardour Castle is Truly Chronicled. Isbister, London 1901.
- The Life Story of Dinah Kellow. Ward, Lock & Co., London, 1901.
- Felicita: A Romance of Old Siena. Harper & Brothers, London 1904.
- In the Straits of Time: A Romance of Old France. Cassell, London 1904.

=== History and biography ===
- The Most Illustrious Ladies of the Italian Renaissance. Harper & Brothers, London 1904.
- Dante the Wayfarer. Harper & Brothers, London 1905.
- A Queen of Queens (Isabel of Castile) & the Making of Spain [1451–1555]. Harper & Brothers, London 1906.
- The High and Puissant Princess Marguerite of Austria: Princess Dowager of Spain: Duchess Dowager of Savoy: Regent of the Netherlands. Harper & Brothers, London 1907.
- The Life of Louis XI, the Rebel Dauphin and the Statesman King, from his orig. Letters and other Documents. Harper & Brothers, London 1907.
- Courts & Camps of the Italian Renaissance: Being a Mirror of the Life and Times of the Ideal Gentleman Count Baldassare Castiglione. Harper & Brothers, London 1907.
- The Romance of a Medici Warrior: Being the Story of Giovanni delle Bande Nere. A Study in Heredity. Paul, London 1910.
- Isabella of Milan, Princess d'Aragona, and Wife of Duke Gian Galeazzo Sforza. Harper & Brothers, London 1911.
- Charles de Bourbon, High Constable of France, "The Great Condottiere" John Lane, New York 1911.
- The Story of Bayard. Retold from the Old Chronicles of the Loyal Servitor and others. J.M. Dent & Sons, London 1911.
- A Princess of the Italian Reformation, Giulia Gonzaga, 1513–1566, Her Family and Her Friends. Harper & Brothers, London 1912.
- Maximilian the Dreamer, Holy Roman Emperor, 1459–1519. Stanley Paul & Co., London 1913.
- Men and Women of the Italian Reformation. Stanley Paul & Co., London 1914.
- Life and Letters in the Italian Renaissance. Stanley Paul & Co., London 1915.
- A Great Emperor, Charles V, 1519–1558. Stanley Paul & Co., London 1917.
