= Woodford Parish Championship =

Defunct tennis tournament
- Tour: Mens Amateur Tour (1877-1912)
- Founded: 1880
- Abolished: 1883
- Location: Woodford Parish, Essex, England
- Venue: Woodford Parish Cricket club (1880-1882)
- Surface: outdoor (grass)

The Woodford Parish Championship was an early Victorian era men's grass court tennis tournament usually staged in the first week of July annually. It first established in 1880 at Woodford Parish, Essex, England which ran for only four editions until 1883.

== History ==
The Woodford Parish Championship was an early 19th century tennis event first staged in the first week of July 1880 at Woodford Parish, Essex, England. The first winner of the men's singles was Edward North Buxton (he also competed at the 1879 and 1880 Wimbledon Championships). In 1881 the championship was staged again, with the final taking place at Knighton, Essex, and was won by Edward Buxton. The final known edition was in July 1882, and was again won by Gerald Buxton (the brother of Edward North Buxton). It was a featured regular series event on the Mens Amateur Tour (1877-1912)

== Finals ==
=== Men's Singles ===
Year	Winner	Runner-up	Score
1880	(England) Edward North Buxton	(England) ?	
1881	(England) Edward North Buxton	(United Kingdom) F.E. Deck	6–4, 6–4
1882	(England) Gerald Buxton	(England) Edward North Buxton	6–0, 6–2
