= Thomas Hare (political reformer) =

British political reformer (1806–1891)

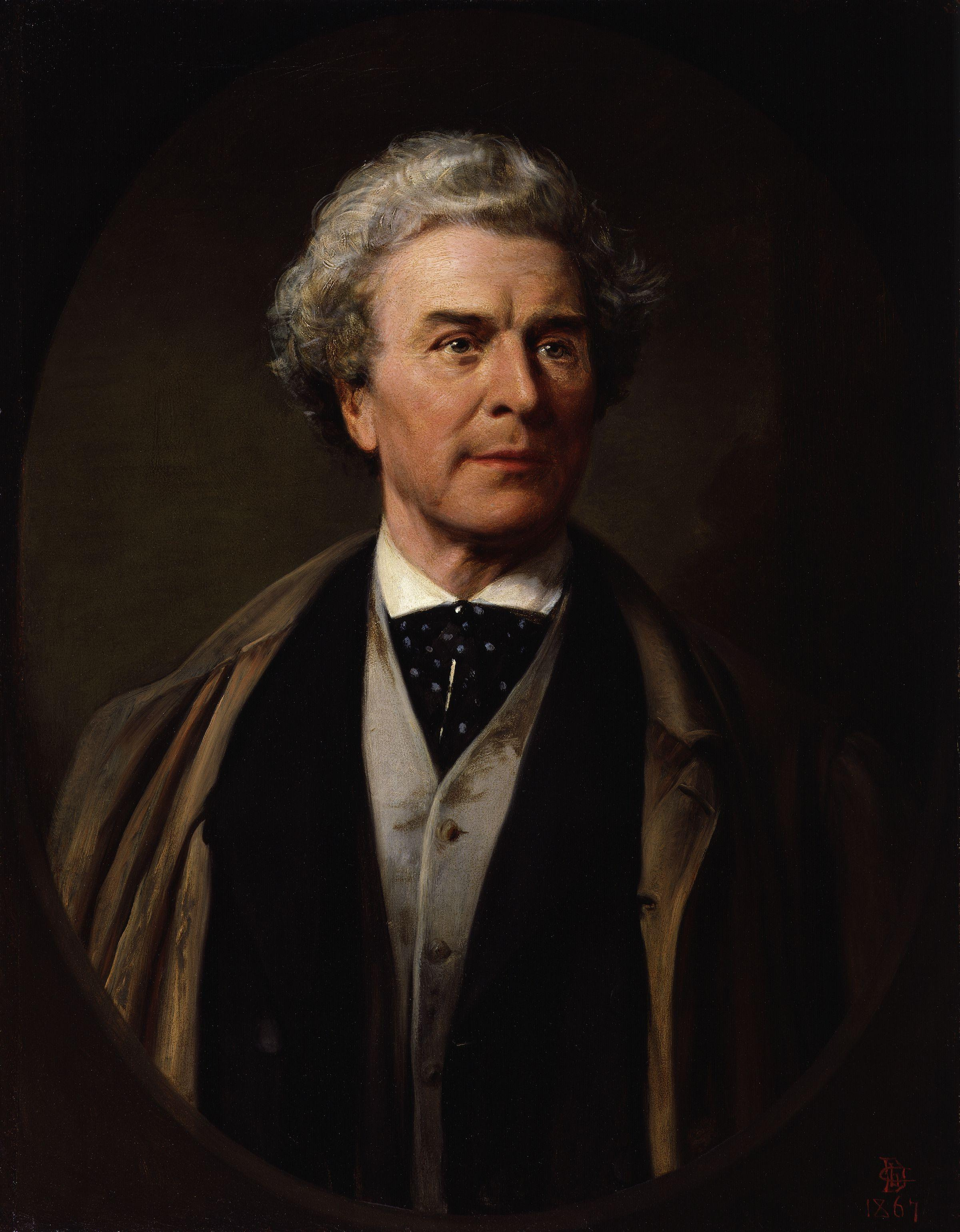
- Thomas Hare, 1867 portrait by Lowes Cato Dickinson
- Born: 28 March 1806; England
- Died: 6 May 1891 (aged 85)
- Occupations: Lawyer, political reformer
- Known for: Advocating for electoral reform

Thomas Hare (28 March 1806 – 6 May 1891) was a British lawyer and supporter of electoral reform. He is credited with inventing the single transferable vote system of proportional representation which he was a proponent and defender of and is now used in national elections in Ireland and Malta, for elections to the Australian Senate and state elections, and in city elections in Northern Ireland, the United States, New Zealand and Scotland.

== Life ==
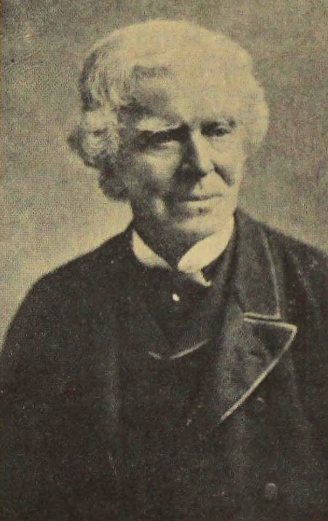
Photograph of Thomas Hare

He was born on 28 March 1806, the illegitimate son of Anne Hare of Leigh, Dorset. (Alumni Cantabrigienses considers that a 19th-century identification was incorrect. It identified Anne Hare's son with the Thomas Hare who matriculated at Queens' College, Cambridge in 1823, graduating B.A. in 1827, and M.A. in 1846.)

Brought up on a Dorset farm, Hare had a scanty education. He went to London and found work as a solicitor's clerk. On 14 November 1828 he was admitted a student of the Inner Temple, and he was called to the bar on 22 November 1833. He practiced law in the chancery courts. In 1853 Hare became an Inspector of Charities for the Charity Commission.

Hare was a member of the London-based Athenaeum Club and Political Economy Club. In 1859, he met John Stuart Mill. He was also a member of the National Association for the Promotion of Social Science, and from 1867 was on the committee of the Society for Promoting the Employment of Women. He worked with Lydia Becker on suffrage petitions. He attended the 1867 funeral of the Manchester suffragist Max Kyllmann, to support his wife Philippine Kyllmann; who two years later fell out with Becker. Under Mill's influence, Hare became involved in the co-operative movement from 1869, and joined the Land Tenure Reform Association (1869 to 1873) for "free trade in land", following the ideas of Mill and William Thomas Thornton.

== Works ==
=== Hare's STV books and support from John Stuart Mill and others ===
- The Machinery of Representation (1857)
- A Treatise on Election of Representatives, Parliamentary and Municipal (1859)
- The Election of Representatives Parliamentary and Municipal: a Treatise (1865)

Hare's major work The Machinery of Representation appeared in 1857 (two editions) and editions of his Treatise on the Election of Representatives: Parliamentary and Municipal appeared between 1859 and 1873. In these works, he presented and developed his ideas on proportional representation using ranked votes (STV).

In 1859 Mill wrote a review for Fraser's Magazine under the title "Recent Writers on Reform", calling Hare's Treatise remarkable, and noting also "Mr. Hare passes an unqualified and most just condemnation on the exclusion of women from the suffrage".

Mill in 1861 applauded Hare's thinking. In 1873 he described Hare's concept as

the greatest improvement of which the system of representative government is susceptible; an improvement which…exactly meets and cures the grand, and what before seemed inherent, defect of the representative system.

(Mill later shifted his ideas slightly, emphasizing the role of bullet voting in a multi-winner election contest (the single non-transferable vote) as a safeguard for minority groups.)

A system along lines described by Hare was publicised by Henry Fawcett in Mr. Hare's Reform Bill Simplified and Explained (1860).

Simon Sterne's 1871 book On representative government and personal representation. Based in part upon Thomas Hare's treatise, entitled "The election of representatives, parliamentary and municipal" extolled Hare's vision.

An article The Machinery of Politics and Proportional Representation from 1872 by William Robert Ware, in the American Law Review, was reprinted in London by the Representative Reform Association. This was a group of Hare's allies, set up with support from M.P. Walter Morrison. George Howell was its secretary from 1868 to 1874. The group also involved Edmond Beales. Ware's ideas were close to Hare's. Charles Lutwidge Dodgson (Lewis Carroll) built on the classification used by Ware of voting systems, in his 1884 pamphlet The Principles of Parliamentary Representation, to give a general formulation and to emphasize larger district magnitude in multi-member districts and each voter casting one vote only.

=== Law reports ===
Hare was also known in the field of law reporting. At a period without official case reports, the published reports of key court decisions allowed them to be used as precedents. From 1841 he reported on the Court of Chancery, on James Wigram's decisions as Vice-Chancellor of England. The series of 11 volumes of Reports of Cases Adjudged in the High Court of Chancery culminated in 1858 with one on cases of William Wood.

Wigram's decrees were considered lucid. Two leading judicial decisions that are still relevant are covered only in Hare's Reports in Chancery:

- Henderson v Henderson (1843) 3 Hare 100, from which the rule known as "the rule in Henderson v Henderson" is derived. (The rule provides, broadly, that when a matter becomes the subject of litigation between the parties, each party must bring their whole case before the court so that all aspects of it may be finally decided—subject, of course, to any appeal—once and for all. In the absence of special circumstances, the parties cannot later return to the court to advance arguments, claims or defences which they could have put forward for decision on the first occasion but failed to raise.)
- Foss v Harbottle (1843) 2 Hare 461, from which a rule is derived, still the cornerstone of minority shareholder rights in company law in common law legal systems over 160 years later.

Hare was a co-author, with Henry Iltid Nicholl and John Monson Carrow, of the initial 1840 and 1843 volumes of Cases Relating to Railways and Canals 1835–1840, resp. 1840–1842.

== Views ==
Initially a Conservative Party supporter, Hare was a free trader opposed to the Corn Laws. He left the Conservatives in 1846, the year of their repeal, and became a Peelite. He never joined the Liberal Party, preferring to maintain his independence. He was a devout Anglican, influenced by the Tractarians. Hare differed from Mill in relying heavily on Edmund Burke as a political authority, in particular the Reflections on the Revolution in France.

The Dictionary of National Biography article by William Prideaux Courtney on Hare states:

Hare's energies were concentrated in an attempt to devise a system which would secure proportional representation of all classes in the United Kingdom, including minorities, in the House of Commons and other electoral assemblies.

In the British context, Thomas Wright Hill had discussed the "transferable vote" concept but his idea was not widely known. His son Rowland Hill, for the South Australian Colonization Commission, took an interest during the 1830s in a reformed electoral system for the colony of South Australia and drew on his father's ideas.

Hare's interest in the issue dated from his appointment as Inspector of Charities. (Apparently the time was ripe for consideration of electoral reform - Danish thinker Carl Christoffer Georg Andræ independently developed a similar system about the same time.)

Hare's ideas intended to make political representation more closely reflect the ideals of participatory democracy, where all constituents could be heard. He argued that "personal representation" could displace the dominant "monolithic bloc" political party. Hare's original electoral system concept included each voter casting a single preferential vote in an at-large district covering the entire United Kingdom.

In the preface to the fourth edition of Treatise on the Election of Representatives, Hare stated his belief that proportional representation would "end the evils of corruption, violent discontent and restricted power of selection or voter choice". A great deal of writing on that theory developed, and societies were formed in various parts of the world for its adoption.

Hare pointed out that his scheme was not meant to bear the title "representation for minorities". In the preface to his third edition of that work, Hare had asked:

Can it be supposed that the moment the electors are allowed a freedom of choice they will immediately be seized with a desire to vote for some distant candidate with whom they are unacquainted, rather than for those whom they know – who are near to them, whose speeches they have heard and who have personal recommendations to the favour and respect of the town and neighbourhood?

== Legacy ==
Hare lends his name to the following:

- a system of proportional representation, also known as Single Transferable Vote (STV)
- a particular electoral quota known as the Hare quota

Hare's death in May 1891 occurred six years before the first use of proportional representation in Tasmania in 1897. The recognition of Hare's name in the Hare-Clark electoral system (i.e. Tasmanian system) honours his work.

The Single Transferable Vote method has been widely used for multiple-winner elections. While continuing to be the main method of elections in the Republic of Ireland and for some elections in Australia, it has been widely used in numerous corporations and organizations, and has been employed in local elections in a few jurisdictions of the United States. 2007 saw the reintroduction of STV in public elections on the British mainland in elections to Scottish local authorities. STV had been used for elections to Parliament for some University Seats from 1918 to 1945 and from 1918 to 1929 for Scottish boards.

Hare and his wife gave a font and stained glass window to St Paul's Church, Hook, London.

== Family ==
Hare was twice married.

1. Firstly, in Dorset on 7 August 1837, to Mary Samson, daughter of Thomas Samson of Kingston Russell. She died on 21 October 1855, and was buried in the churchyard of Brompton church. They had eight children.
2. Secondly, on 4 April 1872, to Eleanor Bowes Benson (1833–1890), second sister of Edward White Benson, archbishop of Canterbury.

There was one child, Mary Eleanor (1874–1883), of the second marriage. Hare was survived by seven children, and his will divided his estate equally between them, in a trust: they were three sons (Sherlock, Alfred, Lancelot) and four daughters (Marian, Alice, Katharine, Lydia Mary).

The family home was Gosbury Hill in Surrey where Hare had a farmhouse built to his own design. The place is now a street in a built-up area, in north Chessington.

Of the sons:

- Sherlock Hare (eldest son, 1840–1912) was called to the bar at the Inner Temple in 1871. He moved to Rangoon, and leased Great Coco Island from the British Raj in 1878. He set up a business to grow coconuts there, but it failed financially, leaving him with losses by 1882. He then practised the law in Rangoon. After an apparently unprovoked attack on another barrister there, John Hannay, in 1891, he was treated as insane; and deported to the United Kingdom, where he was confined in Holloway Sanatorium.
- Alfred Richard Hare was a runholder at Blackmount, Otago District, New Zealand. He married in 1882 Alice Emily Ogilvy Millar, daughter of the Rev. James Ogilvy Millar. His eldest daughter Eva married in 1914, as his second wife, her first cousin Lewis Hare Clayton.
- Lancelot Hare (1851–1922) became Lieutenant Governor of Bengal.

Herbert Thomas Hare, the second son, a civil engineer, died at Hong Kong in 1874 aged 27.

Of the daughters:

- Marian (1839–1929, eldest, birth name Mary Ann), married in 1861 the Rev. William Ryton Andrews (1834–1922), of Eastbourne. She is known as a writer under the pseudonym "Christopher Hare".
- Alice (1842–1923), suffragist, married in 1864 John Westlake. They had no children.
- Katharine (1843–1933) was a member of the Kensington Society of the 1860s. She married in 1872 the Rev. Lewis Clayton, causing her to drop suffragist activities for a time. They had three sons and a daughter. The sons were Lewis Hare Clayton (married Eva Hare above); Harold Clayton of the Indian Civil Service; and Geoffrey Clayton who became Archbishop of Cape Town.
- Lydia Mary married Charles Hoghton Clayton, brother of Lewis Clayton who had married Katharine, and was mother of the solicitor Sir Francis Hare Clayton.

== See also ==
- Hare–Clark electoral system
