= Frederick Ridgeway =

British Anglican bishop (1848–1921)

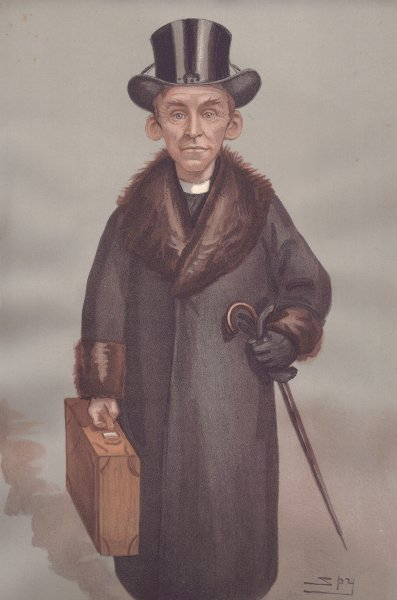
"Kensington" Ridgeway as caricatured by Spy (Leslie Ward) in Vanity Fair, February 1903

Frederick Edward Ridgeway (1848 – 4 May 1921) was an Anglican bishop from 1901 until his death 20 years later.

Frederick Edward Ridgeway was educated at Tonbridge School and Clare College, Cambridge; he was younger brother of Charles, sometime Bishop of Chichester. Ordained in 1872, he was incumbent of the Church of St Mary the Virgin, Glasgow from 1878, and was additionally Dean of the Diocese of Glasgow and Galloway from 1888 until 1890.

== Suffragan bishop ==
In 1890 he became Vicar of St Peter's, Kensington, where he served until, in October 1900, he moved to become Rector of St Botolph-without-Bishopsgate in preparation for his appointment to the episcopate as the first suffragan Bishop of Kensington the next year. He was consecrated a bishop on 17 February 1901, at St Margaret's, Westminster, by Frederick Temple, Archbishop of Canterbury. Though initially the care of the West End remained with Alfred Barry, when he retired in February 1903, the Bishop of Kensington was given those responsibilities.

== Diocesan bishop ==
From 1911 to 1921 he was Bishop of Salisbury. He took legal possession of the See by the confirmation of his election on 17 October 1911 at St Mary-le-Bow by Alfred Cripps, Vicar-General of the Province of Canterbury. He was enthroned at Salisbury Cathedral in November 1911 and served until his death in London on 4 May 1921.

Ridgeway was a strong supporter of British involvement in the First World War, and his views were clearly expressed in a sermon delivered on 9 August 1914, justifying Britain's declaration of war against Germany. ‘It was on our side a just war, it was with us a righteous war, and if it was carried out in the spirit of our Christianity it was a holy war .... It was an unprovoked war. It was an unselfish war. Make no mistake about it. There never was a more unselfish war. Nothing for England to gain: terribly much for England to lose ... nothing to be ashamed of, England stepped out reluctantly but bravely and unflinchingly into the struggle. It was a war for Righteousness. It was a solemn protest against violated pledges and ruthlessly broken undertakings.’. Ridgeway encouraged clergy to volunteer as army and navy chaplains, to provide support for the tens of thousands of soldiers in camps on Salisbury Plain and to work in Sherborne Castle, Lytchett Manor and other great houses which had been transformed ‘into the most perfect and luxurious hospitals’.

Ridgeway's handwritten letters were notorious because they were hard to decipher. He attempted to write to every family which had suffered bereavement during the War. One woman noted, ‘We have had such a beautiful letter from the Bishop, though we can’t read it’.

His older brother, Charles, was Bishop of Chichester (1908-1919).

Church of England titles
New title	Bishop of Kensington; 1901 – 1911	Succeeded by John Maud
Preceded by John Wordsworth	Bishop of Salisbury; 1911 – 1921	Succeeded by St Clair Donaldson
