= Methodist Diaconal Order =

In the Methodist Church of Great Britain, deacons (a term used for both men and women) are members of an order called the Methodist Diaconal Order (MDO). The MDO is both a religious order and an order of ministry. (Note: Methodist deacons are comparable to clerics regular in other denominations.) One distinctive feature of the Methodist ecclesiology is that a deacon has a permanent ministry and remains as a deacon – it is not a transitional step toward becoming a presbyter. (Note: In British Methodism, ordination to the presbyterate, previously called "the ministry", has always been direct, without a transitional period as a deacon, unlike many other denominations.) The diaconate is regarded as equal yet distinct from the presbyterate, but, as a religious order, it places a particular emphasis on Christian service.

As of 2024 the MDO reports to have "over 280" deacons, who follow a common Rule of Life.

== History ==
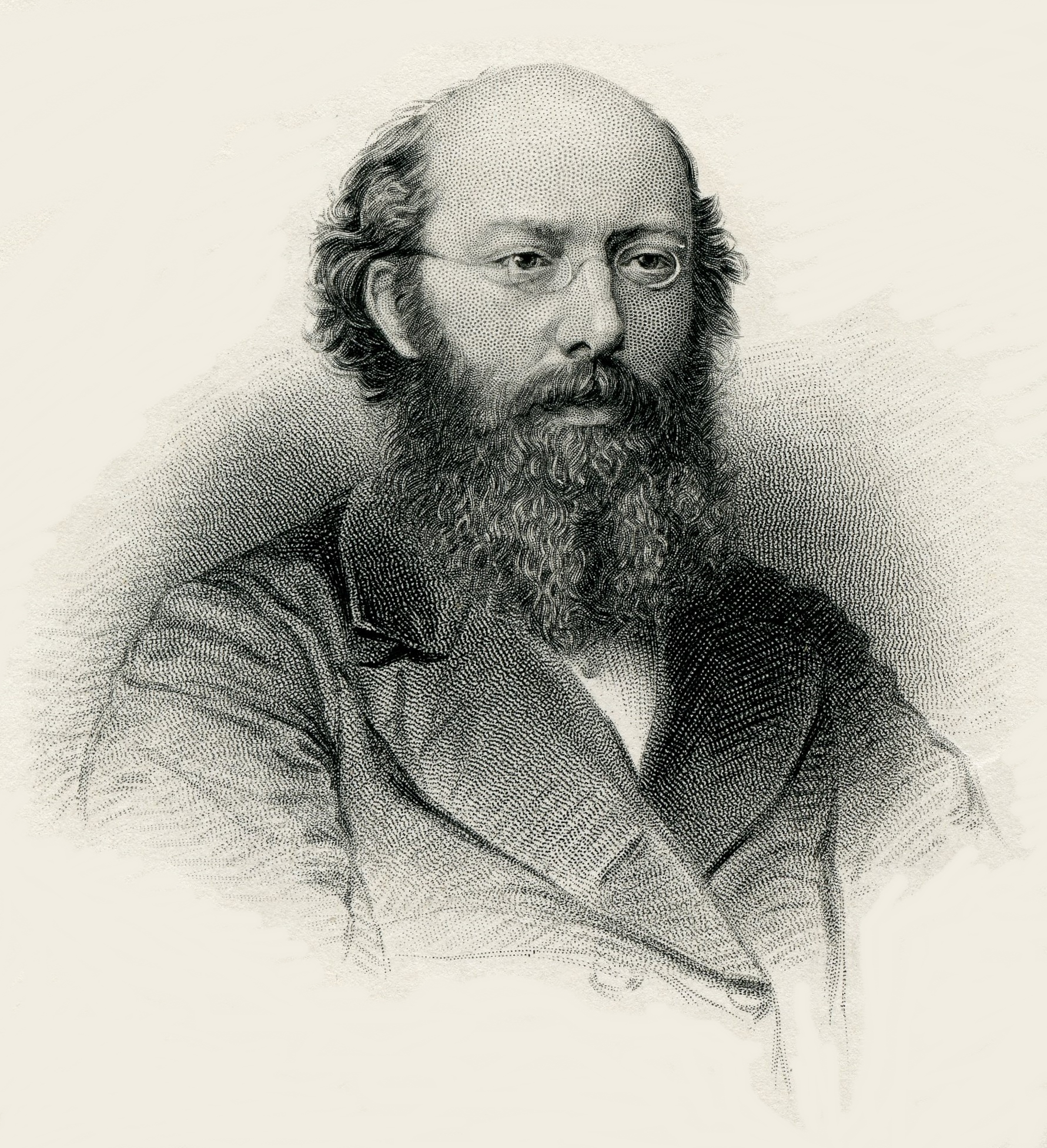
President of the Methodist Conference Thomas Bowman Stephenson founded a deaconess order

Wesleyan Deaconesses and the Wesleyan Deaconess Order were founded by the Rev. Thomas Bowman Stephenson in 1890. Stephenson saw that women had a unique role in Christian service, as they could visit homes that were inaccessible to men. They worked in association with his Children's Homes. The Deaconesses began to work overseas from 1894 following a request for a deaconess to serve in South Africa.

After Methodist Union in 1932, the Wesleyan Deaconesses were joined by the United Methodist Deaconesses and Primitive Methodist Sisters to become the Wesley Deaconess Order (WDO) of the Methodist Church.

In the 1960s, the Order decided that membership would be lifelong, ending the previous practice of leaving upon marriage. The 1973 Methodist Conference decision to open presbyteral ministry to women had a profound impact on the Order, initiating debates about its future. As a result, Conference agreed to cease recruitment for the WDO from 1978. However, there were still Methodists who believed themselves called to a diaconal ministry. Eventually in 1986 the Order was re-opened to both men and women.

In the late 20th century, the diaconate was restored as a vocational order in many Western churches, with deacons gaining recognition as equals to presbyters. Accordingly, the Methodist Conference of 1998 admitted all existing members of the renamed Methodist Diaconal Order into "full connexion"—becoming ordained to a full-time, life-long ministry. Members of the MDO gather annually for a convocation, echoing the practices of its predecessor, the WDO.

In 2018, it was reported that there were 127 deacons active, 9 student deacons, and 118 supernumerary (retired) deacons.

== Form of address ==
Formerly, deaconesses were addressed as Sister, but since the admission of men to the order, and once it became an order of ministry as well as a religious order, all members are now officially titled "Deacon". The term "deaconess" is no longer used.

== Dress and attire ==
There is no formal habit or uniform for a Methodist deacon. Some deacons may choose to wear what is regarded as 'traditional dress' for the MDO, namely a navy blue suit with a white shirt or blouse, particularly for formal occasions, while others may prefer to wear the polo shirts and sweatshirts commissioned by the MDO, particularly if the circumstances are less formal. Deacons are permitted to wear clerical shirts; however, these must be navy blue or white and deacons must wear the diaconal order pectoral cross they were presented with at their Ordination. The badge of the MDO is an important identifier for Methodist deacons.

== See also ==
- Deacon § Methodist churches
- Deaconess
