= John Charles Carlile =

The Reverend John Charles Carlile, CH, CBE (c. 1861 – 16 August 1941) was a prominent British Baptist minister, author, and journalist.

Born in London of Scottish parentage, he trained for the ministry at Spurgeon's College. He was minister of the Baptist Church on Abbey Street, Bermondsey from 1884 to 1893, in which year he was elected minister of Trinity Baptist Church, Marylebone. In 1898 he took over a congregation in Folkestone, Kent, returning to London in the 1920s. In 1921 he was elected President of the Baptist Union, and for many years was the editor of The Baptist Times. From 1891 to 1897 he was a member of the London School Board, representing Southwark.

During the First World War, Carlile went to France five times to organize lectures for troops, and was one of the original members of the United Army and Navy Board. For his war services he was appointed a CBE and decorated by the King of the Belgians. In 1929 he was appointed a Member of the Order of the Companions of Honour "for public and social services".
