= Thomas Heller (trade unionist) =

British schoolteacher and trade unionist

Thomas Edmund Heller (15 May 1837 – 17 February 1901) was a British schoolteacher and trade unionist.

Born in Bishopsteignton in Devon, Heller grew up in Cheam in Surrey, where he attended school. He followed his father in becoming a teacher, and trained under Charles Bromby at the Cheltenham Training College before taking up a teaching post in London. An enthusiast for the organisation of teachers, he was a founder member of the London Church Teachers' Association and, in 1870, the National Union of Elementary Teachers (NUET).

Heller became the full-time secretary of the NUET in 1873 and, in this role, campaigned for an end to payment by results, for improved training for teachers, with teacher training colleges to be linked to universities, and for teaching to become a profession with legal registration. He campaigned for the establishment of a pension scheme for teachers, and also edited the annual New Code for Day Schools publication. In 1874, he was elected to the London School Board.

Under Heller's leadership, the NUET became the National Union of Teachers, and membership more than doubled, from 7,000 to 18,000. He retired in 1891, following a serious illness.

Trade union offices
Preceded by William Lawson	General Secretary of the National Union of Elementary Teachers; 1873–1891	Succeeded by James Yoxall
