= Honnor Morten =

British nurse, journalist and politician (1861–1913)

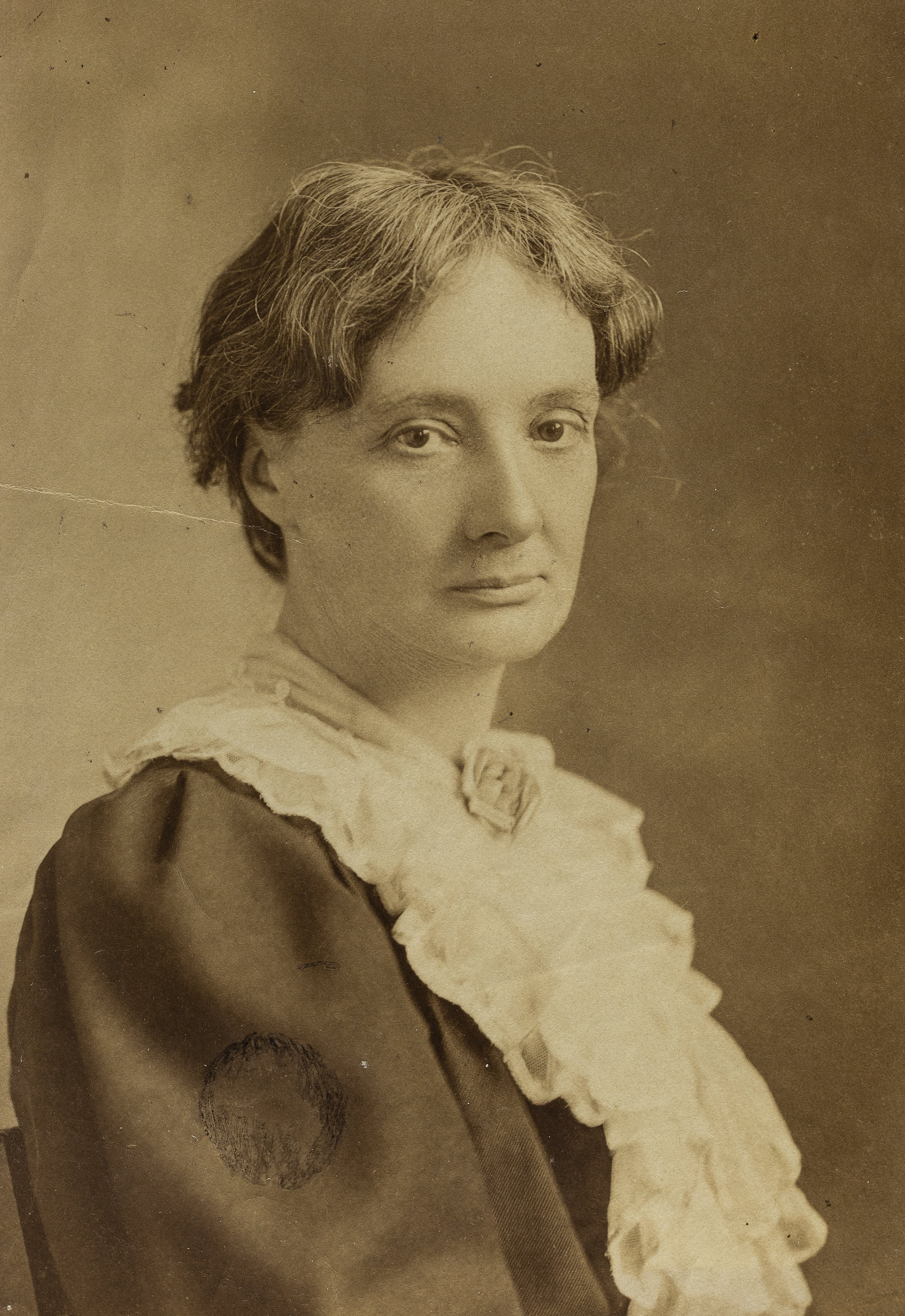
- Born: 13 November 1861
- Died: 11 July 1913 (aged 51)
- Occupations: British nurse, journalist and campaigner
- Employer: The London Hospital

Violet Honnor Morten (13 November 1861 – 11 July 1913) was a British nurse, writer, journalist and campaigner.

== Early life and education ==
Born in Cheam in Surrey to a solicitor and his wife. Her mother's brother was the Scottish writer William Black and she was a child friend of the polymath Herbert Spencer. Morten trained as paying probationer nurse for three months between 11 September 1884 and 9 December 1884, under Matron Eva Luckes at The London Hospital.

== Career ==
Later she qualified as a midwife, and in 1896 completed a course on scientific hygiene at Bedford College. In 1889, she founded the Women Writers' Club, and around this time she also founded the Association of Asylum Workers. In 1890, she and Mary Belcher founded the Nurses' Co-operation, which attempted to act as both a trade union and a co-operative guild.

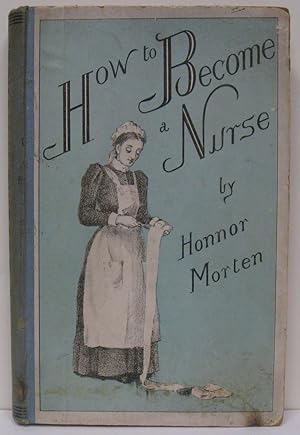
Honnor Morten's How to become a Nurse

Morten began writing articles on nursing for numerous publications, and in 1891 her influential Nurse's Dictionary of Medical Terms and Nursing Treatment was first published. This publication became a core nursing text for the next one hundred years and was regularly published in new editions with a 30th edition being published in 1992. Her text How to Become a Nurse and How to Succeed was a practical contribution to the movement for a nursing profession. It clearly set out where nurse training was offered, what it entailed and how to apply. It was useful for those considering nursing, and for nurses who wanted to progress their careers. It also included chapters on Asylum Attendants and Male Nurses.

She joined the Fabian Society in 1892, serving on its executive committee from 1895 until 1898. From 1896, she lived at the Hoxton Settlement, and the following year was elected to represent the district on the London School Board. However, following complaints about her smoking in public, she switched to represent the City of London. On the board, she campaigned for equal pay for women and school nurses, and against corporal punishment. She founded the School Nurses' Society to further her campaigns.

== Founding of Oakdene ==
In 1905, Morten moved to Rotherfield in Sussex, where she founded Oakdene, a Tolstoyan settlement, which also served as a respite home for disabled children from London. She became increasingly religious, writing The Enclosed Nun anonymously, and then St Clare under her own name.

== Women's suffrage ==
Morten supported the women's suffrage campaign, in particular the tax resistance movement, as a result of which some of her property was seized and auctioned.

== Notable publications ==
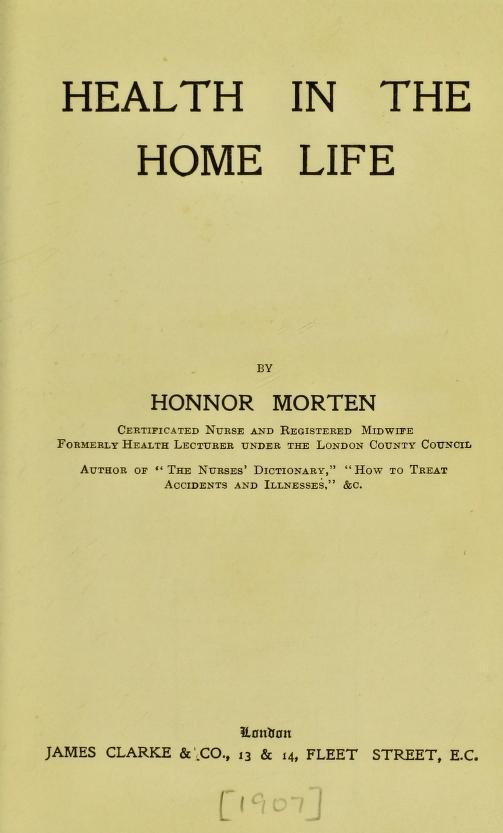
Honnor Morten's 1907 "Health in the Home Life"

- How to Become a Nurse and How to Succeed.
- How to Treat Accidents and Illnesses: a Handbook for the Home.
- Health in the Home Life.
- The Midwives Pocket-Book.
- The Nurse’s Dictionary of Medical Terms and Nursing Treatment.
- Tales from the Children’s Ward.
- Sketches of Hospital Life.
