= William Burt Pope =

English Methodist theologian (1822–1903)

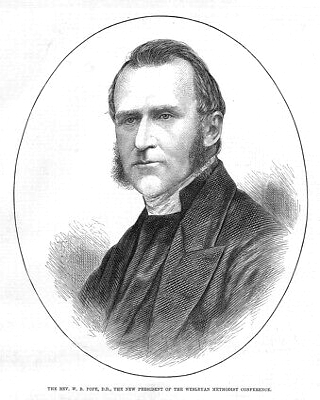
- Born: 1822; Wolfville
- Died: 1903
- Occupation: Minister
- Relatives: George Uglow Pope

William Burt Pope (19 February 1822–5 July 1903) was an English Wesleyan Methodist minister and theologian, who was president of the Methodist Conference.

== Biography ==
=== Early life ===
William Burt Pope was born at Horton, Nova Scotia, on 19 February 1822. He was the younger son of John Pope (1791–1863), Wesleyan missionary and Catherine, born Uglow, who was originally of Stratton, Cornwall. He was the younger brother of George Uglow Pope. After education at a village school at Hooe and at a secondary school at Saltash, near Plymouth, William spent a year in boyhood (1837-8) at Bedeque, Prince Edward Island, assisting an uncle, a shipbuilder and general merchant.

In 1845, he married Ann Ehza Lethbridge, daughter of a yeoman farmer of Modbury, near Plymouth. By her he had six sons, two of whom died in early life, and four daughters.

=== Career ===
Pope was accepted, in 1840, by the Methodist synod of Cornwall as a candidate for the ministry, and entered the Methodist Theological Institution at Hoxton. Ordained in 1842, he began his active ministry at Kingsbridge, Devonshire. He served for short periods at Liskeard, Jersey, Sandhurst, Dover and Halifax. He served also for longer periods at City Road, London, Hull, Manchester, Leeds, and Southport.

In 1846, he became a successful linguist and translator of German anti-rationalist critics.

In 1860, he became editor, having as his co-editor (1883-6) James Harrison Rigg, of the London Quarterly Review' to which he was already a contributor.

In 1867, he succeeded Dr. John Hannah the elder as tutor of systematic theology at Didsbury. He received the degree of D.D. from the Wesleyan University, U.S.A., in 1865 and from the University of Edinburgh in 1877. In 1876, he visited America with Dr. Rigg as delegate to the general conference of the methodist episcopal church at Baltimore.

In 1877, he was President of the Methodist Conference at Bristol.

From 1867 to 1886, he taught at Didsbury Wesleyan College in Manchester, England.

=== Theological contribution ===
Pope made notable contributions to theological literature which were deemed authoritative by his own church. His greatest work, a systematic theology, Compendium of Christian Theology (1875-1876), set forth influential arguments for the "holiness doctrine of all Methodist systematic theology" and defended Methodist doctrine against its critics. Wayne Grudem writes that, "This work […] is one of the greatest systematic theologies written from a Wesleyan or Arminian perspective." He had Arminian soteriological views.

=== Death ===
Pope died on 5 July 1903, and was buried in Abney Park Cemetery, London.

== Works ==
=== Books as author ===
- Pope, William Burt (1855). The Abiding Word. London: Wesleyan Conference Office. ISBN 978-0-665-46302-0.
- Pope, William Burt (1856). The Rest Of Our Time. London: John Mason.
- Pope, William Burt (1862). The Love Of The Commandment. London: John Mason.
- Pope, William Burt (1866). The Great National Fast. London: [publisher not identified].
- Pope, William Burt (1866). The Presence Of Christ In His Church. [publisher not identified].
- Pope, William Burt (1867). An inaugural address delivered in the college chapel. [publisher not identified].
- Pope, William Burt (1869). Discourses on the kingdom and reign of Christ. London: Simpkin, Marshall.
- Pope, William Burt (1871). The Person of Christ. London: Wesleyan Conference Office.
- Pope, William Burt (1872). The Law Of Perfect Service. London: Wesleyan Conference Office.
- Pope, William Burt (1873). The Peculiarities Of Methodist Doctrine. London: Wesleyan Conference Office.
- Pope, William Burt (1874). A Memoir of John Fernley. London: Wesleyan Conference Office.
- Pope, William Burt (1875). The Person Of Christ. London: Wesleyan Conference Office.
- Pope, William Burt (1876). The Prayers Of St. Paul. London: Wesleyan Conference Office.
- Pope, William Burt (1876). A Memoir of the Late James Heald of Parrs Wood. London: Wesleyan Conference Office.
- Pope, William Burt (1877). A Compendium of Christian Theology. Vol. 1. London: Wesleyan Conference Office.
- Pope, William Burt (1877). A Compendium of Christian Theology. Vol. 2. London: Wesleyan Conference Office.
- Pope, William Burt (1877). A Compendium of Christian Theology. Vol. 3. London: Wesleyan Conference Office.
- Pope, William Burt (1883). A Higher Catechism of Theology. London: T. Woolmer.
- Pope, William Burt (1885). The Inward Witness and Other Discourses. London: T. Woolmer.

=== Books as translator ===
- Stier, Rudolf (1855). The Words of the Lord Jesus. Vol. 1. London: J. Gladding.
- Stier, Rudolf (1855). The Words of the Lord Jesus. Vol. 2. London: J. Gladding.
- Stier, Rudolf (1855). The Words of the Lord Jesus. Vol. 3. London: J. Gladding.
- Stier, Rudolf (1855). The Words of the Lord Jesus. Vol. 4. London: J. Gladding.
- Stier, Rudolf (1855). The Words of the Lord Jesus. Vol. 5. London: J. Gladding.
- Stier, Rudolf (1855). The Words of the Lord Jesus. Vol. 6. London: J. Gladding.
- Stier, Rudolf (1855). The Words of the Lord Jesus. Vol. 7. London: J. Gladding.
- Stier, Rudolf (1855). The Words of the Lord Jesus. Vol. 8. London: J. Gladding.
- Stier, Rudolf (1859). The Words of the Risen Savior and Commentary on the Epistle of St James. London: Hamilton, Adam and Co.
- Ebrard, Johann Heinrich August (1860). Commentary on the Epistles of St. John. London: Hamilton, Adam and Co.
- Peter, Johann (1861). Theological and Homiletical Commentary on the Gospels of St. Matthew and St. Mark. Vol. 1. London: Hamilton, Adam and Co.
- Peter, Johann (1861). Theological and Homiletical Commentary on the Gospels of St. Matthew and St. Mark. Vol. 2. London: Hamilton, Adam and Co.
- Wilhelm, Ernst (1865). Commentary on the Gospel of St. John. Vol. 1. London: Hamilton, Adam and Co.
- Wilhelm, Ernst (1865). Commentary on the Gospel of St. John. Vol. 2. London: Hamilton, Adam and Co.
- Wilhelm, Ernst (1871). History of the Kingdom of God. Vol. 1. London: Hamilton, Adam and Co.
- Wilhelm, Ernst (1871). History of the Kingdom of God. Vol. 2. London: Hamilton, Adam and Co.
- Benedikt, Georg (1873). A Comparative View on the Doctrines and Confessions of the Various Communities of Christendom. Edinburgh: T. & T. Clark.
- Haupt, Erich (1879). The First Epistle of St. John: A Contribution to Biblical Theology. Edinburgh: T. & T. Clark.

=== Chapters ===
- Pope, William Burt (1878). "Epistles of St. John". Philip Schaff's Popular Commentary on the NT. New York: Charles Scribner's sons.

== Notes and references ==
=== Citations ===
Attribution

This article incorporates text from a publication now in the public domain: Irwin, Clarke Huston (1912). "Pope, William Burt". Dictionary of National Biography (2nd supplement). Vol. 3. p. 127.

=== Sources ===
- Grudem, Wayne (1994). Systematic Theology: An Introduction to Biblical Doctrine. Leicester, England & Grand Rapids, MI: Inter-Varsity Press & Zondervan.
- Irwin, Clarke Huston (1912). "Pope, William Burt" . In Lee, Sidney (ed.). Dictionary of National Biography (2nd supplement). Vol. 3. London: Smith, Elder & Co. p. 127.
- Lees, C. H.; Wellings, Martin (2004). "Pope, William Burt (1822–1903)". Oxford Dictionary of National Biography. Oxford Dictionary of National Biography (online ed.). Oxford: Oxford University Press. doi:10.1093/ref:odnb/35574. (Subscription, Wikipedia Library access or UK public library membership required.)
- Olson, Roger E. (2010). "Arminian teaching regarding original sin". Roger E. Olson: My evangelical, Arminian theological musings. Patheos.
- Stevenson, George John (1885). "William Burt Pope, D.D.". Methodist Worthies : Characteristic Sketches of Methodist Preachers (PDF). Vol. 3. London: Thomas C; Jack.
