= Joseph Diggle =

British clergyman, politician and public servant

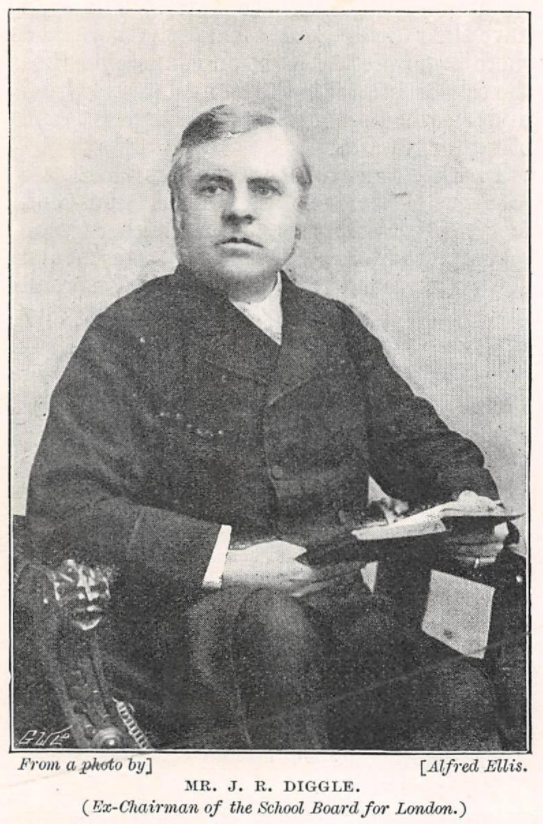
Joseph Robert Diggle, circa 1896

The Reverend Joseph Robert Diggle JP (12 May 1849 – 16 June 1917) was a British Anglican clergyman, politician and public servant. He is notable for his campaign to change the law to allow clergymen to take seats in the House of Commons (although he was unable to win a seat himself), and for his chairmanship of the London School Board. His combative approach to political debate was the key to his career, helping him to run the Board for nine years but denying him any higher office.

== Early life and family ==
Diggle was born in Pendleton, Lancashire, the youngest son of William Diggle, a warehouseman and his wife Nancy Ann née Chadderton. His elder brother, John William Diggle (1847–1920) was to become Bishop of Carlisle.

Joseph was educated at Manchester Grammar School and Wadham College, Oxford, where he read Modern History and obtained first class honours. Diggle then trained for the clergy and took holy orders. He was ordained in 1874, and was appointed curate at St Mark's Liverpool. Two years later he became curate of St Mary's Church, Bryanston Square, London, where William Henry Fremantle was rector.

In 1878 he married Jane Wilkinson Macrae, from Aigburth, south Liverpool. They had two sons and two daughters.

== Election to the London School Board ==
In 1879 he resigned his living "to devote himself to public work". On 1 July 1879 he sent a petition to Parliament to prohibit the sale of intoxicating liquors on Sunday. In November of the same year he was stood as a "Moderate" candidate for the London School Board, the elected body responsible for education in the capital. Board elections were largely run on a religious basis but Diggle was referred to as "a Churchman of Liberal views" who had campaigned to improve the condition of the masses on a social, moral and religious basis. With seven seats in the Marylebone Division, Diggle came second in the poll and was comfortably elected.

On the LSB, Diggle allied himself with those who resisted attempts to expand its work to new areas; he was in general opposition to the majority on the board. He specifically opposed the idea of 'higher elementary schools' which were proposed for older school age children, and called for economies in expenditure. From October 1883, despite still being in opposition, Diggle was chairman of the Finance Committee; he presented a scheme for superannuation of teachers' salaries in June 1884, which was eventually adopted. Despite his concern to reduce expenditure he was compelled to present estimates providing for increases in January 1885; he argued that there had been circumstances of an exceptional character. The Board ordered the estimates reduced by £60,000, but eventually adopted the budget.

=== 1885 general election ===
At the 1885 general election Diggle decided to test the law which prohibited anyone in holy orders in the Church of England from election to the House of Commons. He offered himself as an Independent candidate for the Marylebone East division, declaring that he would not be able to take his seat but urging electors to challenge such "antiquated and unjust restrictions". After a request locally he switched to Marylebone West. His nomination was accepted but he won only 101 votes.

== Chairman of the School Board ==
The London School Board elections of November 1885 saw Diggle running in a group of four clergymen; he finished fifth. However the results in the rest of London elected many more clergymen and when the new board met he was elected as its chairman and became leader of the governing Moderate Party. He again had to stand up to pressure from other members to slash spending, but by 1887 he was able to report progress in reducing the charge on the rates while educating more children. Diggle was also noted for his chairmanship skills through which he successfully prevented disorder despite the presence of several members predisposed to it. The Progressive Party, led by Edward Lyulph Stanley formed the opposition to the Moderate majority. The Progressives adopted the pejorative term "Diggleism" to describe the board's policy, which they saw as the deliberate underfunding of secular education to favour Anglican schools.

=== Disputatiousness ===
During the 1888 elections, Diggle was involved in a spat with Liberal politician A.J. Mundella who claimed that the Board was much more efficient over the three years previous to Diggle's chairmanship. A firm of accountants was engaged by Mundella in an attempt to prove the point; Diggle and Mundella agreed that they would arbitrate on who was telling the truth but fell out over the detailed questions to be submitted. Diggle quickly obtained an accountants' opinion substantiating his approach which was published on the morning of the election, in which Diggle maintained his majority.

Diggle had the pleasure in 1889 of seeing the Clerical Disabilities Act pass into law, which allowed clergyman who resigned their holy orders to stand for Parliament and take their seats. In 1891 there was a bad-tempered dispute between Diggle and the Charity Organisation Society over the provision of cheap or free meals to children in elementary schools. The School Board under Diggle had amalgamated several different societies to form the London Schools Dinner Association; the Charity Organisation Society investigated five unidentified schools and reported the Association's assistance was almost nonexistent. Diggle hit back and questioned the Charity Organisation Society's founding principles. Diggle was condemned in a Leader column of The Times (7 April 1891) for his "methods of controversy".

=== Conflict with the Board of Education ===
This denunciation did not seem to affect Diggle's popularity, for he was re-elected along with his administration in the election of November 1891. In 1893 he publicly confronted Arthur Dyke Acland, President of the Board of Education in William Ewart Gladstone's government, who had supported parents in Pimlico who were petitioning the Board to build a new school; on this occasion The Times was with Diggle in regarding the Minister's attack as partisan. In his annual report that October, Diggle attacked the Board of Education for costly interference with the School Board's work, singling out Circular No. 391 which prescribed onerous standards for structural and sanitary conditions in schools.

=== Departure from office ===
It was the subject of religious education which provoked one of the fiercest controversies within the Board during Diggle's chairmanship. When the Progressive group put down amendments to a board circular, Diggle quickly accepted a motion to close all debate on the subject. Going into the 1894 elections, the opposition pointedly opposed the motion that the chairman's annual address be printed and distributed, which had previously gone through without opposition. At the last meeting of the old board, the Progressives also divided against a vote of thanks to the chairman. The 1894 school board election saw the Progressive Party make large gains at the expense of the Moderates who however retained a narrow majority of 3. Diggle retained his seat in the seven-member Marylebone division, but slipped from first to fourth place, with the Progressive leader, Lyulph Stanley, topping the poll. The election had been a bitter and hard-fought, even sectarian, campaign. It was clear that Diggle, who had been a highly partisan chairman and campaigner, was too divisive a figure to head the finely balanced board. Accordingly, he stood aside at the new board's first meeting on 4 December, instead nominating the less controversial Lord George Hamilton to the post.

== Moderate split and departure form the school board ==
Using his experience of administering the Board, Diggle wrote a manifesto suggesting ways of reducing expenditure. He opposed the Moderate Group leadership's support for voluntary schools set up by nonconformists and formed a faction within the Moderate group in equal opposition to the administration of Lord George Hamilton and to the Progressive group. In the 1897 election, Diggle was the leading personality, leading his own group into the elections. He was largely blamed for the Moderate split and saw his vote drop by nearly two-thirds from over 31,000 to less than 10,500, losing his own seat by 4,000 votes. He was nominated as a candidate in the 1900 elections but withdrew before the poll.

== Later life ==
=== Kent ===
Diggle had moved to St Michael's Grange, Tenterden in Kent, of which he was mayor in 1895–1896 and 1901–1902. In 1898 he was elected to Kent County Council, and was appointed chairman of the county council's Elementary Schools Education Committee in 1908.

=== 1900 general election ===
At the 1900 general election he was the Conservative candidate for Camberwell North, opposing Thomas Macnamara who had been a teacher in a Board School and later served on the Board together with Diggle; Diggle lost by 1,335 votes a seat where the Conservatives had won the previous election by 693.

=== Financial difficulties ===
Diggle had lived largely on his wife's earnings since 1878, and lived beyond his means including spending considerable sums on repairing his homes in Regents Park and Kent. After 1904 he was forced to go to moneylenders to borrow money at high rates of interest. In October 1905 he was given a certificate for 1,000 Metropolitan Three per Cent. Consolidated stock in order that he might trace the owner; instead, Diggle gave it to his banker as a security for his overdraft. On 23 November 1909 he was adjudicated bankrupt with debts of £12,763 3s 7d; two years later his creditors had received 1s 3d in the pound.

=== Public health ===
In addition to his educational interests Diggle became an honorary Fellow of the British Institute of Public Health. He had attended many international conferences on public health while at the School Board and was a corresponding member of the Belgian Société Royale de Médecine Publique de Belgique from 1891. He served as President of Section V of the International Congress of Hygiene and Demography at London in 1892 and of Section VI at Budapest in 1894.

He served as Chairman of the Council of the Royal Botanic Society in 1907, and was Chairman of the Council of the Ragged School Union and Shaftesbury Society from 1906 to 1908.

=== Retirement and death ===
In 1910 Diggle moved to Oxford, where he died aged 69 in January 1917.

Government offices
Preceded by Edward Buxton	Chairman of the London School Board; 1885–1894	Succeeded by Lord George Hamilton
