= William Barker (priest, died 1917) =

Dean of Carlisle

William Barker (1 December 1838 – 28 January 1917) was Dean of Carlisle from 1908 to his death in 1917.

Born in London, he was educated at Worcester College, Oxford and ordained in 1862. He began his ecclesiastical career as Curate of Hanover Chapel, Regent Street after which he was the Chaplain to the Royal Ophthalmic Hospital, Moorfields. He was Vicar of St Mary's, West Cowes from 1873 to 1882 and an Honorary Chaplain to the Queen. From 1882 to 1888 he was a member of the London School Board, representing Marylebone. He was Rector of St Marylebone until his elevation to the Deanery in 1908.

Church of England titles
Preceded by Charles Ridgeway	Dean of Carlisle; 1908–1917	Succeeded by Hastings Rashdall
