= Mary Bridges-Adams =

British educationalist, socialist and activist

Mary Jane Bridges-Adams (née Daltry; 19 October 1854 – 14 January 1939) was a British educationalist, socialist, and activist. She campaigned for free, compulsory, secular education for all and for free school meals.

== Early life and education ==
She was born at Maesycwmmer, Bedwas, Monmouthshire, south Wales, the daughter of a Welsh engine-fitter William Daltry and his wife Margaret Jones. The family later moved to Newcastle-upon-Tyne and after working at schools in Newcastle, Bridges-Adams studied at the University of London and in 1882 was awarded a distinction at Bedford College, London, in Greek and Maths. She married Walter Bridges-Adams on 22 October 1887.

== Career ==
Bridges-Adams's early career was as a teacher in schools in Birmingham and in London, and she was also the headmistress of a board school (a type of free elementary school established by the Elementary Education Act 1870). In 1894 she stood for election to the London School Board, representing the Greenwich division, supported by the Royal Arsenal Co-operative Society, trade unions (the Gas Workers' Union, the Amalgamated Society of Engineers) and the London Nonconformist Council. She failed to be elected, but was successful three years later, and was re-elected in 1900 as the sole Independent Labour Party candidate, with an increased majority, remaining a member of the board until its abolition. The school boards were then one of the few elected bodies of the United Kingdom on which women could serve.

In 1900, she was involved in the opening of a Fröbel-influenced free "kindergarten" in Woolwich, London; this was the first such educational establishment in England. With the closing of the school boards, she became secretary to Daisy Greville, Countess of Warwick, and with her continued campaigning. In 1905, the two led a motor tour of the country to promote the concept of free school meals. Bridges-Adams founded the first 'Open Air School for Recovery' (which aimed to show the "therapeutic effects of open air and regular meals on debilitated children") in Bostall Woods, London in 1907 and another on Shooter's Hill, London, the following year.

She supported adult education for workers through the Plebs League and the Central Labour College, and founded the Working Women's Movement. Outside of her education-related campaigning, Bridges-Adams was also involved in other causes. She fought for improved living conditions of working class women: as a member of her local Woolwich Women's Co-operative Guild, she campaigned for improved housing and sanitation, and for the building of cultural facilities such as a picture gallery and a free library. In 1917, alongside Joseph King (a Member of Parliament) and Lord Edward Stanley (a peer and former member of the London School Board), she campaigned for the continuation of the right of asylum for refugees from the Russian Empire.

== Personal life ==
On 22 October 1887, Mary Daltry married Walter Bridges Adams, the son of William Bridges Adams. Together they had one son, William Bridges-Adams (1889–1965). Her husband predeceased her, dying in 1902.

Her husband's family paid for her son to attend Bedales School, a progressive private school. Though this may have conflicted with her own views about education, sending her son to a fee-paying boarding school was likely the only way she could have continued her activism as a single-parent.
