= Charles Ridgeway =

English churchman

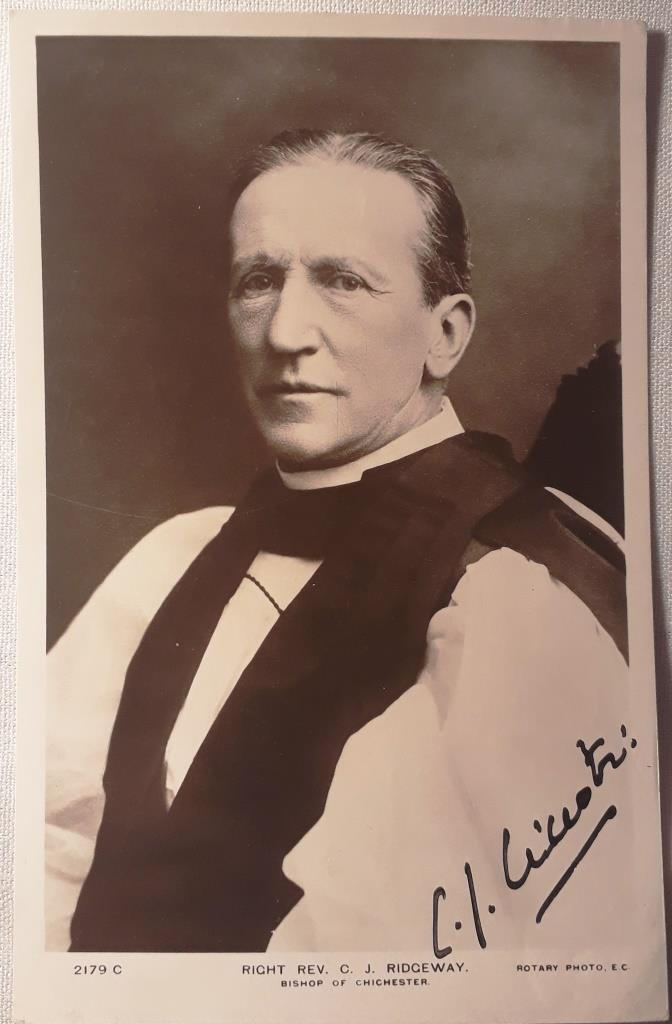
Ridgeway as Bishop of Chichester

Charles John Ridgeway (14 July 1841 – 28 February 1927) was an English churchman, the Bishop of Chichester from 1908 to 1919.

== Life ==
Ridgeway was born into an ecclesiastical family: his father Joseph Ridgeway was Vicar of Christ Church, Tunbridge Wells; his younger brother of Frederick became Bishop of Salisbury. He was educated at St Paul's School, and matriculated in 1860 at Trinity College, Cambridge, graduating B.A. in 1864, M.A. 1885 and D.D. 1906.

Ordained in 1866, Ridgeway spent a curacy at Christ Church, Tunbridge Wells before becoming Vicar of North Malvern, Rector of Buckhurst Hill, Vicar of Christchurch Lancaster Gate and Rural Dean of Paddington. From 1891-1894 he was a member of the London School Board, representing the Marylebone Division.

A Freemason, Ridgeway was under the jurisdiction of the United Grand Lodge of England. In 1897 he was granted the honorific rank of Past Grand Chaplain in recognition of his services to English Freemasonry, as part of a series of similar honorary promotions intended to mark the diamond jubilee of Queen Victoria.

After two years (1906–1908) as Dean of Carlisle Ridgeway was appointed Bishop of Chichester in 1908. His appointment was at the age of 66, and the result of a dispute between the Archbishop of Canterbury and the Prime Minister, who was then the key figure in the nomination process for bishops. There was disagreement over rival candidates, and Ridgeway appears to have been a compromise.

During World War I, Ridgeway provided support for soldiers in the large military camps in Sussex, and encouraged the recruitment of temporary chaplains.

Ridgeway died on 28 February 1927 aged 85 in London, and was buried at Limpsfield. An obituary noted that he had " ... too much sense of humour ever to take himself heavily, and was too much a man of the world ever to lose his realism."

== Legacy ==
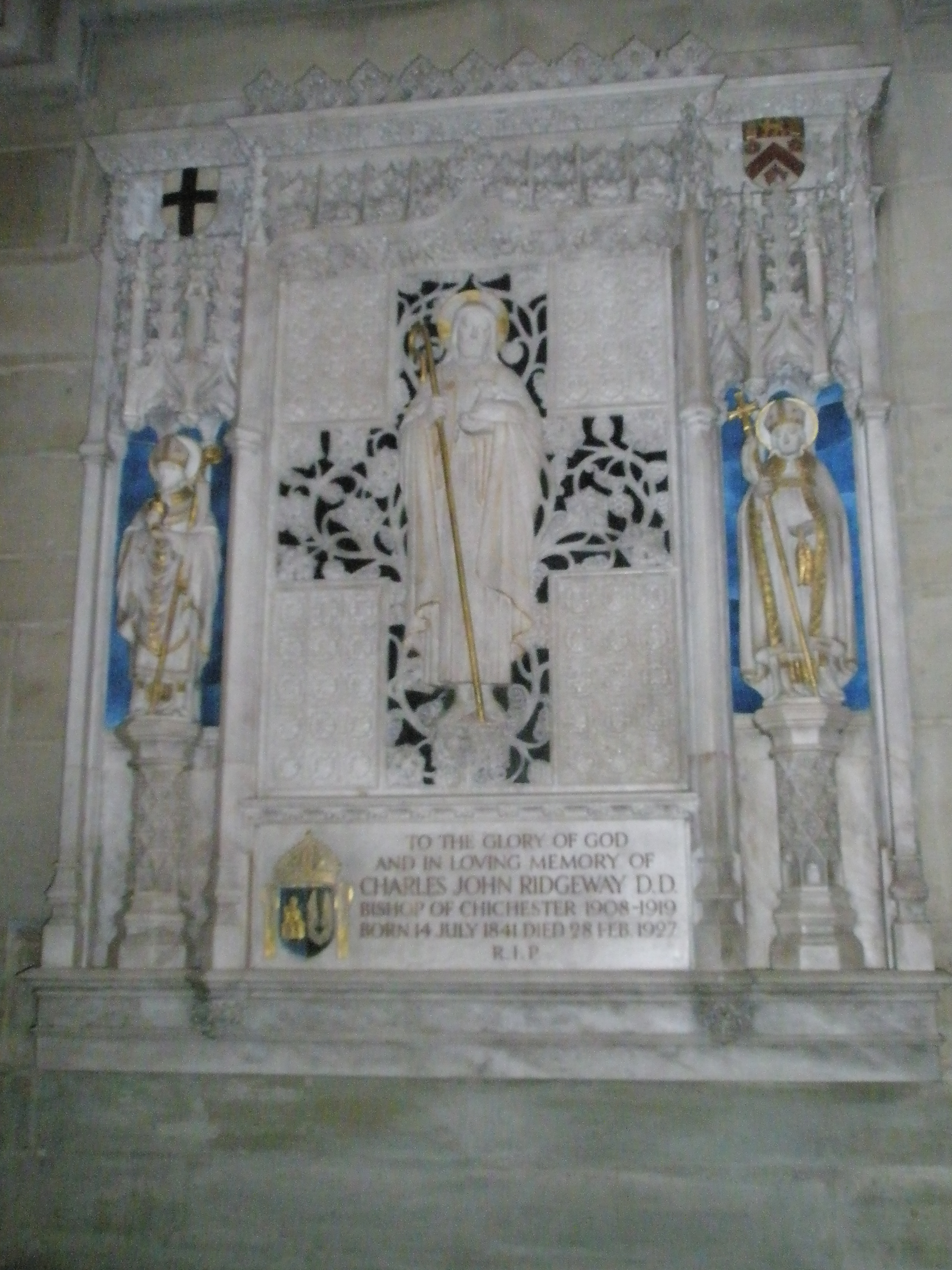
Memorial within Chichester Cathedral

After his death Ridgeway's widow presented his pectoral cross to the Chichester Cathedral library, and commissioned a memorial to him which can be seen in the nave.

== Family ==
Ridgeway was twice married:

1. In 1866, to Susan Jane Fitzgerald, daughter of the Rev. Gerald Fitzgerald; their daughter Una Geraldine married in 1892 Ronald Montagu Burrows.
2. In 1899, to Katherine Margaret Johnston, daughter of the Rev. Hugh William Johnston.

== Notes ==
Church of England titles
Preceded by Ernest Wilberforce	Bishop of Chichester; 1908 – 1919	Succeeded by Winfrid Burrows
Preceded by William Henderson	Dean of Carlisle; 1906 – 1908	Succeeded by William Barker
