= James Harrison Rigg =

British Methodist minister (1821–1909)

President of the Methodist Conference
- In office 1878–1879
- Preceded by: William Burt Pope
- Succeeded by: Benjamin Gregory
- In office 1892–1893
- Preceded by: Thomas Bowman Stephenson
- Succeeded by: Henry John Pope

Personal details
- Born: 16 January 1821 Newcastle-on-Tyne
- Died: 7 April 1909 (aged 88)
- Occupation: Methodist educator

James Harrison Rigg (16 January 1821 – 7 April 1909) was an English nonconformist minister and Methodist educator.

== Life ==
He was born at Newcastle-on-Tyne on 16 January 1821, was son of John Rigg, a Methodist minister there, by his second wife Anne, daughter of James McMullen, Irish Methodist missionary at Gibraltar. Brought up in straitened circumstances, the boy was for five years (1830–5) a pupil and for four years (1835-9) a junior teacher at the Kingswood school for preachers' sons near Bristol. In 1839, he became assistant in the Rev. Firth's Academy, Hartstead Moor, near Leeds, and having made an unsuccessful effort to conduct a school of his own at Islington, London, he became in 1843 classical and mathematical master at John Conquest's school at Biggleswade. In July 1845, he entered the Methodist ministry as probationer, and being ordained on 1 August 1849, served in successive circuits at Worcester, Guernsey, Brentford, Stockport, Manchester, Folkestone, and Tottenham.

From an early date Rigg read widely and wrote much on religious and theological themes. A vigorous and clear style gave his writings influence in his denomination. He was a chief contributor to the Biblical Review (1846–9), and frequently wrote in the Wesleyan newspaper, the Watchman. Contributing to the first number of the London Quarterly Review, a Wesleyan Methodist periodical, in September 1853, he soon joined its editorial staff (1868), was co-editor with Dr. William Burt Pope (1883–6), and ultimately sole editor (1886–98).

Rigg explained his theological position in three suggestive volumes: Principles of Wesleyan Methodism (1850; 2nd edit. 1851), Wesleyan Methodism and Congregationalism contrasted (1852), and Modern Anglican Theology (1857; 3rd edit. 1880). In the last, which discussed the historical development of the Church of England, he criticised the broad-church teaching of F. D. Maurice, Charles Kingsley and Benjamin Jowett; his differences with Kingsley were considerately expressed, Kingsley sought his acquaintance, and Rigg stayed with him at Eversley.

In 1866, Rigg republished many periodical articles as Essays for the Times on Ecclesiastical and Social Subjects, and in 1869 he issued Churchmanship of John Wesley (new edit. 1879). His literary work was early valued in America. He acted as English correspondent of the New Orleans Christian Advocate (1851) and of the New York Christian Advocate (1857–76). In 1865, he received the degree of D.D. from Dickinson College.

In 1868, Rigg was appointed principal of the (Wesleyan) Westminster Training College for day school teachers and he used that role to encourage his daughter Caroline Rigg to also be a leading teacher. Rigg led the Westminster Training College till 1903.

In matters of education, he acquired an expert knowledge and was an active controversialist. When the first elementary education act was passed in 1870, Rigg took the traditional Wesleyan view, opposing secularism and favouring denominational schools, although without sympathy for sectarian exclusiveness. From William Arthur and Hugh Price Hughes, both of whom supported the transfer of Wesleyan schools to the school board as created in 1870, he differed profoundly. He pressed his views, in correspondence, on the attention of Gladstone and W. E. Forster, and the Wesleyan conference supported him. In 1870, he was elected a member for Westminster on the first London School Board, and served in that capacity till 1876. With the help of Professor Huxley and W. H. Smith, M.P., he secured the provision of a syllabus of religious instruction. In 1873, he summarised this attitude in National Education in its Social Conditions and Aspects. Subsequently he was a member of the royal commission on elementary education (1886-8), over which Sir Richard Cross presided and which reported in favour of the school board management as against the voluntary system.

In the general administration of Wesleyan affairs Rigg was recognised to be a statesmanlike leader of liberal-conservative temper. Elected chairman of the Kent district in 1865, he was made a member of the legal hundred in 1866. In 1878, he was elected President of the Methodist Conference, and the unusual distinction was paid him of re-election in 1892. From 1877 until 1896, with two brief intervals, he was chairman of the second London district, and from 1881 to 1909 he was treasurer of the Wesleyan Missionary Society.

In controversies concerning the internal organisation of the Wesleyan church Rigg took a middle course. He met the demand of the 'progressive' section under Hugh Price Hughes for an enlarged participation of the laity in the work of the conference, by proposing and carrying the 'Sandwich Compromise' in 1890, which ’sandwiched' a representative lay session between the two sittings of the pastoral session. The compromise lasted till 1901, when the liberal section prevailed and conference was opened by ministers and laymen together, though the pastoral session still retained the privilege of electing the president. Rigg's proposal of 1894, in which Hughes supported him, to exempt chairmen of districts from circuit duties and leave them free to exercise supervision over the district, was rejected by the conference from a suspicion that Rigg's 'separated chairmen' had a colour of episcopacy. Rigg's own position in the matter was defined in his Comparative View of Church Organisation. Primitive and Protestant (1887; 3rd edit. 1896). With Hughes and the progressive party Rigg's relations were often strained. Writing privately to Cardinal Manning, a colleague on the education commission, on the education question, December 1888, he described Hughes as 'your intemperate temperance coadjutor, our methodist firebrand.' The unauthorised publication of the letter in Purcell's Life of the cardinal (1895) led to reprisals by Hughes, who wrote in the Methodist Times an article on "The Self-Revelation of Dr. Rigg." At Rigg's request the letter was withdrawn from later editions of Purcell's book, and Hughes and he were reconciled.

Rigg, whose somewhat rough manner caused even friendly admirers to liken him to Dr. Johnson, never abated his literary energies amid his varied activities. For many years he was a member of the committee of the London Library.

He died on 17 April 1909, at 79 Brixton Hill, where he had lived since 1889, and was buried in Norwood cemetery.

== Family ==
He married, on 17 June 1851, Caroline, daughter of John Smith, alderman of Worcester. She died on 17 December 1889, leaving two daughters and a son. The elder daughter, Caroline Edith Rigg, was head-mistress of the Mary Datchelor School and Training College, Camberwell; and the son, James McMullen, was a barrister-at-law.

== Works ==
The chief publications of his later life were :

- The Living Wesley (1875; re-issued as The Centennial Life of Wesley in 1891 );
- Discourses and Addresses on Religion and Philosophy (1880);
- Character and Life-work of Dr. Pusey (1893);
- Oxford High Anglicanism and its Chief Leaders (1895; 2nd edit. 1899), an interesting study and the only attempt made by a nonconformist to write a history of the Oxford movement. Rigg was a severe critic of Newman.

There followed Reminiscences sixty Years ago (1904), and Jabez Bunting, a short Biography (1905).

Rigg also wrote the article on "Methodism" in the Encyclopædia Britannica (9th edit.).
