= William Bridges-Adams =

English theatre director and designer

Set design for Act II of Gilbert and Sullivan's Ruddigore, 1921

William Bridges-Adams (1 March 1889 – 17 August 1965) was an English theatre director and designer, associated closely with the Shakespeare Memorial Theatre, Stratford-upon-Avon, from 1919 until 1934.

== Life and career ==
=== Early years ===
William Bridges-Adams was born in Harrow, England, the only son of Walter Bridges Adams, tutor, and his wife, Mary Jane née Daltry (1854–1939) and grandson of the author and inventor William Bridges Adams. He was educated at Bedales School and Worcester College, Oxford.

At Oxford, Bridges-Adams joined the Oxford University Dramatic Society and played the leading roles of Leontes in The Winter's Tale and Prospero in The Tempest, but his talent for direction and design was already leading him from acting to a backstage role. He staged two operas for Sir Hugh Allen, and directed the Oxford millenary pageant. His design was influenced by the Post-Impressionists and by personal contacts with Charles Ricketts and Charles Shannon.

=== Directing and designing ===
After Oxford, Bridges-Adams began working in the professional theatre in 1911 under the managements of Laurence Irving, William Poel, Nugent Monck, Harley Granville-Barker and George Alexander. During this period Bridges-Adams occasionally worked as an actor, but more usually as a director and as a designer for other directors' productions. His first London production was in 1912 (a play called Job, for the Norwich Players), a company he continued to work with alongside Monck for several years. He became producer for the Bristol Old Vic repertory seasons, 1914–1915, and the Playhouse Theatre, Liverpool, 1916–1917. His designs for stage scenery included The Loving Heart at the New Theatre in 1918 ("Quite the happiest feature of the production is Mr Bridges-Adams's scenery," said The Times) and no fewer than nine Gilbert and Sullivan operas for the D'Oyly Carte Opera Company, beginning with The Gondoliers (second act), Patience, Iolanthe, The Sorcerer, The Pirates of Penzance, Princess Ida, The Mikado, The Yeomen of the Guard, and all in 1919, and Ruddigore (1921).

=== Shakespeare at Stratford ===
In 1919, Bridges-Adams was appointed director of the Stratford-on-Avon Festival in succession to Sir Frank Benson. There were doubts about the continuing viability of the festival, and Bridges-Adams realised that changes and new ideas would be necessary. He threw himself into the task with great enthusiasm. His ambition was to win for Stratford an international status on a par with that of the Salzburg Festival. He secured the services of Theodore Komisarjevsky to direct The Merchant of Venice and Macbeth, and he himself produced 29 of Shakespeare's plays between 1919 and his retirement in 1934. Unusually for the times, in which the production of Shakespeare's plays was heavily cut in the style of William Poel and Nugent Monck, he presented the plays without cuts in the text, thereby earning the nickname 'Mr Unabridges-Adams'.

The original Memorial Theatre at Stratford was gutted by a disastrous fire in March 1926. Bridges-Adams' design for the stage layout of the replacement theatre (now the Royal Shakespeare Theatre) was followed by architect Elisabeth Scott when the new theatre was built in 1932.

In 1934 he resigned as director of the festival. The Times, in its obituary notice states, possibly tactfully, that he felt new blood was needed, but the Dictionary of National Biography states that he was frustrated by the governors' failure to back him in his attempts to gain an international status for the theatre with more guest directors of international repute.

=== Later years ===
In 1936 Bridges-Adams directed Stravinsky's Oedipus Rex at Covent Garden, and he was appointed to the council of the Royal Academy of Dramatic Art and to the building advisory committee for the National Theatre. From 1937 to 1944 he worked as dramatic adviser to the British Council, promoting foreign tours of British works by British stage companies.

His publications include: The Shakespeare Country, 1932; The British Theatre, 1944; Looking at a Play, 1947; The Lost Leader, 1954; The Irresistible Theatre, 1957; To Charlotte While Shaving (verse), 1957; and, posthumously, a collection of his letters edited by Robert Speaight, 1971.

William Bridges-Adams died at his home in Bantry, Ireland, aged 76, and was buried in the Abbey cemetery at Bantry.
