= Jane Chessar =

Jane Agnes Chessar (1835, in Edinburgh – 3 September 1880, in Brussels) was a British teacher and educationalist.

== Life ==
Educated at private schools in Edinburgh, Chessar travelled to London in 1851 to train as a teacher. Early in 1852 she took charge of a class at the Home and Colonial Training College, raising the reputation of the college over the next fifteen years. After ill-health forced her to resign from this position in 1866, she occupied her time giving lectures and private tuition. She was elected a member of the London School Board in 1873, but did not seek re-election after forced to leave England for a warmer climate in 1875. Her death was caused by cerebral apoplexy, while she was in Brussels for an educational congress.

Chessar edited Mary Somerville's Physical Geography and William Hughes's Physical Geography. She was a prolific contributor to The Queen and other newspapers.

== Sources ==
- Jane Martin & Joyce Goodman, Women and education, 1800-1980, Basingstoke: Palgrave Macmillan, 2004. ISBN 0-333-94721-5
