= Edward Buxton (conservationist) =

British conservationist and Liberal Party politician

Edward North Buxton (1 September 1840 – 9 January 1924) was a British conservationist and Liberal Party politician who sat in the House of Commons from 1885 to 1886. He was also an alpine climber, with significant first or second ascents in the 1860s, including the Aiguille de Bionnassay, Piz Palu and the first traverse of Lyskamm.

== Biography ==
Buxton was the third son of Sir Edward North Buxton, 2nd Baronet (1812–1858), and his wife, Catherine Gurney. Both father and son were called "Edward North Buxton" and both became Members of Parliament. Buxton was educated at Trinity College, Cambridge. He was a partner in the London brewing firm of Truman, Hanbury, & Co. and a J.P. and a Deputy Lieutenant for Essex. He was commissioned as Ensign in the part-time 7th (Mile End) Tower Hamlets Rifle Volunteer Corps on 19 August 1862. The unit formed part of the 1st Administrative Battalion, Tower Hamlets Rifle Volunteer Corps, commanded by his uncle Charles Buxton, MP, and elder brother Sir Fowell Buxton, 3rd Baronet.

Buxton stood for parliament unsuccessfully at South Essex in 1880. In 1885, he was elected MP for the Walthamstow constituency as a Liberal: he made six contributions during his year as an MP. Buxton was an advocate of the provision of open, accessible land, particularly near cities. He and his brother Thomas played a major part in saving Epping Forest and Hainault Forests for public use, contributing to the passing of the Epping Forest Act 1878. He was a verderer of Hatfield Forest, which he purchased for the National Trust from his deathbed. He was a founding member of the Society for the Preservation of the Wild Fauna of the Empire, now Fauna and Flora International.

In 1862, Buxton married Emily Digby, the daughter of the Rev. the Hon. Kenelm Henry Digby, Rector of Tittleshall and Hon. Canon of Norwich, and sister of Sir Kenelm Digby.

Buxton died at the age of 83. His home, Leytonstone House, carries a blue plaque. He is also commemorated by an inscription in the council chamber of Essex County Council.

== Sportsman ==
Buxton was also a notable amateur lawn tennis player between 1879 and 1883. He won two singles titles at the Woodford Parish Championship in 1880 and 1881. He was also a semi finalist at the Essex Championships in 1881. Buxton also competed two times at the 1879 Wimbledon Championships and the 1880 Wimbledon Championships.

Government offices
Preceded by Charles Reed	Chairman of the London School Board; 1881–1885	Succeeded by Rev. Joseph Diggle
Parliament of the United Kingdom
New constituency See South Essex	Member of Parliament for Walthamstow; 1885 – 1886	Succeeded by William Makins
