= Edith Simcox =

British writer (1844–1901)

Edith Jemima Simcox (21 August 1844 – 15 September 1901) was a British philosopher, writer, trade union activist, and feminist.

She published a large number of journal articles in Fraser's Magazine, Fortnightly Review, The Nineteenth Century, Macmillan's Magazine, Contemporary Review, the philosophy journal Mind (journal) and in particular The Academy (periodical), for which she wrote around 70 articles. The topics ranged widely but mainly covered literature, philosophy, and social and political issues. She often used the pseudonym "H. Lawrenny". Within philosophy Simcox often reviewed and responded to German philosophy of the time. For example, she wrote on Schopenhauer (Contemporary Review, 1872), on Johann Georg Hamann, Heinrich Heine (The Academy, 1872 and 1869). Amongst other literary works she reviewed Middlemarch by George Eliot (1873) and the Memoir of Jane Austen (1870).

From essays Simcox progressed to write several books. Natural Law: An Essay in Ethics appeared in 1877. Simcox approached morality as a natural phenomenon, opposing the view that morality must depend on religion. The book gave an account of government, morality, religion, and the ideal form of social, political and economic organisation. It was an ambitious work and was widely reviewed. In Mind (journal), for example, it was described as a "thoughtful and able work [which] is in many respects the most important contribution yet made to the Ethics of the Evolution-Theory".

Simcox's other major theoretical work was the massive two-volume Primitive Civilisations, published in 1894. It was on the Egyptian, Babylonian, Phoenician, and Chinese civilisations, looking at the relation between their property relations and other aspects of their social organisation. She argued that Europeans had underestimated these societies and that the West had much to learn from them. A reviewer in the American Journal of Sociology said that she had produced a "book which for interest to the student of social institutions may be compared with Herbert Spencer's Principles of Sociology".

Simcox was involved in politics and the union movement. In 1875 she and Emma Paterson became the first women to attend the Trades Union Congress as delegates. From 1879-1882 she was a member of the London School Board representing Westminster.

In 1872, when she was preparing a book review of Middlemarch, Edith Simcox met and fell in love with the female novelist known by her pseudonym, George Eliot. Although this "love-passion" was not reciprocated, Simcox was determined "to love rather than be loved" and continued to be a devoted friend to Eliot. For Simcox's complete journal, see Fulmer and Barfield, eds., Autobiography of a Shirtmaker. Simcox lived at 60 Dean Street, London.

== Selected works ==
- Natural Law: An Essay in Ethics (1877)
- George Eliot. Her life and works (1881) article in the Nineteenth Century
- Episodes in the Lives of Men, Women and Lovers (1882) fiction
- The Capacity of Women (1887) article in the Nineteenth Century
- Primitive Civilizations: or Outlines of the History of Ownership in Archaic Communities (1894)
- A Monument to the Memory of George Eliot: Edith J. Simcox's Autobiography of a Shirtmaker (1998) autobiography, edited by Constance M. Fulmer and Margaret E. Barfield (New York: Routledge, 1997)
