= James Stiff =

British potter

James Stiff (1808–18 May 1897) was an English potter. He was born in 1808, the son of Robert Stiff, a workhouse master and farmer in Rougham, Suffolk. In 1831 he married Sarah Faulkner Philpott, and Lucy Potter in 1878.

Transfer printed salt glaze ginger beer bottle marked STIFF - LAMBETH for Thomas Foord, Cross-In-Hand c.1874. 17 cm height

Stiff worked his way up from a mould maker in 1830 at Doulton and Watts' Lambeth Pottery in London to owning his own pottery works in Lambeth in 1843. He brought his sons William and Ebenezer into the family business, taking on the name James Stiff and Sons. They were part of a vibrant collection of potters in Lambeth at the time, including Doulton and Watts Pottery in Lambeth High Street (later Doulton & Company) and Stephen Green's Imperial Pottery. This group of Lambeth potteries were famous for their varied types of stoneware and salt glaze pottery; Stiff & Sons also produced effervescent, colourful pottery and domestic wares, pots and bottles.

== Career ==
In 1826, Stiff left his job as a plasterer's assistant in Rougham; he went to London, beginning an apprenticeship at the Coade Stone manufactory. Four years later, he began work at Doulton and Watt's Lambeth Pottery as a mould maker. In 1842, he commenced working as a potter at his own premises in Ferry Street, Lambeth (previously the premises of T. Higgins). Directories of the time record him making water filters. The following year, Stiff leased the first portion of his 39 High Street, Lambeth premises; however, he is still listed in trade directories at Ferry Street until 1844. From 1845 on, he is listed at 39 High Street. In 1863 Stiff brought his sons, William and Ebenezer, into partnership with him as James Stiff and Sons.

An 1895 article in The British Clayworker described Stiff as "now retired"; he died in Swanage in 1897. Following his death, in 1903 a new partnership of Sydney James Stiff (1867–1948), James Arthur Stiff and William Frederick Stiff (born 1874, another son of Ebenezer) was formed. This partnership was dissolved on 31 December 1912, and the following year the firm was sold to Royal Doulton.

He died at Swanage on 18 May 1897 and, like his contemporaries Doulton and Green, Stiff was buried at West Norwood Cemetery.
