= Alice Westlake =

English painter, engraver and activist for women's rights

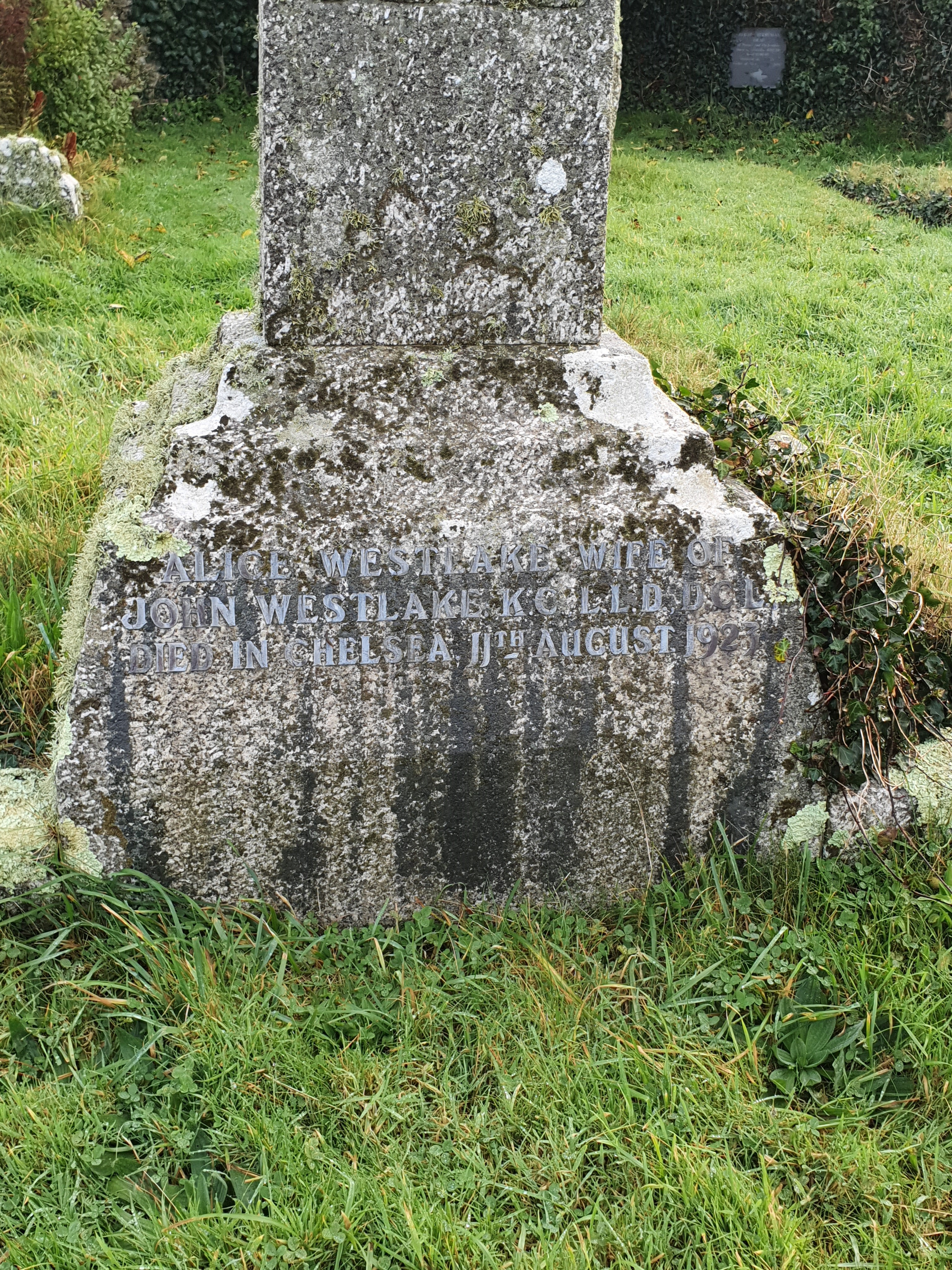
- Zennor Churchyard
- Born: 1842
- Died: 11 August 1923 (aged 80–81); Chelsea, London
- Known for: Painter, engraver and activist for women's rights
- Spouse: John Westlake
- Parent(s): Sir Thomas Hare; Mary née Samson

Alice Westlake (1842 –11 August 1923) was an English painter, engraver and activist for women's rights.

The daughter of Sir Thomas Hare, she was born Alice Hare. In 1864, she married legal scholar John Westlake. The couple lived in London and West Cornwall. In 1876, she was elected to the London School Board for Marylebone division; she held that position until 1888. She also served on the London School Board Election Committee and so was able to help other women candidates win seats on the London School Board.

Westlake exhibited at the Royal Academy from 1875 to 1877; she also exhibited at the Paris Salon. Her work is included in the collection of the National Portrait Gallery in London.

She was also active in the suffragist movement. She and her sisters Marian and Katherine signed John Stuart Mill's 1866 women's suffrage petition. Westlake was a member of the Langham Place group. She was closely involved with Elizabeth Garrett Anderson's hospital for women and served on the central committee of the National Society for Women's Suffrage.

Her portrait, painted by Lowes Cato Dickinson, is held by University College Hospital in London.
