= London School Board =

School board in England, 1870–1904

School Board for London
- Nickname: London School Board
- Successor: London County Council
- Formation: 1870; 156 years ago
- Dissolved: 30 April 1904; 122 years ago
- Type: School board
- Headquarters: Victoria Embankment
- Location: London, England

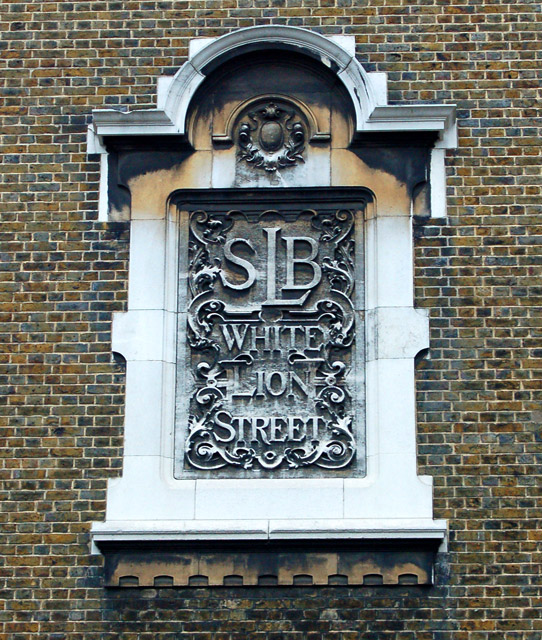
School Board for London's Plaque on White Lion Street School, Islington, now New River College

The School Board for London, commonly known as the London School Board (LSB), was an institution of local government and the first directly elected body covering the whole of London.

The Elementary Education Act 1870 (33 & 34 Vict. c. 75) was the first to provide for education for the whole population of England and Wales. It created elected school boards, which had power to build and run elementary schools where there were insufficient voluntary school places; they could also compel attendance. In most places, the school boards were based on borough districts or civil parishes, but in London the board covered the whole area of the Metropolitan Board of Works – the area today known as Inner London.

Between 1870 and 1904, the LSB was the single largest educational provider in London and the infrastructure and policies it developed were an important influence on London schooling long after the body was abolished.

== School board members ==
The entire board was elected every three years, with the first elections held in November 1870. The LSB originally consisted of forty-nine members elected from ten divisions, based around London's constituencies or the districts formed under the Metropolis Management Act 1855. Four divisions, representing the City, Southwark, Chelsea and Greenwich returned four members each. The divisions of Lambeth, Tower Hamlets, Hackney and Westminster returned five members each. Finally, Finsbury and Marylebone returned six and seven members respectively. The membership increased over time: to 50 in 1876 when Lambeth was given an extra member, to 51 in 1882 when the representation of Chelsea increased to five members and to 55 in 1885 when Lambeth was sub-divided into two smaller divisions: Lambeth East and Lambeth West with four and six members respectively.

The electoral system of the LSB contained several innovations. Firstly, the board's election of 1870 was polled by secret ballot, being the first large-scale election to use this approach in Britain. Secondly, the cumulative voting system gave electors a number of votes equal to the number of seats in the division in which they were voting. The elector could use up as many of their votes on a single candidate as they wished, which meant that minority interests often found representation.

The LSB, at the time of its creation had one of the broadest mandates of any elected body in Britain. Unusually, women were permitted to vote on the same terms as men for the school boards and also to stand for election. Three women stood in the first board election in 1870: Elizabeth Garrett, who topped the poll, Emily Davies, who also won election, and Maria Georgina Grey. When the second elections were held, in 1873, Garrett and Davies stood down, to be replaced by Jane Agnes Chessar and Alice Cowell, while in 1876, Florence Fenwick Miller, Elizabeth Surr, Helen Taylor and Alice Westlake all won election.

One measure of the LSB's importance can be seen in the number of notable figures who stood for election to the board. The board attracted a number of the leading figures of the day, including the scientist Thomas Huxley, Helen Taylor, stepdaughter of John Stuart Mill, and Lord Lawrence, who served as the LSB's first chairman. The board was also responsible for launching a number of political careers, including those of Charles Reed, Benjamin Waugh, and the Conservative cabinet minister, William Henry Smith.

== Work of the school board ==
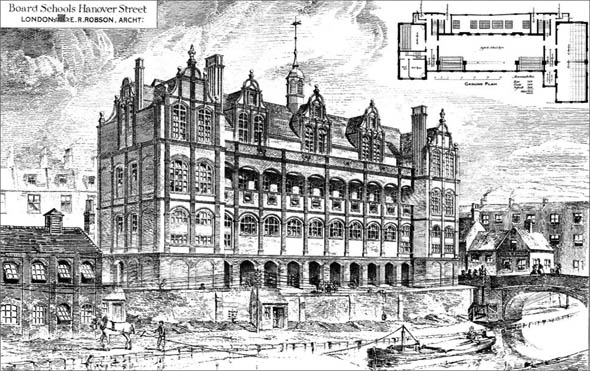
Board Schools, Hanover Street (1879)

The original intention of the board was to provide a sufficient number of school places for the poorest children in London, which were originally estimated at little more than 100,000. The policy adopted by the LSB was to provide London with modern, high-quality schools, whilst compelling parents, by law, to educate their children. Although education would not be compulsory on a national level until 1880, the board passed a by-law in 1871 that compelled parents to have their children schooled between the ages of five and thirteen.

While it did not completely prohibit corporal punishment, the London School Board had significantly restricedt corporal punishment by 1880.

The LSB was largely successful in their aims and often struggled to keep up with the demand for their services. For instance, by the end of the 1880s, the board was providing school places for more than 350,000 children. This growth was frequently attributed to the quality of school premises, which were often far superior to those of private or charity schools.

In 1901, the London School Board had exactly one medical officer, and in 1903, there were 352 centres of instruction.

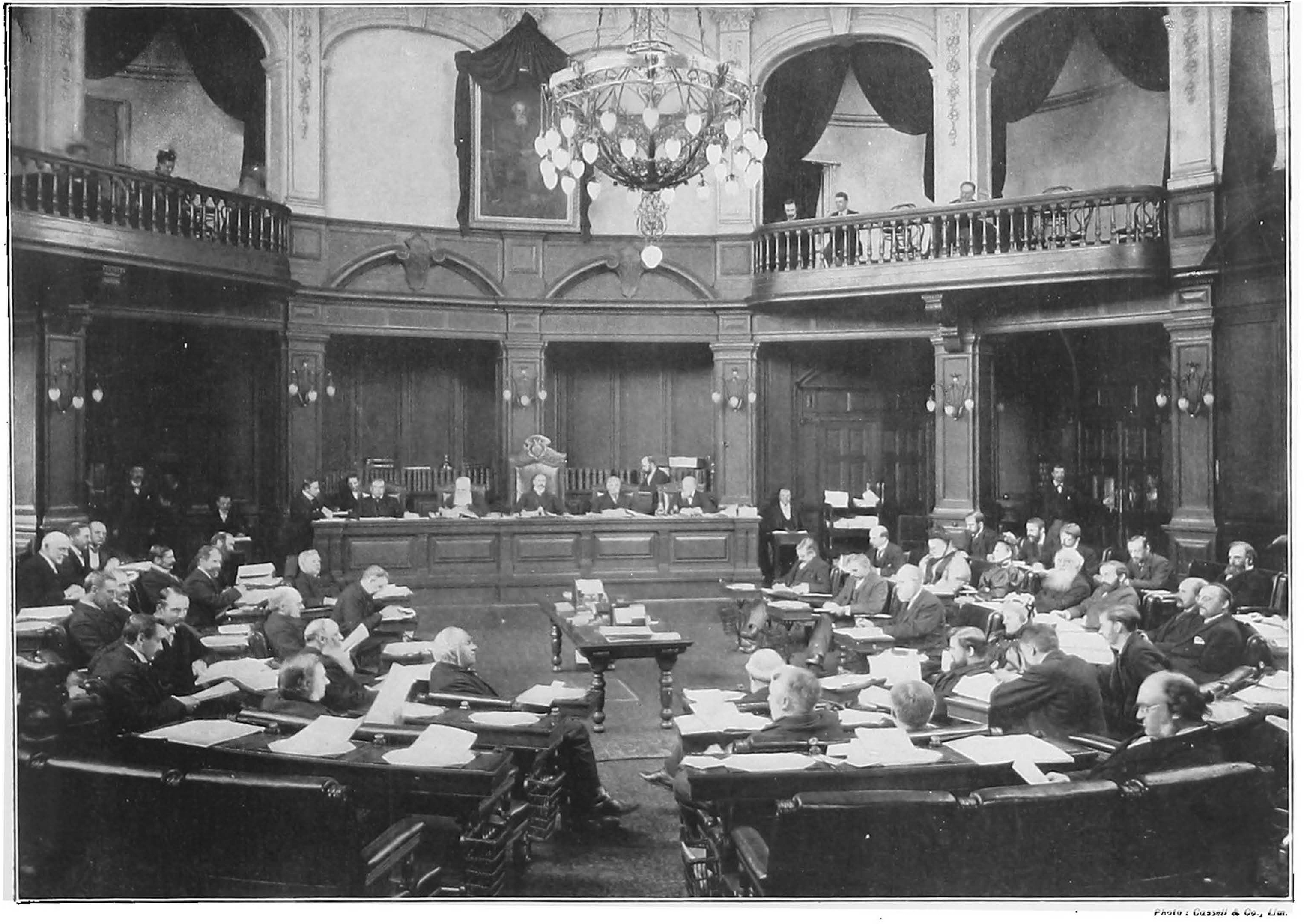
The board in session (c 1895)

The board was responsible for constructing over four hundred schools across London. An important figure in this process was Edward Robert Robson, the board's first chief architect. Robson was responsible for designing many of the school buildings erected by the board. The board's policy was to construct schools which would be attractive, and would serve to improve the general appearance of the districts in which they were constructed. Although school board architecture drew a considerable amount of criticism at the time, the schools were often sturdy and practical structures, and many schools constructed during this period are still in use.

== Abolition of the board ==
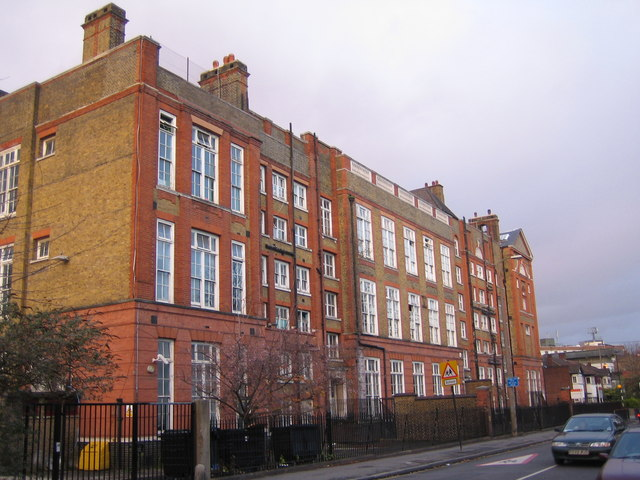
Sigdon Road School (1898), Hackney, now Brook Community Primary School

Although the school boards had been largely successful in increasing the number of children attending school in Britain, they were perceived as bureaucratic and expensive. As a response to this, the boards were abolished by the Education Act 1902, which replaced them with local education authorities.

In London, the London County Council had been created in 1889 to replace the Metropolitan Board of Works and in 1904 the responsibility for education in London was transferred to the LCC. The LSB held its final meeting on 28 April 1904, with the county council taking over on 1 May. The LCC itself was abolished in 1965, with education for the former School Board area passing to the Inner London Education Authority, a committee of the Greater London Council. The ILEA was abolished in 1990, with the inner London borough councils becoming education authorities.

== See also ==
- Birmingham School Board
- List of former board schools in Brighton and Hove
