= Hartog =

Hartog and de/den Hartog(h) are Dutch surnames meaning "(the) duke" (modern Dutch hertog). Hartog is also a Dutch Jewish given name and surname equivalent to German Herzog and Hirsch, derived from hert (Dutch for "deer"). People with these names include:

== Surname ==
=== Hartog ===
- Arie den Hartog (1941–2018), Dutch bicycle racer
- Arno den Hartog (born 1954), Dutch field hockey player
- Ashley Hartog (born 1982), South African footballer
- Cécile Hartog (1857–1940), English Jewish composer and pianist, sister of Héléna, Marcus, Numa Edward, and Philip
- Cornelis den Hartog (1931–2021), Dutch marine botanist
- Diana Hartog (born 1950), Canadian poet and fiction writer
- Dirk Hartog (1580–1621), Dutch sea captain and explorer
  - Named after him: Hartog Plate on Dirk Hartog Island, Western Australia
- Dorcas Denhartog (born 1965), American cross-country skier
- Eva Hartog (born 1988), Dutch journalist
- Fay Hartog-Levin (born 1948), American lawyer, consultant, and diplomat
- François Hartog (born 1946), French historian
- Héléna Hartog (1854–1923), English Jewish portrait painter, sister of Cécile, Marcus, Numa Edward, and Philip
- Henri Hartog, Dutch composer, first conductor of the Hull Philharmonic Orchestra in 1882
- Jacci Den Hartog (born 1962), American sculptor
- Jacob Pieter Den Hartog (1901–1989), Dutch-born American mechanical engineer
- Jan de Hartog (1914–2002), Dutch author
- Jim Hartog (born 1950), American jazz saxophonist
- Joop Hartog (born 1946), Dutch economist and professor
- Lo Hartog van Banda (1916–2006), Dutch comics writer
- Loek Hartog (born 2002), Dutch racing driver
- Lori Den Hartog (born 1980), American politician
- Kristen den Hartog (born 1965), Canadian author
- Madeleine Hartog-Bel (born 1946), Peruvian model, winner of the 1967 Miss World contest
- Marcus Hartog (1851–1924), English Jewish natural historian and educator, brother of Cécile, Héléna, Numa Edward, and Philip
- Marion Hartog (1821–1907), English Jewish author and educator, mother of Cécile, Héléna, Marcus, Numa Edward, and Philip
- Nils den Hartog (born 1994), Dutch footballer
- Numa Edward Hartog (1846–1871), English Jewish mathematician, brother of Cécile, Héléna, Marcus, and Philip
- Philip Hartog (1864–1947), English Jewish chemist and educator, brother of Cécile, Héléna, Marcus, and Numa Edward
- Robbert Hartog (1919–2008), Dutch-Canadian businessman
- Simon Hartog (1940–1992), British filmmaker
- Wil Hartog (born 1948), Dutch motorcycle racer

=== Hartogh ===
- G. A. den Hartogh (born 1943), Dutch philosopher

=== Hartogs ===
- Friedrich Hartogs (1874–1943) – German mathematician
  - Named after him: Hartogs number, Hartogs's extension theorem, and Hartogs' theorem
- Tommie Hartogs (born 1969), Dutch ice hockey player

== Given name ==
- Hartog Elte (1887–1924), Dutch architect
- Georg Hartog Gerson (1788–1844), German physician
- Hartog Hamburger (1887–1924), Dutch diamond polisher and baseball player
- Hartog Jacob Hamburger (1859–1924), Dutch physiologist
- Hartog Keesing (1791–1879), Dutch-born New Zealand shopkeeper
- Hartog Sommerhausen (1781–1853), German-Dutch writer

== See also ==
- Hertog (surname), Dutch surname of the same origin
- Hartog v. Colin & Shields – 1939 case in contract law
- Den Hartog Peak, Antarctic mountain named after glaciologist Stephen Den Hartog
