= Ada Ballin =

English author, journalist, editor, and lecturer

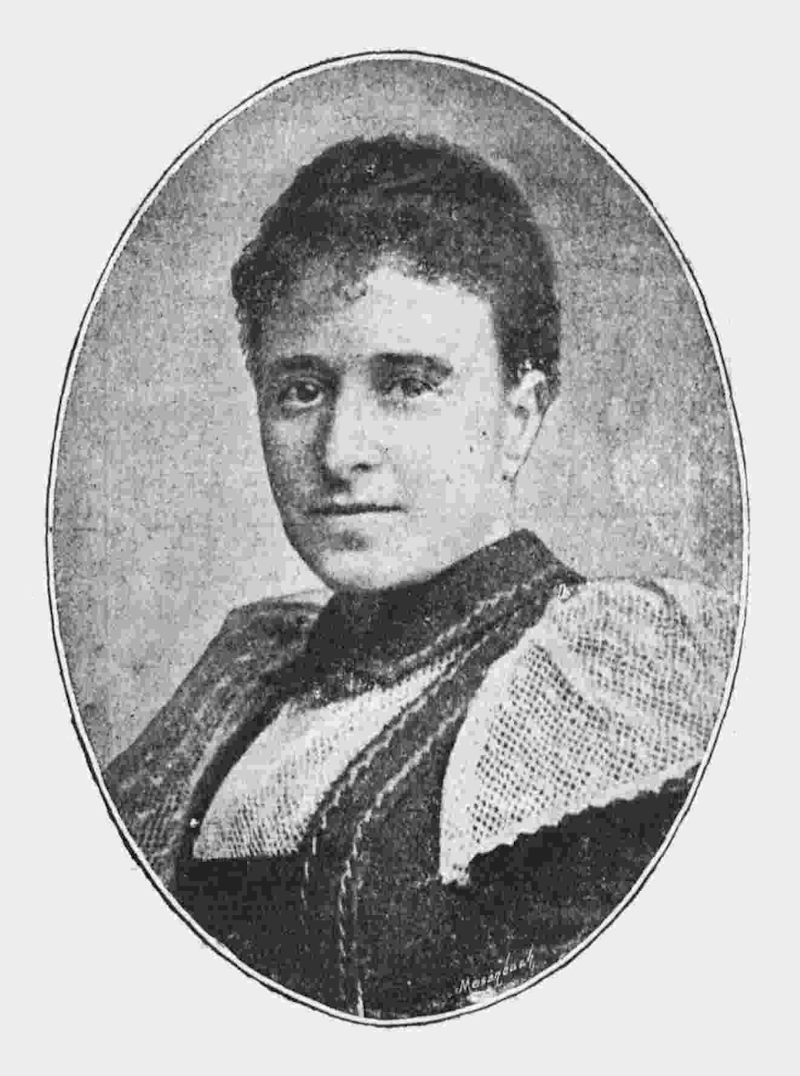
- Born: Ada Sarah Ballin; 4 May 1863; Bloomsbury, London, United Kingdom
- Died: 14 May 1906 (aged 43); Portman Square, London, United Kingdom
- Resting place: Hoop Lane Jewish Cemetery, Golders Green, London
- Education: University College, London
- Spouse(s): Alfred Thomson (m. 1891; div. 1896) Oscar G. D. Berry (m. 1901)
- Writing career
- Notable works: The Science of Dress in Theory and Practice (1885); From Cradle to School (1902)

Ada Sarah Ballin (4 May 1863 – 14 May 1906) was an English author, journalist, editor, and lecturer. She was the editor and proprietor of the magazines Baby, Womanhood and Playtime, and published articles and books on health, child care, and dress reform.

== Biography ==
=== Early life and education ===
Ballin was born in the Bloomsbury neighbourhood of London to Jewish parents Annie (née Moss; c. 1829–1891) and Isaac Ballin (c. 1811–1897). Her father worked as a furrier and merchant in Bristol, before moving to London in 1859 or 1860. Through her mother, Ballin was the niece of Celia Moss Levetus and Marion Hartog, and a first cousin of Numa Edward Hartog, Marcus Hartog, Sir Philip Hartog, Héléna Darmesteter and Hertha Ayrton.

She entered University College, London in 1878—the first year it began admitting women—at the age of 16. Though she was for some time the youngest student, at her entrance she was allowed to join many of the senior classes and in the case of one, was the only girl among thirty male students.

She passed through a successful college career, gaining the prize in the senior Hebrew class (1879), the Hollier Scholarship for Hebrew (1880), Fielden Scholarships in French and German (1880–81), the Heimann Silver Medal for German, an English composition prize, and distinctions in philosophy of mind and logic. She was the first woman to receive the Hollier Scholarship.

During her time there she also studied public health. Among her instructors were Professors George Croom Robertson, William Henry Corfield, and C. M. Campbell.

=== Career ===
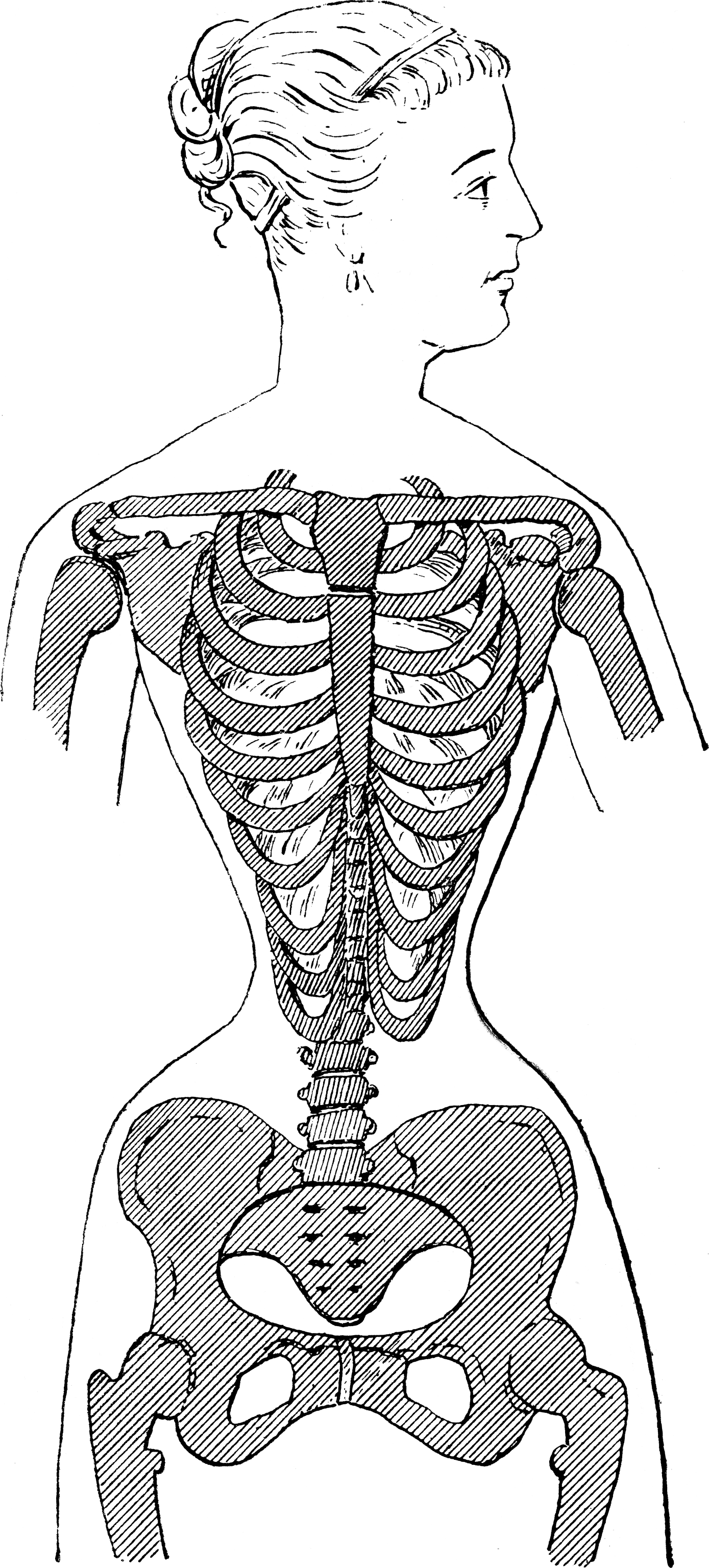
Illustration of a deformed skeleton from her Science of Dress

Ballin's first publication was A Hebrew Grammar with Exercises Selected from the Bible (1881), written conjointly with her younger brother, Francis Louis Ballin. A review in the journal Hebraica praised the book as "a model of beauty so far as execution and arrangement go," but voiced doubts that "the ordinary student will be able to do satisfactory work with this grammar," since "the principles are stated in a confusing and disconnected manner."

In November 1883, she published an article on children's clothing in the journal Health. At the recommendation of William Henry Corfield, Ballin was invited to deliver a lecture on the subject at the International Health Exhibition, which was presented before a crowded audience on 14 July 1884. The National Health Society afterward appointed Ballin to be one of their regular lecturers. She contributed a series of articles on "Healthy Dress" for the newspaper Queen, which afterward formed the bulk of the volume The Science of Dress in Theory and Practice, published by Sampson Low, Marston, Searle, & Rivington at the end of 1885.

Ballin took over from Anna Kingsford as editor of the health and beauty section of the Lady's Pictorial magazine in July 1887. That December, she brought out the first volume of the monthly illustrated journal Baby: The Mothers' Magazine, which took a scientific approach to child rearing. Throughout the 1890s she also wrote and edited a series of pamphlets in the Mothers' Guide series, including How to Feed our Little Ones (1895), Bathing, Exercise and Rest (1896), Early Education (1897), and Children's Ailments (1898). Her work was part of an expanding market for child-care manuals which emphasized the potential dangers facing children, the ignorance of parents, and their need for parenting advice and instructions. Although the principal readers of such manuals were women, Ballin's audience included fathers as well, as revealed by her changing the term "Mother's Parliament" to "Parents' Parliament" in her magazine. The regular and special contributors to Baby were often described as experts in their fields, and Ballin herself emphasized her position as "Lecturer to the National Health Society". In its articles Baby presented itself as a source of scientific expertise and authority, but through its letters section and Ballin's responses to letters, some readers challenged the medicalization of motherhood.

Ballin launched in December 1898 a monthly called Womanhood: The Magazine of Woman's Progress and Interests, Political, Legal, Social, and Intellectual, and of Health and Beauty Culture, aimed at the educated "New Woman," and in December 1900 the periodical Playtime: The Children’s Magazine. The former focused largely on literature, science, health and beauty care, and achievements by women.

Besides her work in the above areas, from 1883 until the death of Richard Proctor in 1888, Ballin contributed a series of articles on the evolution of languages to his paper Knowledge. In the 1890s she also worked as a practitioner of electrolysis for the removal of hairs and blemishes. When interviewed in 1890, Ballin worked at home in London. Her workspace was an "editorial den up in the roof", "far away from all disturbance." It was described as a "characteristic sanctum, full of papers, books, writing materials, and a thousand and one odds and ends, complimentary letters, editors’ epistles, MSS., and all the omnium gatherum which collect round a busy literary man or woman." In 1905 she was described as having consulting rooms at 18 Somerset Street, Portman Square, London.

=== Personal life ===
Ballin married Alfred Thompson, a solicitor of London, on 21 September 1891, and bore a daughter named Annie Isabella the following year. She continued to use her maiden name for professional purposes. They divorced in 1897, and on 25 April 1901 she married Oscar George Daniel Berry, a clerk at the Royal National Lifeboat Institution.

=== Death and legacy ===
Ballin died on 14 May 1906, after falling from a first-floor window of her Portman Square home and becoming impaled on railings below. The death was ruled accidental. A memorial fund at the Great Ormond Street Hospital was established in her honour by a committee that included the Countess de la Warr, the Baroness de Bertouch, the Lord Byron, and Lucie Armstrong, among others.

She bequeathed the management of her periodicals to her brother; Playtime and Womanhood both ceased publication after a year, but Baby continued to be published monthly until 1915.

== Views and reception ==
A number of Ballin's writings focused on themes of dress reform, and, while not formally associated with the Rational Dress Society, she championed many of the group's views. She railed against the use of poisonous dyes and tight lacing, though she did not denounce corsetry completely. Ballin favoured wool, not cotton or linen, and insisted that clothes for babies should cover every part of the body while leaving the arms free.

She also advocated for the use of bifurcated skirts as women's underwear. Underwear was a particularly fraught topic in dress reform, with connotations of both class and morality. Women's underclothing was associated with their sexual accessibility and their virtue or lack thereof. Not wearing physical corsets used to put women at risk of social stigma. In The Science of Dress in Theory and Practice (1885) Ada Ballin wrote that "women—especially women in Society—dread, and have reason to dread, ridicule, and they would endure tortures rather than appear unfashionable." Ballin sought to make clothing healthy while still being fashionable and argued that ignoring fashion would lead to the failure of the dress reform movement. She also acted as a consumer advocate, reporting that "most of the so-called 'hygienic clothing' which we see so largely advertised has no right whatever to the name it claims." She lobbied manufacturers to improve their products and provided information about them to her readers.

Baby was denounced by some medical journals, such as The Lancet, whose journalists were apprehensive of the potential deprofessionalization of medicine. Women's access to medical information was an area of tension, according to one historian, both over the question of whether medical literature was "appropriate" to female readers, and because the male medical establishment felt threatened by the practice of midwifery, the development of nursing as a profession, and public education in the areas of first aid and public health, all of which involved women. Baby was also criticised by the medical profession because of its endorsements, as extensive advertisements and the discussions of Ballin and her readers promoted specific products. The impact of the magazine and of reader's consumer choices is suggested by the entry of the term "Ballin Baby" into common use, to describe children whose parents followed Baby's product recommendations. The phrase may have referred predominantly to the observable aspect of children's clothing, but Ballin's influence on consumers clearly extended beyond clothing to lucrative markets such as baby foods.

== Partial bibliography ==
- Ballin, Ada S.; Ballin, F. L. (1881). A Hebrew Grammar with Exercises Selected from the Bible. London: C. Kegan Paul & Co.
- Ballin, Ada S. (1884). "Children's Dress". The Health Exhibition Literature. Vol. XII. London: William Clowes and Sons. pp. 145–171.
- Ballin, Ada S. (1885). The Science of Dress in Theory and Practice . London: Sampson Low, Marston, Searle, & Rivington.
- Darmesteter, James (1885). The Mahdi, Past and Present. Translated by Ballin, Ada S. London: T. Fisher Unwin. hdl:2027/mdp.39015006568797.
- Ballin, Ada S. (1892). Health and Beauty in Dress: From Infancy to Old Age. London: John Flack.
- Ballin, Ada S. (1894). Personal Hygiene: An Explanation of the Laws of Health as Regards the Individual and the Home. London: F. J. Rebman.
- Ballin, Ada S. (1895). How to Feed Our Little Ones. London: Baby: The Mother's Magazine.
- Ballin, Ada S.; Welldon, Elinor A. (1912) [1896]. The Kindergarten System Explained (2nd ed.). London: F. L. Ballin.
- Ballin, Ada S. (1896). Bathing, Exercise, and Rest. London: Baby: The Mother's Magazine.
- Ballin, Ada S. (1897). Early Education. London: Baby: The Mother's Magazine.
- Ballin, Ada S., ed. (1900). Nursery Cookery. London: F. L. Ballin.
- Ballin, Ada S. (1902). From Cradle to School: A Book for Mothers. London: Archibald Constable & Co.
