= Hertha Ayrton =

English electrical engineer (1854–1923)

- Portrait of Hertha Ayrton from IET archives
- Born: Phoebe Sarah Marks; 28 April 1854; Portsea, Portsmouth, Hampshire, England
- Died: 26 August 1923 (aged 69); Bexhill-on-Sea, Sussex, England
- Education: University of London; Girton College, Cambridge; Finsbury Technical College
- Known for: Electric arc research sand ripple experiments Ayrton anti-gas fan Line-divider
- Spouse: William Edward Ayrton (m. 1885; died 1908)
- Children: Barbara Bodichon Ayrton (born 1886; died 1950)
- Awards: Hughes Medal (1906)
- Scientific career
- Fields: Electrical engineer, mathematician, physicist, inventor

Hertha Ayrton (born Phoebe Sarah Marks; 28 April 1854 – 26 August 1923) was a British electrical engineer, physicist, mathematician, inventor and suffragist. Her research on electric arc lighting and the formation of sand ripples earned her the Royal Society's Hughes Medal in 1906. During the First World War, she invented a fan designed to clear poison gas from the trenches.

She studied mathematics at Girton College, Cambridge, but was not granted a Cambridge degree because the university did not award them to women at the time. Instead, she received a Bachelor of Science degree from the University of London in 1881. Three years later, she patented a mathematical drawing instrument known as a line-divider. She was granted 26 patents in her lifetime.

In 1893, Ayrton began studying why carbon arc lamps, then widely used for street lighting, were prone to hissing and flickering. She discovered the hissing resulted from oxygen coming into contact with the carbon rod and she developed a mathematical relationship between the current, voltage, and length of an electric arc, known as the Ayrton Equation. She published her findings in a series of articles in The Electrician between 1895 and 1896 and in her book The Electric Arc (1902), which remained a standard text until after the First World War.

Ayrton's research expanded beyond electric arcs in 1901, when she became interested in sand ripples during a stay in Margate. She wanted to understand how the first ridge formed and how moving water produced regular patterns in the sand. Her experiments showed that ripples could develop on level sand without any pre-existing irregularities, contrary to earlier explanations. Some of her conclusions were disputed, particularly her mathematical treatment of water movement.

Germany began using poison gas on the Western Front in April 1915." At the time, Allied soldiers had no reliable way to protect themselves from the new weapon. Ayrton began looking for ways to clear the gas from the trenches, where it would build up. Drawing on her earlier research on vortices (swirling movements) in water, she invented a hand-operated fan, known as the Ayrton Fan, for dispersing poison gas. The British Army supplied 104,000 fans, although their effectiveness against gas attacks was questioned.

In 1899, Ayrton became the first woman to read a paper to the Institution of Electrical Engineers (IEE) and was elected its first female member. In 1904, she became the first woman nominated as a Fellow of the Royal Society, but was rejected because she was married. She nevertheless delivered a paper of her own to the Society in 1904, the first woman to do so.

Ayrton was active in the women's suffrage movement. She belonged to the Central Society for Women's Suffrage, the Women's Social and Political Union (WSPU), and served as a vice-president of the United Suffragists and the National Union of Women's Suffrage Societies. She also supported women's educational and professional opportunities through several organisations.

== Early life and education ==
Ayrton was born Phoebe Sarah Marks on 28 April 1854 in Portsea, a suburb of Portsmouth, England. She was the third of the eight children in the family of the seamstress Alice Theresa Moss, daughter of a glass merchant in Portsea, and Levi Marks, a Jewish watchmaker. Levi had fled his native Poland to escape antisemitic persecution under tsarist rule. The family struggled financially and her father died in 1861 when Marks was seven. He left his widow with seven children and an eighth on the way. Her mother supported the family with needlework, while Sarah Marks helped look after her younger siblings.

In 1863, at the age of nine, Marks moved to London to live with her maternal aunt Marion Hartog and her husband, Alphonse, who ran a school in Islington. Her mother supported the move, as she recognized Marks' intelligence and believed that girls needed a better education than boys because their lives were harder. At the Hartogs' school Ayrton studied French and music, but also learned mathematics and Latin from her first cousins who also studied there. At sixteen, Marks became a live-in governess in London and sent money home to her family. Her cousins, all of whom achieved academic success, included Marcus Hartog, a zoologist, Numa Edward Hartog, a mathematician, Philip Hartog, a chemist, Héléna Arsène Darmesteter, a portrait painter, and Cécile Hartog, a composer and pianist.

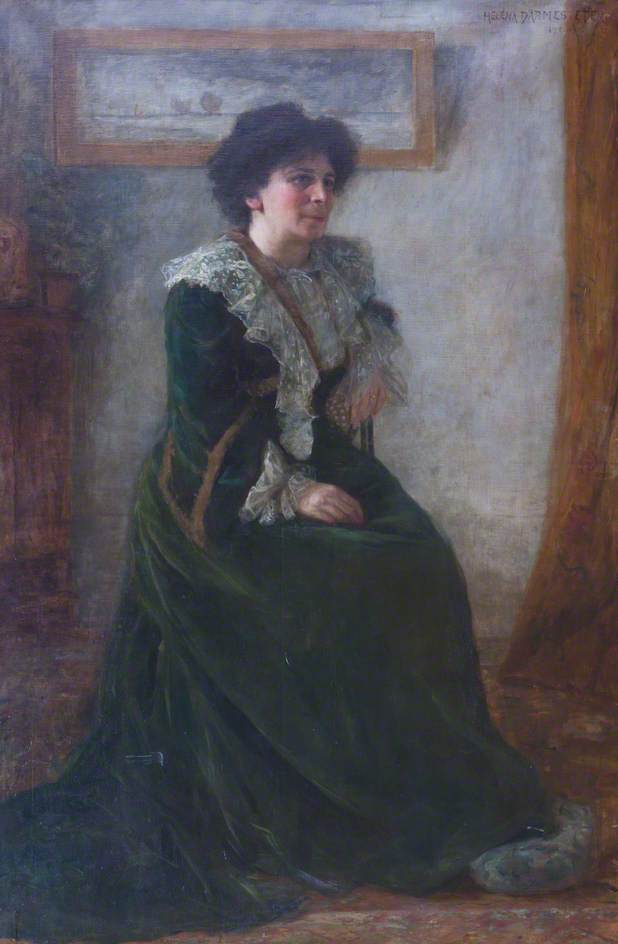
Portrait of Hertha Ayrton by her maternal cousin Héléna Arsène Darmesteter, held in the collection of Girton College, Cambridge

Raised in the Jewish tradition, she became an agnostic in her teens but remained proud of her Jewish heritage throughout her life.

Around this time, she became friends with Ottile Blind, daughter of the German émigré writer Karl Blind. Blind gave Marks the nickname "Hertha", which she then adopted as a symbol of her independence. Some sources say that the name came from Algernon Charles Swingburne's poem Hertha, while others trace it to the heroine of Fredrika Bremer's novel of the same name. Marks and Blind remained lifelong friends, attended suffrage meetings together, and helped each other prepare for the Cambridge entrance examination.

In 1873, Blind introduced Marks to Barbara Bodichon, a feminist who had co-founded Girton College, Cambridge, the first residential college for women in England, in 1869. Bodichon became her most important mentor. After interviewing Marks, she paid for advanced mathematics lessons and urged her to apply to Girton. Bodichon in turn introduced Marks to author George Eliot (Mary Ann Evans), who became a friend and financial backer. In an 1875 letter, Eliot described her efforts to raise the money Marks needed for Girton. At the time, Eliot was writing Daniel Deronda (1876). Some say that Marks was a model for Mirah, a young Jewish singer who shared her dark curly hair, distinctive voice and Jewish background.

=== Girton College ===
In 1875, Marks passed the Cambridge University entrance exam for women, receiving honours in both English and mathematics. She sat for the Girton scholarship exam in 1876, but failed to qualify for a scholarship. The annual cost of £92 a year was beyond her means. The suffragist Helen Taylor lent her £25 a year and Bodichon, Eliot, Lady Lousia Sophia Goldsmid and others covered the rest. Marks entered Girton in October 1876 to study mathematics, becoming the first Jewish woman to attend the university.

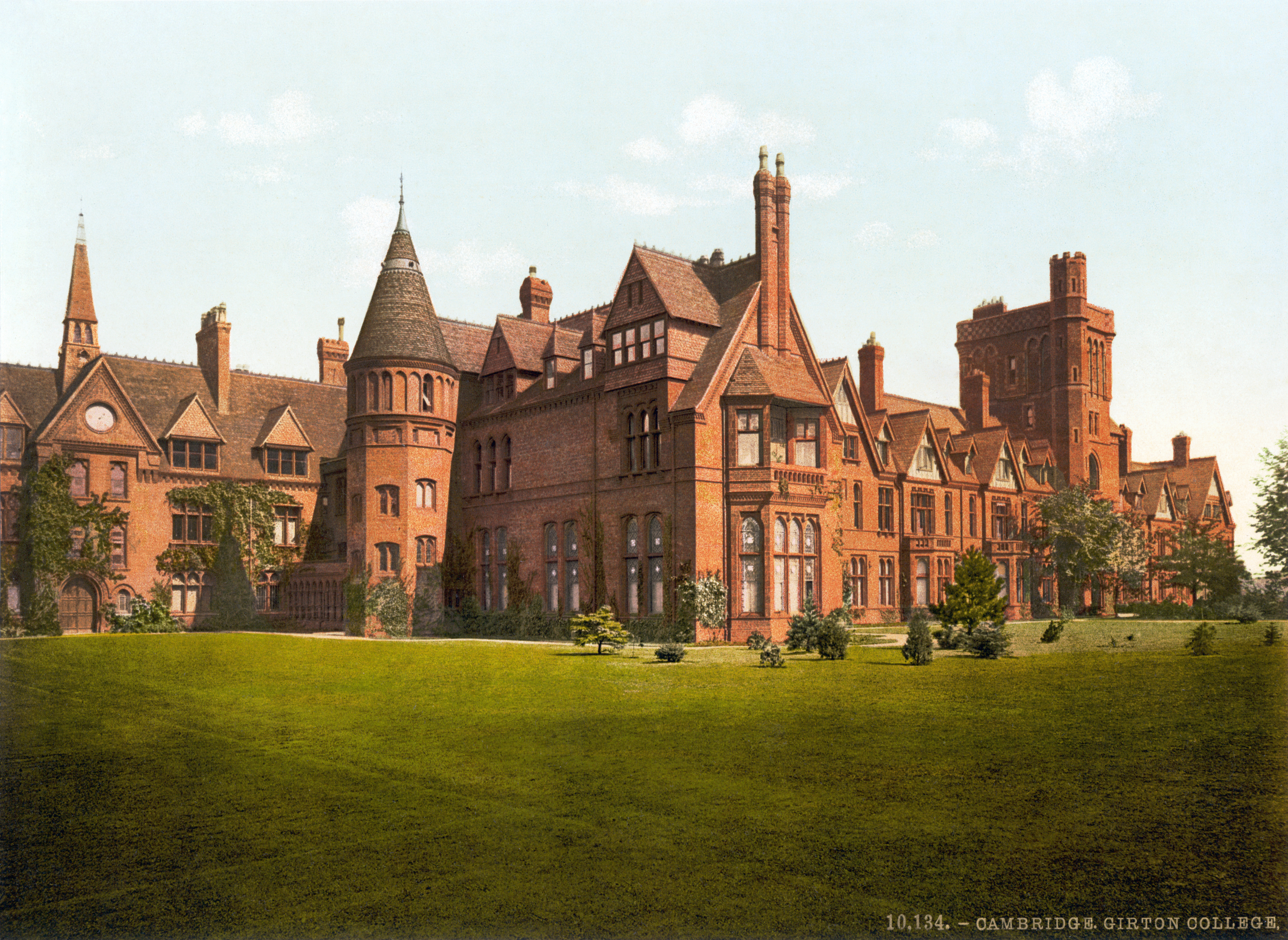
Girton College in the 1890s

Although Girton College admitted students from different religious backgrounds, it had daily prayers and Sunday services, neither of which was mandatory. Marks later recalled religious divisions among students, particularly between evangelicals and those opposed to clerical influence.

At Girton, Marks was tutored for the Mathematics Tripos by Richard Glazebrook, a Cambridge maths graduate and physicist. Her studies were repeatedly interrupted by illness, and she temporarily left Girton in January 1877 before returning that October. She also took embroidery commissions to support her family. In December 1877, Marks achieved a first-class result in the Previous Examination, a preliminary Cambridge examination known as the "Little Go".

Girton College Fire Brigade, 1901

Marks threw herself into college life. She led the Choral Society and established the Girton College Fire Brigade, whose members trained to respond to fires. In 1878, she and fellow students Charlotte Scott, Margaret Ker and Helen Sheldon started a mathematics club to solve problems and discuss mathematical questions. She also began publishing problems and solutions in "Mathematical Questions and Their Solutions" from the Educational Times, and continued doing so for nearly 20 years. While at Girton, she also developed and built a sphygmomanometer, an instrument designed to measure the pulse. It used a watch spring fastened over an artery at the wrist, with a marker that moved with the pulse and recorded its movement on paper drawn beneath it.

Marks took the Tripos examinations in 1880 and was placed in the third class. Illness had affected her studies and she later wrote to Bodichon expressing her disappointment with her result. Cambridge did not grant degrees to women at the time, and Marks was not granted a degree or certificate for her exam performance.She instead took the University of London's external examinations and received a Bachelor of Science degree from there in 1881. Nevertheless, she continued to be involved at Girton after graduation, serving as the certified students' representative on the college committee from 1886 to 1892.

== Scientific career ==
=== Early teaching and mathematical invention ===
After returning to London, Marks supported herself by teaching mathematics at Notting Hill and Ealing High School, giving private lessons, and performing embroidery. She also ran a club for working women, gave singing classes to laundry workers, and helped care for her sister Winnie.

While studying at Girton College, Marks had begun working on a mathematical instrument known as a line-divider, used for dividing lines into multiple equal parts and for scaling figures up or down. In February 1883, her cousin Ansel Leo showed her an illustration of a drawing instrument made from a series of parallelograms. The two tried to improve it together, but their efforts were unsuccessful, and Marks developed her own design. While it was primarily developed for artists, it proved useful to architects and engineers. She received a British patent for Improvements in Mathematical Dividing Instruments in March 1884, with financial assistance from Bodichon and Lady Goldsmid. A US patent, filed under the name Phoebe Sarah Marks on 3 May 1884, was granted on 6 January 1885.

The London firm, W. F. Stanley and Company, made the instrument in three sizes, and it was shown at the Loan Exhibition of Women's Industries in Bristol in 1885. The instrument received favourable reviews from scientific publications. Nature praised its usefulness for architects and engineers, while the French journal Revue Scientifique called it "a mathematical proof" that women could invent.n February 1885, Marks presented "The Uses of a Line-Divider" to the Physical Society and Philosophical Magazine reprinted the paper. The line-divider was the first of her 26 patents, including five for mathematical dividers, eight related to the movement of air, and thirteen for arc lamps and electrodes.

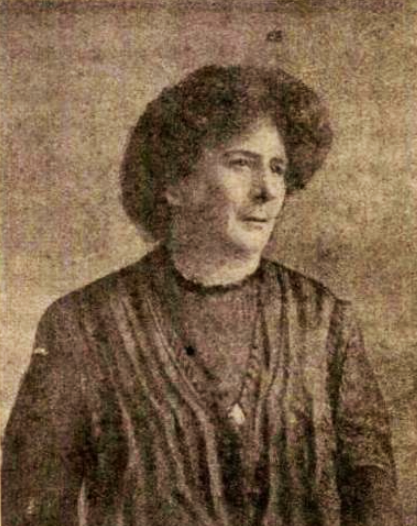
Hertha Ayrton in Bengali literary magazine Prabaasi Patrika 1921

Unlike fields such as botany and natural history, electrical engineering had few women. They faced barriers to obtaining the training and laboratory facilities needed for experimental research. In 1884, Marks began studying electricity and physics at the evening classes provided by Finsbury Technical College. She was one of only three women in contrast to 188 men. Her teacher was William Edward Ayrton, an electrical engineer and Fellow of the Royal Society. Marks married William in 1885. By then, he had become a professor of electrical engineering at the Central Technical College in South Kensington, which later became a part of Imperial College. Through her marriage, Ayrton gained access to William's laboratories, assistants, and professional contacts. Although they generally pursued their research independently, unlike her husband, Ayrton never received a salary for her scientific work. At the time, middle-class women were generally expected to do scientific work without pay, as a form of service rather than a job.

Despite these opportunities, domestic duties and poor health impacted Ayrton's active research work for several years. She nevertheless gave lectures for women on electricity in 1888. When Bodichon died in 1891, she left Ayrton an inheritance that allowed her to support her mother and hire a housekeeper, leaving her more time for her scientific research.

=== Electric arc research ===
The carbon arc lamp was the first commercially practical form of electric lighting. By the 1890s, electric arc lamps were widely used for street lighting and in public buildings, increasingly replacing gas lighting. They produced light by passing an electrical current between two carbon rods, one positive and one negative, separated by a small gap. The intense heat vaporised carbon from the positive rod, forming a luminous crater at the tip that produced most of the lamp's light. However, arc lamps were prone to hissing and flickering. Moreover, as the carbon rods burned away over time, the distance between them increased, which required constant adjustments to maintain a steady electrical arc. Despite considerable industrial and commercial interest in improving arc lighting, scientists didn't fully understand the causes of these problems.

Arc lamp carbons

In 1893, William Ayrton attended the Electrical Congress in Chicago to present research on electric arcs, including experiments conducted by his wife. While William was away, Ayrton supervised the ongoing experiments at Central Technical College in South Kensington, with help from his students and assistants. The only copy of his paper was accidentally destroyed and he decided not to rewrite it. Ayrton took over the research, initially repeating his experiments and then expanding them in new directions. William subsequently turned to other work, partly because he believed that any work they published together would be credited to him. The tendency to overlook women's scientific contributions or credit their work to men is known as the Matilda effect. < Ayrton studied how changes in voltage, current, distance between rods, and differences in their shape, size, and material affected the arc. She found that hissing occurred when the crater on the positive carbon rod grew beyond its tip and extended onto its side, where it came into contact with oxygen in the air. Her experiments showed that excluding oxygen prevented the hissing and allowed the lamp to produce a steadier light. She also developed a mathematical relationship between current, potential difference (voltage) and arc length (the distance between rods), known as the Ayrton Equation.

Between 1895 and 1896, Ayrton published twelve articles on the electric arc in The Electrician, a leading electrical engineering periodical. She also presented papers on the arc at several meetings of the British Association for the Advancement of Science throughout the 1890s. On 23 March 1899, she presented "The Hissing of the Electric Arc" before the Institution of Electrical Engineers (IEE), becoming the first woman to present a paper to the institution. It was received enthusiastically by the organisation's president Joseph Swan, who expressed hope that she would become a member of the IEE.

Ayrton's lectures attracted attention in the popular press, where reports often emphasized her sex and appearance rather than her scientific findings. An account of her 1899 presentation to the IEE described her as a "little dark-haired, dark-eyed lady" who "created a sensation." Historian Claire G. Jones notes that descriptions of her appearance reflected contemporary associations with Jewishness and femininity. Historians James Tattersall and Shawnee McMurran wrote that although many of her scientific colleagues respected her abilities, newspaper coverage often treated her presence in electrical engineering as a novelty.

Two months later, she was elected the IEE's first woman member. Rather than following the usual admission process, Ayrton was elected under a provision allowing the IEE Council to admit individuals whose membership it considered beneficial to the institution, regardless of their formal qualifications or employment. She also received a £10 prize for her paper, formally presented that November. Ayrton remained its only full female member until her death. The next woman was not elected until 1958.

In 1900, she lectured in French on the luminous intensity of direct-current arcs at the International Electrical Congress in Paris. Her cousin Marcus Hartog later used the lecture to convince the British Association for the Advancement of Science to allow women on its committees. Ayrton compiled her research into her book, The Electric Arc, in 1902 which became a standard text in commmon use until after the First World War.

Ayrton's research helped improve street lighting, searchlights, movie projectors, and general arc lamp technology. From 1905 to 1910, she worked on searchlight carbons for the British Admiralty and the War Office. At her suggestion, the Admiralty started to shape the tips of negative carbons at the factory, reducing the time needed to produce a steady light after replacing the rods in searchlights from twenty minutes or more to forty seconds.

Later, she invented and patented a small diameter negative carbon rod with a slow-burning core and a copper coating that prevented oxygen from reaching the sides, which then created a stable burning arc and significantly improved the function of searchlights and movie projectors.

=== Ripple marks and fluid dynamics ===
Ayrton began studying sand ripples in 1901 while staying in Margate, where she had accompanied her husband who was recovering from an illness. During walks on the beach, she became interested in the ridges and grooves formed in the sand by moving water. Ayrton wanted to understand how ripples first formed and why they developed into regular patterns. She began experimenting with sand and water in household containers including a zinc bath, soap dishes and pudding basins. After returning to London, she continued the work using glass tanks of different sizes. Some were mounted on rollers and rocked by an electric motor to imitate the motion of waves.

Sand ripples

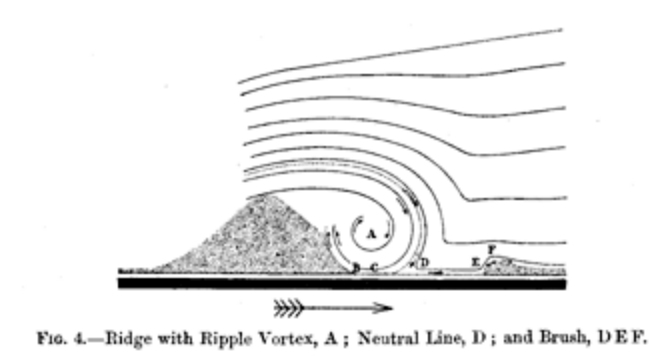
Figure from "The Origin and Growth of Ripple-mark"

George Darwin, the son of Charles Darwin, had previously studied the formation of sand ripples and the vortices produced by moving water. He proposed that ripples began with irregularities in the sand, which water currents and vortices gradually increased. Ayrton questioned whether such irregularities were necessary for the first ripple to form. In experiments with level sand, she observed that oscillating water could create an initial ridge without an existing irregularity. She attributed the formation of the first ridge to the back-and-forth movement of water over the sand. Once the first ridge had formed, vortices carried sand towards neighbouring ridges, allowing a regular pattern to develop. Ayrton used substances including soaked black pepper and crystals of potassium permanganate to make the currents visible and observed how vortices shifted as the water changed direction. She presented her work to the British Association in 1904, the Physical Society in 1907 and to the Société Française de Physique in Paris in 1911.

Her conclusions received a mixed response from other scientists. Mathematician Horace Lamb praised Ayrton's experiments but argued that her explanation didn't sufficiently account for the viscosity of water. Another contemporary, John Joly, questioned whether her experiments supported her conclusions about ripple formation in steadily flowing water. Her mathematical model also failed to account fully for the effects of turbulence in moving water.

After he husband died in November 1908, she lost access to the laboratory and equipment at Central Technical College, in spite of her established scientific reputation. She continued her research in the large drawing room of her home, which she turned into a laboratory. According to historian Claire G. Jones, the domestic setting restricted her experimental work and led some of her scientific peers to question the accuracy of her methods and reliability of her equipment.

=== World War I Inventions ===
After German forces released chlorine gas at Ypres in April 1915, killing thousands of soldiers and injuring many others, Ayrton began investigating whether her research on water currents and vortices could help disperse the gas. At the time of the attack, Allied soldiers had no working gas masks and resorted to makeshift protection, such as cloths soaked in water and "respirators" constructed out of lint and tape. Chlorine damages the lungs and could cause suffocation. Since it was heavier than air, the gas would collect in trenches and dugouts.

In May, she constructed a miniature battlefield, complete with trenches, in one of the sand tanks in her home laboratory. She used smoke from burning paper to stimulate poison gas and experimented with a hand-operated fan that sent out a puff of air when struck against a hard surface, which formed vortices intended to push the gas back.ref name="Leendertz-Ford1999-1" details="p. 157" /> By the middle of the month, she had created a working model, which she was able to test in the back garden of her friend and fellow suffragist Ernestine Mills. Known as the Ayrton Fan, the device consisted of waterproof canvas stiffened with cane and attached to a hickory handle. It weighed under a pound and folded to fit behind a soldier's pack. In 1915, she submitted the design to the Inventions Committee of the British Army's General Headquarters. The War Office initially rejected it and there was a public debate in the press. Supporters appealed to David Lloyd George and Douglas Haig, and a trial eventually was held at Helfaut, France. In May 1916, the first batch of 5,000 fans were sent to France, along with Ayrton's assistant, who went to train the troops on how to use them. The British Army eventually issued 104,000 fans and the United States Army ordered 50,000 more in 1918.

The early hand-operated fans had several limitations, including an inability to function effectively in winds above nine miles per hour. Ayrton developed a mechanically operated version designed for stronger winds in 1917. She described the invention in "On a New Method of Driving off Poisonous Gases," published in the Proceedings of the Royal Society A in 1919.

The effectiveness of the fans remained disputed. Although they were issued to clear poisonous gas from trenches, dugouts, and shell holes, military assessments questioned their usefulness against gas attacks. In May 1920, Major H. A. Sisson, a former member of the Royal Engineers, wrote a letter to The Times stating that the fans had been ineffective against gas attacks in the front. Later that month, Winston Churchill, the Secretary of State for War, told Parliament that the Army had adopted the fans for clearing trenches and dugouts after gas clouds had passed, rather than for repelling approaching attacks. Ayrton defended the fans against criticism and complained about delays in supplying them to troops.

Ayrton continued her research into air movement and vortices after the war. Her later research explored the use of mechanically driven fans to improve ventilation, including the removal of harmful gases from mines, sewers, and factories. She continued experimenting with the principles behind the fan until her death in 1923.

=== The Royal Society ===
In June 1899, Ayrton was the only woman exhibitor at the Royal Society's annual conversazione, where she demonstrated an electric arc in enclosed gas. Two years later, John Perry presented her paper "The Mechanism of the Electric Arc" to the Royal Society, as women were not then allowed to present their own papers. It was the first time a woman's paper had been read before the body. In January 1920, Perry and several other Fellows nominated Ayrton for membership, making her the first woman nominated for fellowship. The Society's council sought legal advice and declined her admission after being advised that not only were married women ineligible, the eligibility of unmarried women was also doubtful. The Society's president, William Huggins, also opposed admitting women.

Nevertheless, in 1904, Ayrton became the first woman to deliver a paper of her own at a Royal Society meeting, presenting her research on sand ripples. Her paper, "The Origin and Growth of Ripple-Mark", was published in the Proceedings of the Royal Society A in 1910. Six of her papers were presented to the Royal Society during her lifetime, with a seventh presented posthumously in 1926. In 1906, the Society awarded her its Hughes Medal for her investigations into the electric arc and sand ripples, making her the first woman to receive the award. Unlike fellowship, eligibility for the medal was not restricted by sex. Still, it would be 102 years before another woman would win the Hughes Medal. It has since been awarded to Michele Dougherty (2008), Clare Grey (2020), and Linda Faye Nazar (2024).

Exclusion from membership restricted Ayrton's access to scientific research. She wrote to the Royal Society's president, Sir Archibald Geikie, in 1910 requesting permission to receive unpublished papers, a privilege available to Fellows. She explained that the lack of access had put her at a "great disadvantage". Although the Sex Disqualification (Removal) Act of 1919 removed the legal grounds for excluding women, the Society did not elect its first female Fellows until 1945, when biochemist Marjory Stephenson and crystallographer Kathleen Lonsdale were admitted.

== Woman's suffrage and public life ==
Ayrton joined the Hampstead branch of the Central Society for Women's Suffrage in 1872. In London, at the 1899 International Congress of Women, she chaired the session on physical science. She spoke at the annual convention of the National Union of Women's Suffrage Societies (NUWSS) in 1905 and subscribed to the London Society for Women's Suffrage the following year. In 1907, she joined the more radical Women's Social and Political Union (WSPU). Ayrton made regular donations to the organisation and was one of the WSPU's largest financial contributors, donating more than £1,000 a year in 1909-10, 1910-11 and 1912-13.

In May 1909, Ayrton opened the second day of the WSPU's Women's Exhibition in Knightsbridge, where she expressed her support for militant suffrage tactics. Featuring 50 stalls and new model bicycles painted in the suffrage colors of purple, white and green, the exhibition raised £5,664 for the movement.

Women's Coronation Procession, 1911

On 18 November 1910, she took part in the demonstrations known as Black Friday, joining a deputation of approximately 300 women led by Emmeline Pankhurst that sought a meeting with Prime Minister H. H. Asquith. When Asquith refused to meet with members of the deputation, Pankhurst took Ayrton and physician Elizabeth Garrett Anderson to meet with his private secretary, Vaughan Nash, who told them he had no authority to act. The three women returned to the larger protest, where demonstrators continued trying to enter Parliament and faced violent confrontations with police. Ayrton later wrote to The Times that a policeman had attempted to strangle her as she followed Pankhurst towards Downing Street. During the 1911 census boycott, she hosted approximately forty resisters at her home at 41 Norfolk Square and left the household census form incomplete. That June, she marched in the science section of the Women's Coronation Procession in London, which included 800 women graduates in academic dress.

Ayrton's home at 41 Norfolk Square, London

Ayrton also helped the WSPU financially and provided refuge for imprisoned suffragettes. In 1912, she allowed the organisation to transfer funds into her bank account to protect them from government seizure. She also hosted the WSPU's Speakers Class at her home, where her cousin and fellow suffragette Rosa Leo, Honorary Instructor in Voice Production, trained women in the art of speaking outdoors. Under the 1913 Prisoners (Temporary Discharge for Ill Health) Act, known as the "Cat and Mouse Act," she housed suffragettes, including Pankhurst, released from prison after hunger strikes. In 1914, Ayrton donated £100 to help establish the United Suffragists, an organisation open to both men and women. She became a vice-president.

After women gained the vote in 1918, Ayrton attended suffrage victory celebrations. She remained involved in organisations supporting women's education and scientific work. In a 1919 interview with the Daily News, she argued that scientific achievement should be judged without regard to sex: "Personally I do not agree with sex being brought into science at all. The idea of 'woman and science' is entirely irrelevant. Either a woman is a good scientist, or she is not; in any case she should be given opportunities, and her work should be studied from the scientific, not the sex, point of view." That year, she helped found the International Federation of University Women and was among the first to join the Women's Engineering Society. She also took on the role of vice-president for the British Federation of University Women and helped establish the National Union of Scientific Workers in 1920.

== Personal life ==
=== Marriage and family ===
Ayrton married William Ayrton on 6 May 1885. William was a widower whose first wife, physician Matilda Chaplin Ayrton, had died in 1883. Ayrton became stepmother to his young daughter, Edith Ayrton, and in 1866 gave birth to her daughter, Barbara Bodichon Ayrton, named after her friend and mentor Barbara Bodichon. The Ayrtons also became guardians of Ernestine Mills, an artist and suffragist. The family lived at 41 Norfolk Square in London, where Ayrton maintained a laboratory.

William strongly supported education for women and women's legal rights. He once told Ayrton's cousin Phillip Hartog that the two men were able people, "but Hertha is a genius". He privately called her "BG" for "beautiful genius" and was concerned that working together would lead others to credit him with her discoveries. However, when his health declined, she took over much of his research for the Admiralty on electric searchlights and three of the resulting reports were published under his name alone. Throughout her life, Ayrton put her scientific research on hold to care for sick relatives and friends, including her mother, sister, husband, and Bodichon.

Both daughters became involved in the women's suffrage movement. Edith, who married the writer Israel Zangwill, became a novelist. Her novel The Call (1924) is about a woman scientist and suffragette whose character was based on Ayrton. Barbara was also active in the movement and was imprisoned in Holloway in 1912 for breaking windows during a suffrage protest. Ayrton wrote to a friend about Barbara's imprisonment and said, "I am very proud of her." Barbara later entered Parliament as a Labour MP in 1945.

=== Friendship with Marie Curie ===
Ayrton met Marie Curie in June 1903, when Marie and Pierre Curie visited London for a lecture on radium at the Royal Institution. Although both of them had contributed to the research, Curie sat in the audience while her husband delivered the lecture because women were not allowed to speak at the institution's Friday Night Discourse. Ayrton had faced a similar restriction at the Royal Society in 1901, when a male colleague had to present research on her behalf. She invited the Curies to dinner and the two women became close friends. They later visited each other in London and Paris and corresponded regularly. Curie gave Ayrton inscribed copies of her 1903 doctoral thesis and her 1910 Traité de radioactivité, both now part of the Institution of Engineering and Technoloy (IET) archives. After Pierre Curie's death, British newspapers credited him with discovering radium. Ayrton wrote to the Westminster Gazette in 1909 arguing that "errors are notoriously hard to kill, but an error that ascribes to a man what was actually the work of a woman has more lives than a cat". In the summer of 1912, travelling under the name Sklodowska, Curie and her daughters visited England and spent about two months with Ayrton in a rented house by the sea. During the visit, Ayrton taught mathematics to Curie's daughter Irène. She also persuaded Curie to sign a 1912 international petition for the release of British suffragettes participating in a hunger strike.

== Later years and death ==
After World War I, Ayrton continued her research on vortices and adapted her anti-gas fan to ventilate mines, sewers, and factories. She investigated using motor-driven fans to move air through tubes. Her research notebooks record experiments as late as June 1923, just two months before her death.

On 26 August 1923, Ayrton died at a friend's home in North Lancing, Sussex, at the age of 69. She had developed septicaemia (blood poisoning) after an insect bite became infected. Her final research paper, "Primary and Secondary Vortices in Oscillating Fluids: Their Connection with Skin Friction", was published posthumously in the Proceedings of the Royal Society in 1926. Ayrton bequeathed a large proportion of her estate to the Institution of Electrical Engineers, which had admitted her as its first female member in 1899. In 1924, her daughter Barbara Ayrton Gould submitted a claim for compensation for the Admiralty's use of Ayrton's negative-carbon searchlight system.

== Legacy ==
Ayrton's 1902 book, The Electric Arc, remained a standard reference until after World War I. Her equation was the first known mathematical model of a steady arc and became the basis for later models developed by Charles Steinmetz and W.B. Nottingham. In the early 1930s, the engineers Van and Warrington tested her formula and confirmed that an arc's voltage decreases as the current increases. The Ayrton Equation and its later variations are still used to study direct-current arcs, although each has limits on the conditions it can describe.

Ayrton's mathematical explanation of sand ripples did not fully account for turbulence. Her experiments, however, were unusually thorough for their time and similar studies were not carried out until the 1940s. Modern researchers continue to cite her work when studying how vortices shape underwater sand ripples. In 2025, the geologist Danita Brandt noted that Ayrton remained relatively unknown among geologists despite her recognition in electrical engineering.

Ayrton's death was widely reported in the British press. The Times described her as a "distinguished woman scientist" and the Manchester Guardian praised her independent research on electric arc lighting. Her obituary in Nature, written by the chemist Henry Edward Armstrong, took a different view. Armstrong questioned her scientific abilities and suggested that her husband would have accomplished more if he had married a "humdrum wife" who attended to his domestic needs. The physician H. H. Mills and the electrical engineer Thomas Mather challenged his account in letters to Nature. In 2021, Danita Brandt criticized the obituary for its sexism and antisemitism.

In 1925, Ayrton's longtime friend, Ottilie Hancock (née Blind), endowed the Hertha Ayrton Science Fellowship at Girton College of the University of Cambridge. The following year, the journalist and suffragist Evelyn Sharp published Hertha Ayrton: A Memoir. In January 2018, Ayrton was featured in an episode of BBC Radio 4's Great Lives. Ayrton's friendship with Marie Curie was the subject of Lauren Gunderson's 2019 play The Half-Life of Marie Curie. That year, Ripple-Marked Radiance, a tapestry by Girton College artist-in-residence Yelena Popova and inspired by Ayrton's paper "The Origin and Growth of Ripple-Mark," was unveiled at the Storey's Field Centre in Eddington, Cambridge. In 2022, Jessy Randall included a poem about Ayrton in her collection Mathematics for Ladies: Poems on Women in Science. In May 2026, The Cambridge First All-Ladies Fire Brigade, a musical inspired by Ayrton's establishment of an all-women fire brigade at Girton College, premiered at Lincoln Arts Centre.

== Commemoration ==
In 1925, two years after Ayrton's death, her lifelong friend Ottilie Hancock endowed a research fellowship in her name at Girton College. The Hertha Ayrton Research Fellowship continues today. In October 2025 Girton admitted Dr. Kate Horan as a Hertha Ayrton Research Fellow in Natural Sciences. Past holders include the geologist Dorothy Helen Rayner (1936-38). The Panasonic Trust also established the Hertha Marks Ayrton Fellowship to support engineers from underrepresented groups undertaking full-time master's degrees in new technology fields. In 2015, the British Society for the History of Science created the Ayrton Prize for internet projects and digital commitment related to the history of science; the first winner was the British Library's Voices of Science. In 1999, the centenary of her election to the Institution of Electrical Engineers was marked by events that included a re-creation of her hissing arc experiment. In 2010, a panel of women scientists and historians selected Ayrton as one of the ten most influential British women in science as part of the Royal Society's 350th anniversary celebrations. Google commemorated Ayrton's 162nd birthday with a Google Doodle on its homepage in 2016. In 2026, the IET and historians marked the 120th anniversary of her Hughes Medal and the centenary of Sharp's memoir with events including a Wikipedia editathon.

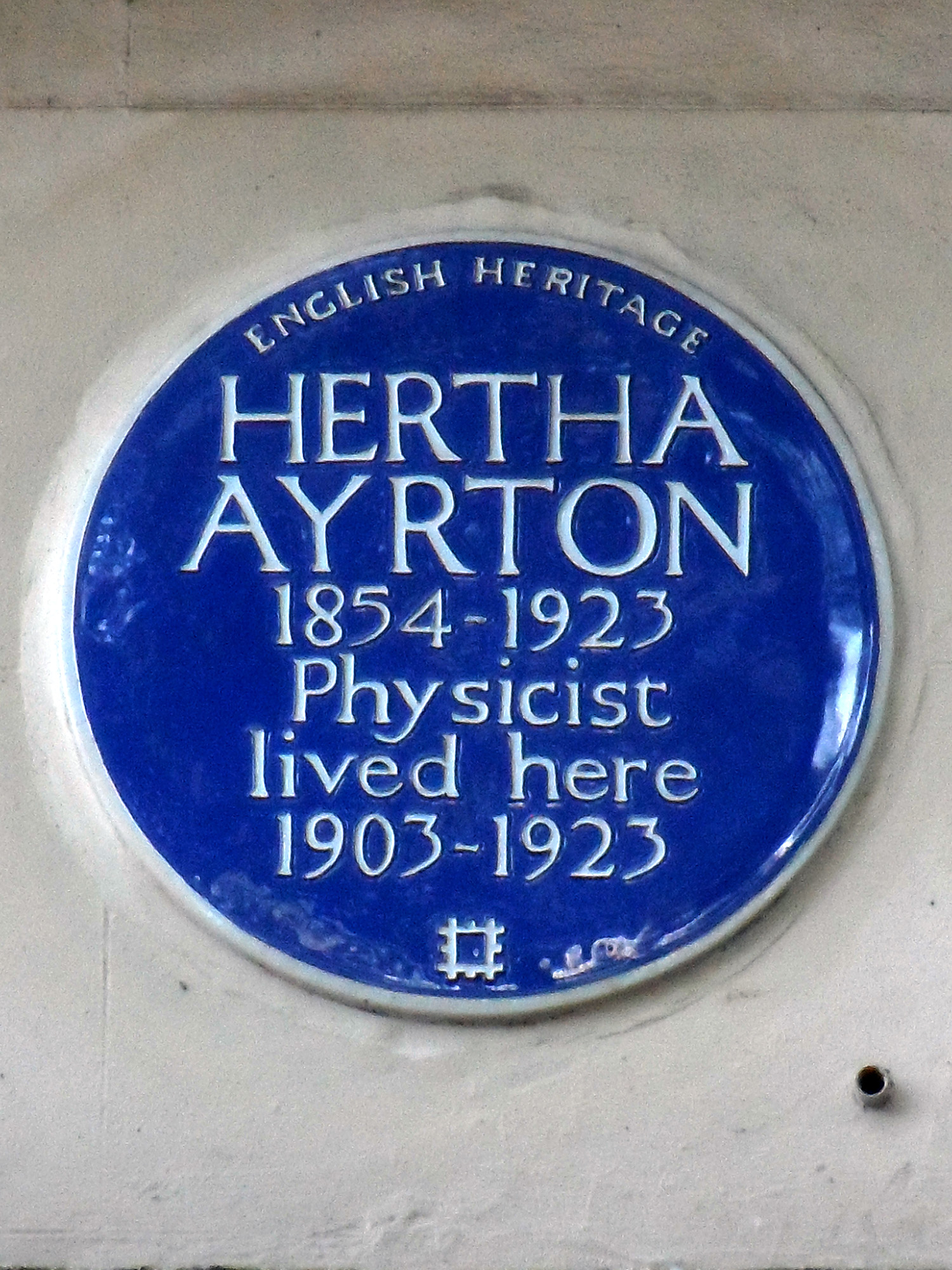
Ayrton's house at 41 Norfolk Square in Paddington received an English Heritage blue plaque in 2007

In 2007, English Heritage posted a blue plaque to commemorate Ayrton at 41 Norfolk Square in Paddington, where Ayrton lived when she invented the Ayrton Fan. Sheffield Hallam University named their new STEM centre after Ayrton in 2017. In 2018, another blue plaque was unveiled at Ayrton's birthplace on Queen Street, Portsmouth, and a ceremony was held at Hertha Ayrton Way on The Hard. In 2019, the UK government launched the Ayrton Fund, with up to £1 billion in aid to help developing countries adopt clean-energy technology. A newly extended berth at Portsmouth International Port (UK) was named the Ayrton Berth in 2021. In 2026, the University of Edinburgh named a teaching room after her in its new School of Engineering building.

== Publications presented to the Royal Society ==
From 1901 to 1926, six papers by Hertha Ayrton were presented to the Royal Society. The first she presented herself was her 1910 paper "The origin and growth of ripple-mark". The seventh was presented after her death through the egis of Thomas Mather F.R.S, a long term collaborator of William Ayrton.

- (1901) "The mechanism of the electric arc"
- (1902) "V. The mechanism of the electric arc"
- (1908) "On the non-periodic or residual motion of water moving in stationary waves"
- (1910) "The origin and growth of ripple-mark", the first to be presented by Hertha Ayrton herself
- (1915) "Local difference of pressure near an obstacle in oscillating water"
- (1919) "On a new method of driving off poisonous gases"
- (1926) "Primary and secondary vortices in oscillating fluids: their connection with skin friction"

== See also ==
- List of women associated with Marie Curie and Irène Joliot-Curie
- Timeline of women in science
