= Hertog (surname) =

Hertog or Den Hertog is a Dutch surname meaning "(the) duke". Other variants include Hertogh, Hertoghe, and Hertogs. Notable people with the surname include:

== Hertog ==
- Alois De Hertog (1927–1993), Belgian racing cyclist
- Damiën Hertog (born 1974), Dutch footballer
- Fedor den Hertog (1946–2011), Dutch racing cyclist
- Roger Hertog (born 1941), American businessman and financier
- Ronald Hertog (born 1989), Dutch paralympic javelin thrower
- Thomas Hertog (born 1975), Belgian theoretical physicist

== Hertogh ==
- Isabelle de Hertogh (born 1972), Belgian film and stage actress
- Maria Hertogh (1937–2009), Dutch woman whose custody trial in 1950 lead to riots in Singapore

== Hertoghe ==
- Alain Hertoghe (born 1959), Belgian journalist
- André Dehertoghe (1941–2016), Belgian runner
- Joanna de Hertoghe (c. 1566–1630), medieval nun in Ghent

== Hertogs ==
- Koos Hertogs (1949–2015), Dutch serial killer

== See also ==
- Hartog, surname of the same origin
- Hertog, Dutch brand of ice cream
- Sign of Hertoghe, medical symptom affecting the eyebrows
