= Bowdich =

Bowdich is an Anglo-Saxon surname that originates in Dorset, England.

Notable people with the surname include:

- David Bowdich (born 1969), American law enforcement officer
- Evelyne Webb Bowdich (1861–1930), English writer
- Sarah Bowdich Lee (née Wallis) (1791–1866), English author, illustrator, traveller, and zoologist
- Thomas Edward Bowdich (1791–1824), English traveller and author
