= E. C. Rhodes =

Edmund Cecil Rhodes (1892–1964), a statistician, was born in Yorkshire and named after Cecil Rhodes. He went to Bradford Grammar School and Trinity College, Cambridge, where he graduated as Wrangler (B-star) in 1914. In 1924 he became reader at the London School of Economics, where he remained until he retired in 1958. He wrote for Biometrika and the Journal of the Royal Statistical Society, and Edgeworth called him a "pathbreaker" (see obituary by Grebenik).

Rhodes originated the Rhodes algorithm in linear programming. He worked with Arthur Bowley, and also with Sir Alexander Carr-Saunders on his study of juvenile delinquency, and he contributed to population studies and the statistical study of examinations (see his book with Sir Philip John Hartog entitled An Examination of Examinations.

== Papers ==
- Reducing Observations by the Method of Minimum Deviations, Phil. Magazine 7th Series. Pp. 974 – 992, 1930
- Young Offenders, an Enquiry Into Juvenile Delinquency, A.M. Carr-Saunders e Hermann Mannheim, 1942
- An examination of examinations : being a summary of investigations on the comparison of marks allotted to examinations scripts by independent examiners and boards of examiners, together with a section on a viva voce examination, with Sir Philip John Hartog, 1936
