= G. A. den Hartogh =

Dutch moral, legal and political philosopher

Govert A. den Hartogh (born 1943, Kampen) is a Dutch moral, legal and political philosopher. He studied theology in Kampen and philosophy in Leiden and Oxford. He received his PhD in philosophy in 1985 from the University of Amsterdam (supervisor Trudy van Asperen). From 1974 on he worked at the University of Amsterdam as assistant and associate professor of ethics and jurisprudence in the Philosophy Department and the Faculty of Law, as an extra-ordinary professor of medical ethics in the Faculty of Medicine, and as a full professor of ethics and its history in the Philosophy Department. In 1992 he took the initiative of founding the Netherlands School for Research in Practical Philosophy, together with Robert Heeger and Bert Musschenga, and functioned as the school's first director. He retired in 2008. At his retirement his former Ph.D. students published a Festschrift.

In 2002 Den Hartogh published Mutual Expectations: a Conventionalist Theory of Law. The book develops a theory of duties and rights, and of the relation between ethics and law, that situates itself in the modern natural law tradition from Grotius to Hume. Other topics that he published on include: the meaning of consent in Locke’s political philosophy, the relation between intentions and reasons for action, the obligation to obey the law, pluralistic theories of justice, fiscal morality and principles of just taxation, and the proper role in politics of conceptions of the good life with a collective dimension. In recent years his research has concentrated on bioethical issues: wrongful life, organ donation, and in particular decisions about the end of life. He has extensively contributed to the Dutch debate on the legal regulation of such decisions and has been a member of one of the Dutch Regional Review Committees for Euthanasia from 1998 to 2010.

Den Hartogh edited Springer’s Library of Ethics and Applied Philosophy from 1997 to 2008, and is a member of the Health Council of the Netherlands since 2002. In 2009 he was the president of the QANU review committee that assessed most of the degree (MA and BA) programs in philosophy of the Dutch universities.

== Selected bibliography ==
- "Made by Contrivance, and the Consent of Men": Abstract Principle and Historical Fact in Locke's Political Philosophy. Interpretation, 17 (1989–90), 193-221. Reprint in John R. Milton ed., Locke's Moral, Political and Legal Philosophy, International Library of Critical Essays in the History of Philosophy, Ashgate Aldershot 1999.
- ‘The Rationality of Conditional Cooperation.’ Erkenntnis Vol.38 (1993)
- ‘A Conventionalist Theory of Obligation.’ Law and Philosophy, Vol. 17 (1998), 351-376
- The Architectonic of Michael Walzer's Theory of Justice. Political Theory 27 (1999), 491-522.
- Introduction to: G.A. den Hartogh (ed.), The Good Life as a Public Good., Dordrecht, Kluwer 2000, 1-28
- Mutual Expectations: A Conventionalist Theory of Law. Law and Philosophy Library, Vol. 56, Kluwer, The Hague 2002
- ‘The authority of intention.’ Ethics, Vol. 115 (2004), 6-34
- ‘Intending for autonomous reasons.’ In: Bruno Verbeek (ed.), Intentions and Reasons, Ashgate, Aldershot 2008, 181-206
- The Slippery Slope Argument. In: Peter Singer, Helga Kuhse eds., Companion to Bioethics, Wiley-Blackwell 2009, Second Edition, 321-
- Can Consent be Presumed? Journal of Applied Philosophy 28 (2011), 295-307.
- The Regulation of Euthanasia: How successful is the Dutch System?
- In: Stuart J. Youngner, Gerrit K. Kimsma eds. Physician-Assisted Death in Perspective: Assessing the Dutch Experience. Cambridge University Press, 2012, 351-391.
- The Political Obligation to Donate Organs. Ratio Juris. 26 (2013), 378-403
- Is Human Dignity the Ground of Human Rights? In: Marcus Düwell, Jens Braarvig, Roger Brownsword, Dietmar Mieth eds. The Cambridge Handbook of Human Dignity: Interdisciplinary Perspectives. Cambridge: Cambridge University Press 2014, 200-207. https://doi.org/10.1017/CBO9780511979033.025
- Do we need a threshold conception of competence? Medicine, Health Care and Philosophy 19 (2016): 71-83.
- Two Kinds of Suicide. Bioethics 30 (2016): 672-680.
- Sedation until Death: are the requirements laid down in the guidelines too restrictive? Kennedy Institute of Ethics Journal 26 (2016): 369-397.
- Suffering and dying well. The aim of palliative care. Medicine, Health Care and Philosophy 20 (2017): 3: 413-424.
- Two kinds of physician-assisted death. Bioethics 2017; 31: 666-673.
- Relieving one’s relatives from the burdens of care. Medicine, Health Care and Philosophy 2017
- The medical exception to the prohibition of killing: a matter of the right intention? Ratio Juris 2019.
