= Mrs. Bowdich =

English writer (1861–1930)

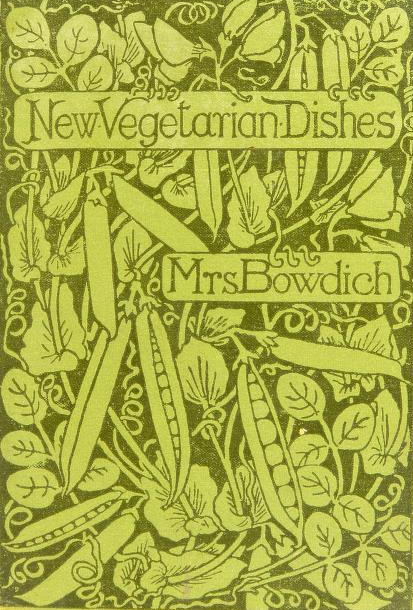
- Revised second edition cover of New Vegetarian Dishes (1893)
- Born: Evelyne Webb George; 22 August 1861; Bushey, England
- Died: 22 October 1930 (aged 69); Golders Green, Hendon, England
- Resting place: Highgate Cemetery
- Occupation: Writer
- Spouse: John Bowdich (m. 1882; died 1914)
- Children: 1
- Writing career
- Language: English
- Period: 1890–1893
- Subjects: Child rearing; vegetarian cookery
- Notable works: Confidential Chats with Mothers (1890); New Vegetarian Dishes (1892)

Signature
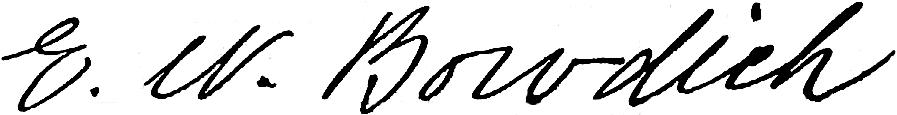

Evelyne Webb Bowdich (Note: Her first name is also recorded as Eveline and Evelyn. Her birth and death records give her first name as Evelyne. While her surname is given as Bowdich on her marriage and death records, it is sometimes recorded as Bowditch.) (née George; 22 August 1861 – 22 October 1930), who wrote under the name Mrs. Bowdich, was an English writer on child rearing and vegetarian cookery. She contributed articles to Baby: The Mother's Magazine, several of which were revised and expanded for her book Confidential Chats with Mothers (1890). She also wrote the cookbook New Vegetarian Dishes (1892), which went through multiple editions. Bowdich filed patents in 1890 and 1914 for devices intended to prevent drips from siphons, and she supported animal welfare causes.

== Biography ==
=== Early life ===
Bowdich was born Evelyne Webb George in Bushey on 22 August 1861. She was the youngest daughter of Richard George, a dance teacher, and Augusta Mary George (née Newman).

=== Writing ===
==== Child-rearing articles ====
Bowdich wrote articles on child rearing for Baby: The Mother's Magazine, edited by Ada Ballin. Her contributions included "The Child with the Perpetual Cold", "Our Seed-Time and Harvest", and pieces in the magazine's "Confidential Chats" series. She later contributed an article on spoiled children to Every Woman's Encyclopaedia.

==== Confidential Chats with Mothers (1890) ====
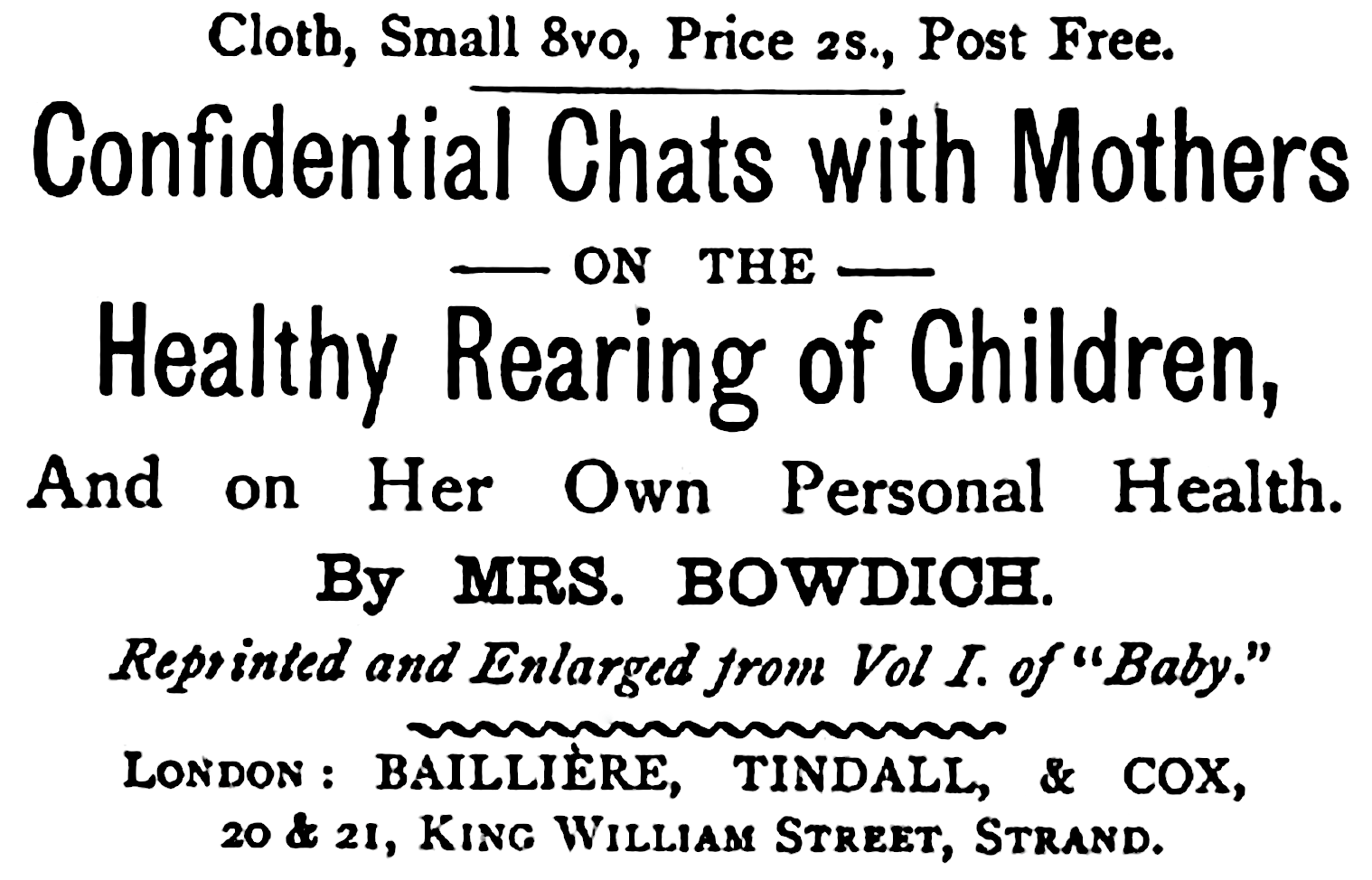
Advertisement for Confidential Chats with Mothers (1890)

In 1890, Bowdich published Confidential Chats with Mothers: On the Healthy Rearing of Children, a book based on revised and expanded articles from Baby: The Mother's Magazine. She wrote that her advice was drawn from experience as a mother:

[T]here are already many highly useful and well-known works treating of maternity and its responsibilities; but they are mostly written by medical men, who, although giving most excellent advice, are obliged in a great measure to speak theoretically. I am therefore emboldened to offer some useful hints from my own experience.

Bowdich argued that some contemporary child-care advice made mothers less willing to trust their own judgment. She objected to the use of paid or informal carers for very young infants, describing the practice as unnatural, and maintained that babies needed their mothers' affection and close physical care.

The book received a positive notice in the Evening Sentinel. In The Bookseller, a short notice described Bowdich's remarks as "shrewdly sensible and practical". In 1891, Baby: The Mother's Magazine reported that a copy had been well received by Queen Victoria.

==== New Vegetarian Dishes (1892) ====
Bowdich published New Vegetarian Dishes in 1892. It contained 221 recipes, 200 of which she said were her own and had been tested by her. The book included recipes for soups, salads, savouries, stews, souffles and sauces. The preface was written by Ernest Bell and the cover was designed by Gleeson White.

According to Cedar Philips, New Vegetarian Dishes placed more emphasis on taste and enjoyment than earlier vegetarian cookbooks, which often advocated a more restrictive diet and used fewer seasonings.

Contemporary notices and reviews appeared in publications including The Zoophilist, The Bazaar, Exchange and Mart, and Journal of the Household, and The Saturday Review. A revised second edition was published in 1893, and the book went through at least 12 editions.

=== Patents ===
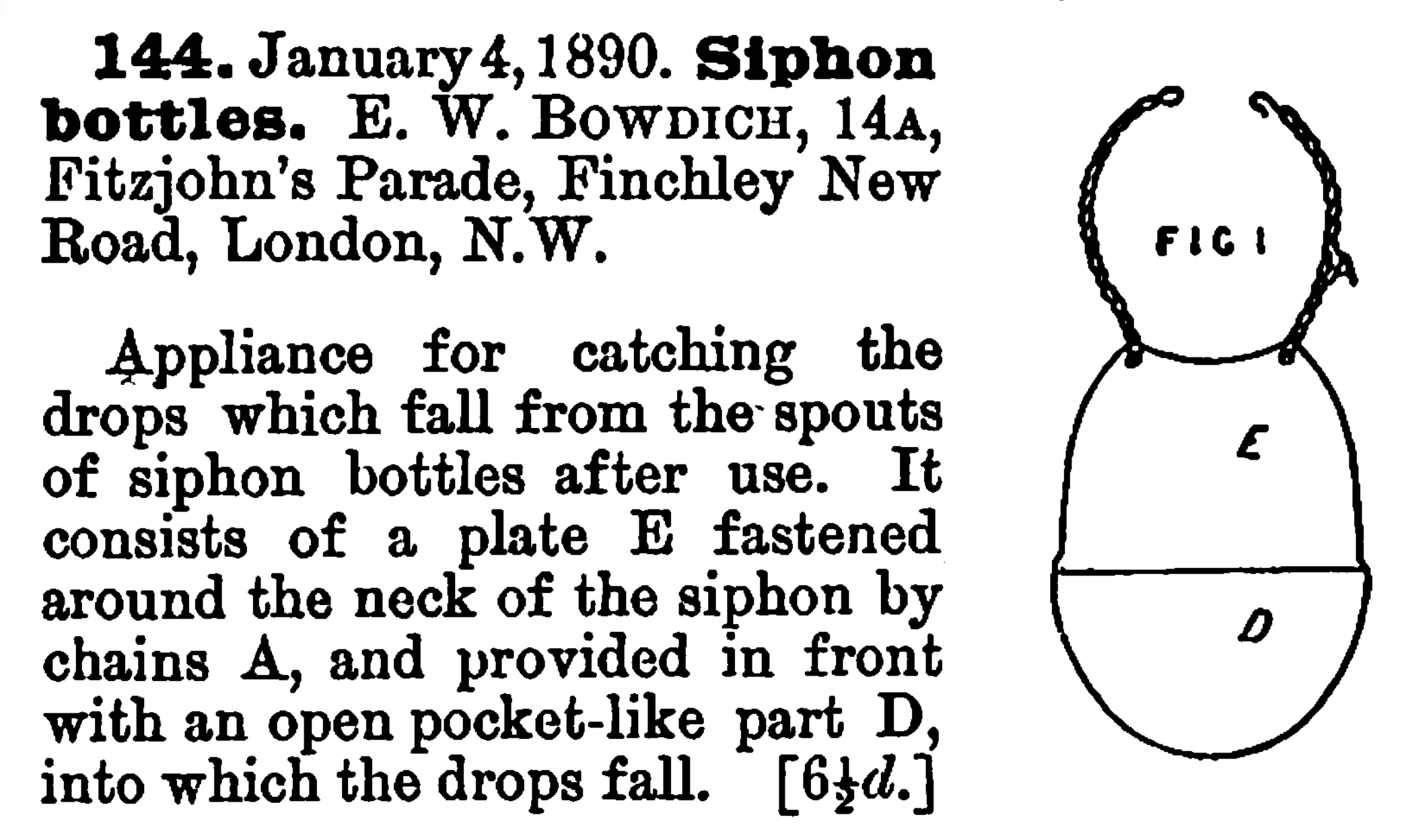
Patent entry for Bowdich's "drop receiver" (1890)

Bowdich filed two patents: one in 1890 for a "drop receiver", designed to catch drops falling from the spouts of mineral water and other syphons after use, and another in 1914 for a "drip arrester".

=== Animal welfare ===
In 1899, Bowdich was a donor to The Animals' Friend Sustentation Fund. The following year, she wrote a letter to the editor of the Hampstead & Highgate Express, appealing for funds for the Hampstead Society for the Protection of Animals.

=== Personal life and death ===
Bowdich married the auctioneer John Bowdich on 5 September 1882 at the Church of St Stephen the Martyr, Regent's Park. They had one son, Harcourt John (1886–1912). Her husband died in 1914 and was buried at Highgate Cemetery.

Bowdich died of stomach cancer in Golders Green, Hendon, on 22 October 1930, aged 69. She was buried at Highgate Cemetery the following day.

== Legacy ==
New Vegetarian Dishes is held by the NC State University Libraries as part of the Bernard Unti Book and Ephemera Collection on Animal Studies. Selected recipes by Bowdich were reprinted in Anne O'Connell's Early Vegetarian Recipes (2009) and Mark Thompson's Vintage Vegetarian Cuisine.

In Are Mothers Really Necessary? (1987), Bob Mullan described Bowdich as a precursor to John Bowlby's views on maternal care, citing Confidential Chats with Mothers. He quoted her criticism of placing infants in the care of strangers soon after birth and her argument that young babies needed a mother's "instinctive love" and physical care.

In a 2025 review essay in Science of De Kai's Raising AI, Adrian Woolfson referred to Bowdich while discussing arguments about delegated care and De Kai's view that AI systems should be "raised" through design, training, and engagement.

== Publications ==
=== Articles ===
- Ballin, Ada S., ed. (1890). "The Child with the Perpetual Cold". Baby: The Mother's Magazine. 4 (37): 5–7.
- Ballin, Ada S., ed. (February 1891). "Our Seed-Time and Harvest". Baby: The Mother's Magazine. 4 (39): 78–79.
- "The Spoilt Child". Every Woman's Encyclopaedia. Vol. 2. London. 1910–1912. pp. 963–964.

=== Books ===
- Confidential Chats with Mothers: On the Healthy Rearing of Children. London: Bailliere, Tindall and Cox. 1890.
- New Vegetarian Dishes. London: George Bell & Sons. 1892. hdl:2027/hvd.rsmcw3.
