= Hertog =

Dutch ice cream brand

- Product type: Ice cream
- Current owner: Unilever
- Country: The Netherlands
- Introduced: 1976; 50 years ago
- Markets: The Netherlands
- Website: hertogijs.nl

Hertog is a Dutch ice cream brand, owned by the Anglo-Dutch Unilever conglomerate. It was first introduced by Willem den Hertog in the summer of 1976 in the Netherlands. In 1996, Unilever bought the brand, and continued selling it.
