= Celia Moss Levetus =

- Born: Celia Moss; 1819; Portsea Island, England
- Died: 1873 (aged 53–54); Birmingham, England
- Spouse: Lewis Levetus
- Writing career
- Language: English
- Genres: Poetry, fiction

Celia Moss Levetus (1819–1873) was an English writer. Her best known work is The Romance of Jewish History, which she published in serial form with her sister Marion Moss in 1840.

== Biography ==
Celia Moss was born in Portsea to Joseph and Amelia Moss in 1819. She was one of twelve siblings. When Celia and her sister Marion (born 1821) were children, their father would often read romantic poetry to them while they sewed. In 1838, the teenaged sisters published a volume of poems dedicated to Sir George Staunton. The style and form of the poems range from short lyrics to lengthier historical and dramatic pieces, and demonstrate an extensive knowledge of history and literature. Some of the poems, such as "The Massacre of the Jews at York," have explicitly Jewish themes, while others, such as "The Battle of Bannockburn," do not. The girls were influenced by the romantic poets, traditional Jewish texts, and Victorian women writers such as Felicia Hemans and "L.E.L." (Letitia Elizabeth Landon).

In 1840, while working as teachers in London, the sisters jointly published The Romance of Jewish History. The book was dedicated to Sir Edward Bulwer-Lytton, and published by subscription; Bulwer-Lytton and Lord Palmerston were among the subscribers. Three years later they published Tales of Jewish History. They also published poems and short stories, and a short-lived periodical, The Sabbath Journal.

Celia Moss married Lewis Levetus of Birmingham and stopped writing for a time. Towards the end of her life she published one last book, The King's Physician, and Other Tales. She died after a long illness in Birmingham in 1873.

== Works ==
- Moss, Celia; Moss, Marion (1838). Early Efforts: A Volume of Poems, by the Misses Moss, of the Hebrew Nation, Aged 18 and 16. Portsmouth: Whittaker & Co.
- Moss, Celia; Moss, Marion (1840). The Romance of Jewish History. London: Saunders and Otley.
- Moss, Celia; Moss, Marion (1843). Tales of Jewish History. London: Miller and Field.
- Levetus, Celia Moss (1865). The King's Physician, and Other Tales. Portsea: T. Hinton.
