= Stuart J. Youngner =

American bioethicist and psychiatrist

Stuart J. Youngner is Professor of Bioethics and Psychiatry at Case Western Reserve University School of Medicine.

He received his BA from Swarthmore. and his MD from Case, where he also did an internship in pediatrics and a residency in psychiatry. Youngner subsequently studied bioethics at the Kennedy Institute of Ethics at Georgetown University. He is certified by the American Board of Psychiatry and Neurology. He is a nationally and internationally recognized scholar in the areas of definitions of death, ethics of organ transplantation and procurement, clinical ethics consultation, and end-of-life decision making.

He has served as a consultant to the Pontifical Academy of Sciences, the Office of Technology Assessment of the U.S. Congress, the Robert Wood Johnson Foundation, and the U. S. Institute of Medicine of the National Academy of Sciences. He was co-director of the national task force on Standards in ethics evaluation. He is on the editorial boards of the Journal of Medicine and Philosophy, the Kennedy Institute of Ethics Journal, and the Journal of Law, Medicine and Ethics.

He is the editor or coeditor of eleven books; his latest book is The Oxford Handbook on Death and Dying. New York: Oxford University 2016. He has written over 100 peer reviewed journal articles.

== Honors ==
- Fellow of the Hastings Center
- Fellow of the American Psychiatric Association
- President of the Society for Bioethics Consultation, 1994–1997
- Founding member of the American Society for Bioethics and Humanities
- Distinguished Service Award, American Society for Bioethics and Humanities. 2000
- President, Society for Health and Human Values 1994-9
- President, The Association for Bioethics Program Directors 2014-2016

== Publications ==
=== Books ===
- Transplanting Human Tissue: Ethics, Policy and Practice, Oxford University Press, 2003. ISBN 978-0-19-516284-4
  - Review, by Mark A. Rothstein 2006. The American Journal of Bioethics 6(3):76 review
- The Definition of Death: Contemporary Controversies (Johns Hopkins University Press).
- Ethics Consultation: From Theory to Practice with Mark P. Aulisio, Robert M. Arnold 2003
- The Definition of Death: Contemporary Controversies ed., with Robert M. Arnold, and Renie Schapiro, Johns Hopkins University Press, 1999. ISBN 978-0-8018-5985-4
- End-Of-Life Decisions: A Psychological Perspective ed. with Maurice Steinberg and), Stuart J. Younger. American Psychiatric Pub Group, `1998. ISBN 978-0-88048-756-6
  - Review, by Terry Rabinowitz, Psychosomatics 40:3, May–June 1999 full text
- Organ Transplantation: Meanings and Realities ed., with Renée C. Fox, and Laurence J. O'Connell University of Wisconsin Press, 1996. ISBN 0-299-14964-1
