= Marion Hartog =

English poet, author, and educator

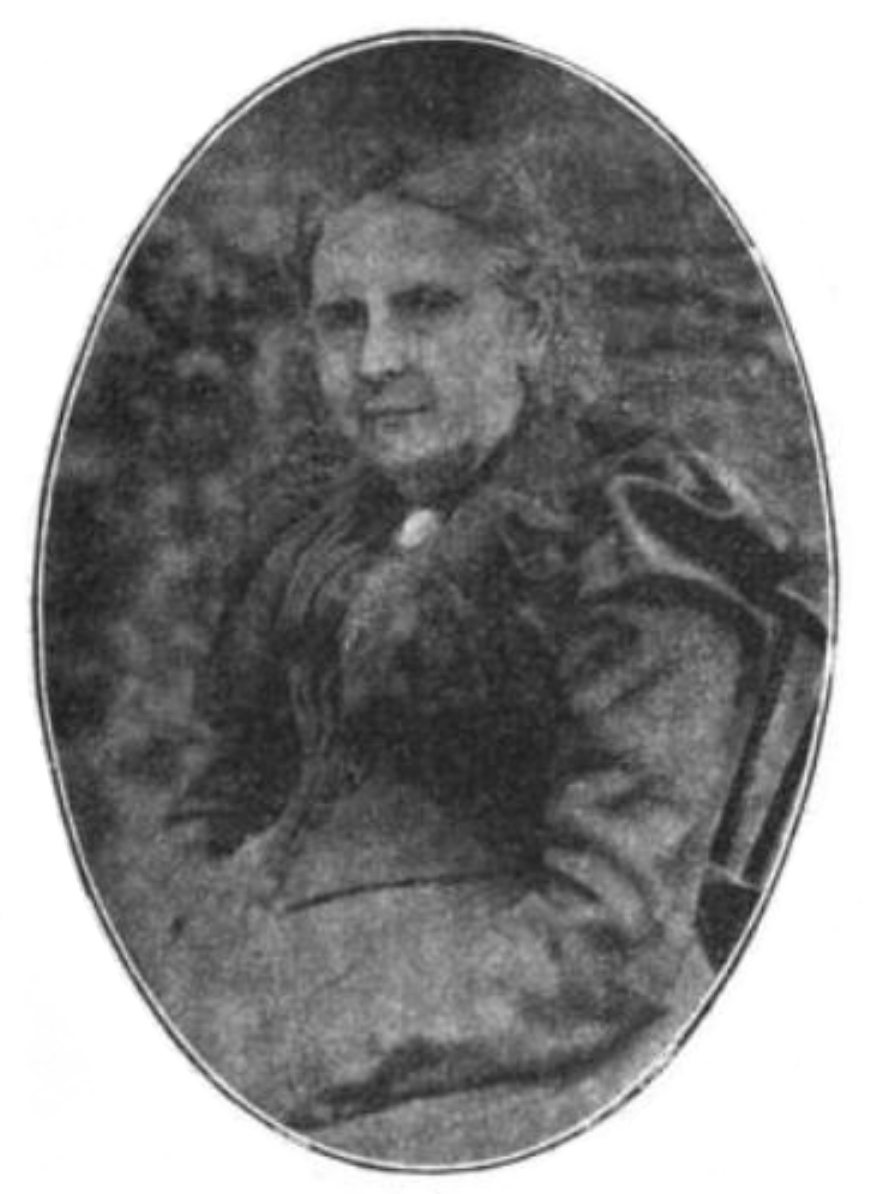
- Born: Marion Moss; 22 October 1821; Portsmouth, England
- Died: 29 October 1907 (aged 86); Kilburn, London, England
- Spouse: Alphonse Hartog (m. 1845; died 1904)
- Children: Héléna Darmesteter; Marcus Hartog; Numa Hartog; Philip Hartog
- Relatives: Celia Levetus (sister); Hertha Ayrton (niece); Ada Ballin (niece)
- Writing career
- Genres: Poetry, fiction
- Movement: Romanticism

Signature
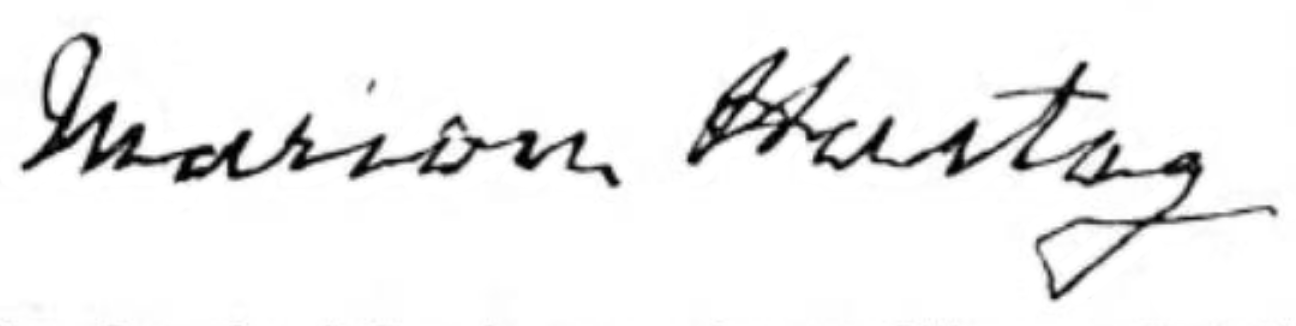

Marion Moss Hartog (22 October 1821 – 29 October 1907) was an English Jewish poet, author, and educator. She was the editor of the first Jewish women's periodical, The Jewish Sabbath Journal.

== Biography ==
=== Early life ===
Marion Moss was born at Portsmouth on 22 October 1821, one of twelve children of Amelia (née Solomons) and Joseph Moss. Her great-grandfather was one of the founders of the Portsmouth Jewish community, and her grandmother, Sarah Davids, was the first Jewish child born in Portsmouth. Moss was educated by her parents, and at an early age began with her sister Celia the composition of poems and stories.

In 1838 the sisters published by subscription a book of poems entitled Early Efforts, influenced in part by classical Jewish texts and the works of Late-Romantic female poets like Felicia Hemans and L.E.L. Among other poems, the volume includes various laments for Jerusalem and a narrative documentary of the York Massacre of 1190, as well as thematically-non-Jewish poems such as The Battle of Bannockburn and Amy Robsart's Complaint to the Earl of Leicester. The book was successful enough for a second edition to be called for the following year.

=== Career ===
In 1840 she and Celia published three volumes of tales entitled The Romance of Jewish History, along the lines of Leitch Ritchie's Romance of French History. Each chapter consisted of a "Historical Summary" of some particular period of Jewish history, followed by a story which the authors had woven around the principal events. Among the subscribers to the work were Sir Edward Bulwer-Lytton (to whom it was dedicated), Lord Palmerston, and Sir Moses Montefiore. These volumes were followed by Tales of Jewish History (1843).

By this time, Moss was engaged in literary work for different publications. She contributed "The Gift and the Loan," and other tales, to the Bradford Observer, which were afterwards reproduced by Isaac Leeser in the Occident. She also contributed to the Metropolitan Magazine, and subsequently the Jewish Chronicle and Jewish World.

A little later Moss went to London and gained a livelihood as a teacher. In August 1845, she married Paris-born Alphonse Hartog, with whom she had been taking French lessons, and shortly after her marriage established a boarding and day school for young children, which she continued to conduct until her retirement in 1884. Hartog's pupils included her niece Sarah Marks, later better known as Hertha Ayrton who moved in with the Hartog family upon the death of her father in 1861.

=== The Jewish Sabbath Journal ===
In early 1855, Hartog founded the first Jewish women's periodical, The Jewish Sabbath Journal; A Penny and Moral Magazine for the Young, consisting of stories, verses, and religious addresses. The disapproval of Abraham Benisch, however, precluded her from publishing notices in The Jewish Chronicle, and subscriptions soon fell off. The journal's fourteenth and final issue was published on 8 June 1855, and ended with the poem "On the Death of My Beloved Child".

=== Later life and death ===
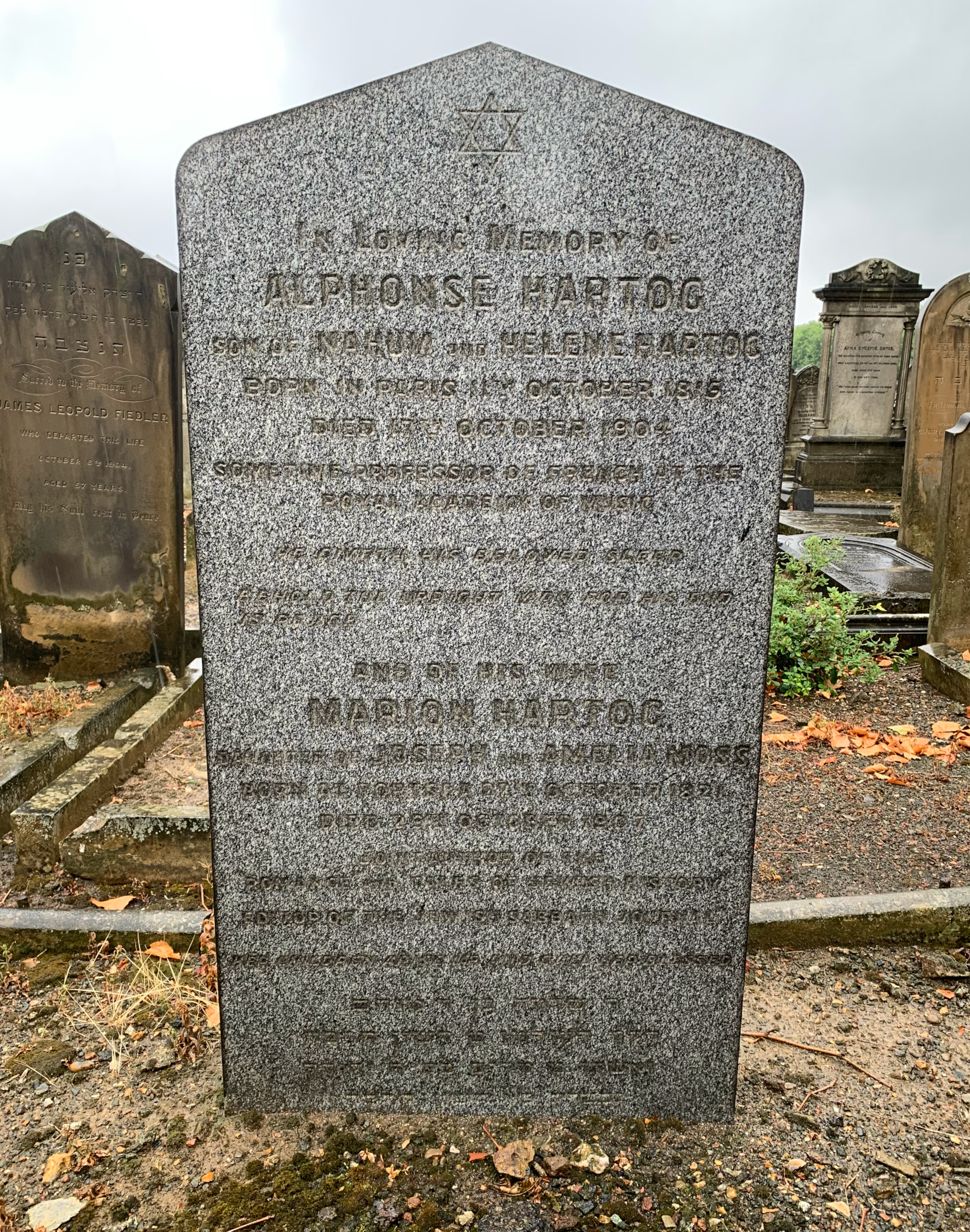
Grave of Marion and Alphonse Hartog at Willesden Jewish Cemetery

Hartog wrote little for the remaining 52 years of her life. She died on 29 October 1907 at her home in Kilburn, London, at the age of eighty-six. Many of her children were eminent. Of her sons, Numa Edward Hartog was Senior Wrangler at Cambridge; Marcus and Sir Philip Hartog were distinguished men of science. Her daughters were Héléna Arsène Darmesteter, the portrait-painter, and Cécile Hartog, the composer and pianist.

== Partial bibliography ==
- Moss, Celia and Marion (1839). Early Efforts; A Volume of Poems, by the Misses Moss, of the Hebrew Nation, Aged 18 and 16 (2nd ed.). Portsmouth: Whittaker & Co.
- Moss, Celia and Marion (1840). The Romance of Jewish History. Vol. 1–3. London: Saunders & Otley.
- Moss, Celia and Marion (1843). Tales of Jewish History. Vol. 1–3. London: Miller & Field.
