= Cécile Hartog =

English pianist and composer

Cécile Sarah Hartog
- Born: 1857; London, England
- Died: 1940 (aged 82–83)
- Education: Royal Academy of Music
- Occupations: Composer, pianist, music educator
- Known for: Composition and piano performance; song The Years at the Spring performed at The Proms
- Notable work: The Years at the Spring, Barbara's Song Book, Barcarolle in G minor
- Relatives: Hertha Ayrton (cousin), Héléna Arsène Darmesteter (sister), Marcus Hartog (brother), Philip Hartog (brother), Numa Edward Hartog (brother)

Cécile Sarah Hartog (1857–1940) was an English composer and pianist.

== Early life and education ==
Cécile Sarah Hartog was born in London in 1857, the daughter of school teacher, author and editor Marion Moss Hartog, and her husband Alphonse Hartog, a professor of French. Her siblings were the artist Héléna Arsène Darmesteter, natural historian Marcus Hartog, mathematician Numa Edward Hartog, and the chemist Philip Hartog. The mathematician and engineer Hertha Ayrton was her cousin.

She studied music with Charles Salaman, and later at the Royal Academy of Music, where she took the gold medal for composition in 1889 and had a piano quartet performed, as well as an orchestral Andante and Gavotte. Her teachers there and elsewhere included Frederick Cowen, Woldemar Bargiel, Oscar Beringer, and (in Berlin) Karl Klindworth.

== Career ==
She was active as a soloist and sometimes conductor from the 1880s until the First World War. She also taught harmony at the Maida Vale High School for Girls in London.

While conducting the orchestra for the play Beethoven's Romance at the Royalty Theatre on 1 December 1894, the sleeve of her muslin dress was set alight by one of the lamps on her music desk. A member of the orchestra managed to extinguish it quickly with an opera cloak, which may have saved her life. Press reports said she was nevertheless severely injured.

As a composer she wrote solo piano music, notably the Barcarolle in G minor, the two Chateaux en Espagne for clarinet and piano, and many songs, including settings of The Years at the Spring (Browning, performed at The Proms in 1909), Northern Song (Lang), Sunset (Zangwill), Snow May Drift (Heine), and Song of the Jewish Soldier (Alice Lucas). A song book for children, Barbara's Song Book, with illustrations by John Hassall, was published in 1900. She also composed incidental music for plays, such as the music for The Fairies' Jest, and Other Plays for Boys by Amy H Langdon, (1906).

Hartog was the author of the article 'Poets of Provence' in the Contemporary Review, October, 1894.

In later life she lived at 12, Horbury Crescent, London W11.
