= Koos Hertogs =

Dutch serial killer

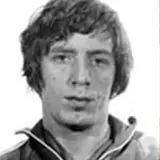
- Koos Hertogs
- Born: Jacobus Dirk Hertogs; 16 December 1949; The Hague, Netherlands
- Died: 19 July 2015 (aged 65) 's-Hertogenbosch, Netherlands
- Penalty: Life imprisonment

Details
- Victims: 3
- Span of crimes: 1979–1980
- Country: Netherlands
- Date apprehended: 3 October 1980

Jacobus Dirk (Koos) Hertogs (The Hague, 16 December 1949 – 's-Hertogenbosch, 19 July 2015) was a convicted Dutch serial killer. He was convicted of a total of three murders.

== Victims ==
- Tialda Visser, 12 years old, was reported missing on 11 May 1979, after she didn't return home after ballet classes at the Royal Conservatory of The Hague. Four days later, on 15 May, her lifeless body was found near the Leeghwaterbrug in The Hague. The cause of death could not be determined.
- Emy den Boer, 18 years old, disappeared on 3 April 1980. She left her home in Schiedam to go to the Academie voor Lichamelijke Opvoeding in The Hague, however she never got there. Two days later, on 5 April, her body was found by a hiker in the forest near Nistelrode. She was shot in the stomach and head.
- Edith Post, 11 years old, disappeared while at school on 29 September 1980. She left her class to get some materials from a closet in the hallway but didn't return. On 2 October her body was found in the dunes of Wassenaar. She was beaten to death, probably with a branch that was found next to her body.

== Private life ==
Hertogs was in a homosexual relationship with Cornelis Stolk, Vice President of the court in The Hague.

== Arrest ==
After the murder on Edith Post, the police received an anonymous call with the information that Edith had bitten her murderer, and a bouncer of nightclub "De Nachtegaal" (The Nightingale) had a severe bite wound on his little finger. The bouncer, who was subsequently arrested, turned out to be Koos Hertogs. Police searched his house and found traces of blood matched to Tialda Visser and Emy den Boer. In the attic, police found an insulated room. It is believed that Hertogs hid and raped his victims here for a period of time, before killing them. Hertogs was sentenced to life imprisonment. Until 1989 Hertogs denied killing the girls. However, after consultation with his lawyer, he confessed so he could be placed on a lighter regime.

== Sting operation ==
For a long time, there were rumours that Hertogs had protection from high-level individuals. In the book Zuidwal, which tells the story of the serial killer, it is claimed that Hertogs was protected by Cornelis Stolk, an important judge and vice president of the court, however, both men denied the claims. In 2009 crime reporter Peter R. de Vries started a sting operation, trying to reveal if Hertogs murdered more people or if the claims made in the book were true. While being filmed with hidden cameras, Hertogs, talking with a 'dear' friend, who turned out to be an infiltrator working for De Vries, made some notable admissions.

- He admitted he kidnapped and murdered the three girls.
- With the murder of Edith Post he had an accomplice.
- Three times he had plans to murder someone, however, the plans weren't carried out or failed.
  - Claimed a man he planned to kill who he had an argument with fled inside a pool hall before Hertogs could kill him.
  - Claimed he planned to kill a director of a juvenile prison, however, the man died before Hertogs could carry out his plan.
  - Hertogs lured an inmate into a trap, however, a guard got suspicious and locked him up.
- Confessed knowing who murdered the two Swedish women Gun-Ingeborg Johannesson (18) and Ann Jönsson (19) in a forest near La Roche-en-Ardenne.
- Confessed he had a special bond with judge Cornelis Stolk. Stolk paid for the driver's license of Hertogs and after an earlier conviction, Stolk placed him under the care of a 'befriended' psychiatrist, who later turned out to be the ex-wife of Stolk. At the end of the television show, it was revealed that Hertogs, in return, offered sexual services (oral sex) and child pornography to Cornelis Stolk. Mr. Cornelis Stolk died on 10 June 2004, aged 87.

== See also ==
- List of serial killers by country
- List of serial killers by number of victims
