= Treatise on Radioactivity =

1910 publication by Marie Curie

Treatise on Radioactivity (French: Traité de Radioactivité) is a two-volume 1910 book written by the Polish scientist Marie Curie as a survey on the subject of radioactivity. She was awarded her second Nobel Prize in the following year after the publication of the book. The book, which was dedicated to her newly deceased collaborator and husband Pierre Curie, has been described as "a classic synthesis of current research on radioactivity by scientists of the early 20th century." It was published by the Paris publisher Gauthier-Villars.
