= Nils den Hartog =

Dutch footballer (born 1994)

Personal information
- Full name: Nils den Hartog
- Date of birth: 25 March 1994 (age 32)
- Place of birth: Schoonrewoerd, Netherlands
- Height: 1.90 m (6 ft 3 in)
- Position: Goalkeeper

Youth career
- HSSC '61
- 2004–2013: RKC

Senior career*
Years	Team	Apps	(Gls)
2013–2017	RKC	11	(0)
2016–2017	→ Kozakken Boys (loan)	23	(0)
2017–2021	Kozakken Boys	34	(0)
2022-2023	WNC		

International career
2012	Netherlands U18	1	(0)
- * Club domestic league appearances and goals as of 28 March 2022

Nils den Hartog (born 25 March 1994) is a Dutch retired footballer who played as a goalkeeper.

== Career ==
Den Hartog was raised in Hei- en Boeicop and played in the youth academy of RKC after having been scouted at his hometown club club HSSC '61. He had initially been on a trial with PSV, but not managed to make the team. After being promoted to the first team of RKC, he was unable to play for a long time due to a fracture of his calf and shin. Den Hartog finally made his debut for the Waalwijk-based club on 19 December 2014, when they lost 5–3 to Emmen. As a replacement for Arjan van Dijk, he defended the goal throughout the game. That season he would make six appearances for the main squad and in the summer of 2015 he was assigned jersey number 1. In the summer of 2016, Den Hartog was sent on loan by RKC to Kozakken Boys for one season. After this loan period, Kozakken Boys decided to sign the goalkeeper on a permanent contract. In December 2020, it was announced that he would leave at the end of the season. After a year out, he resurfaced at WNC in Waardenburg in the Vierde Divisie.

== International career ==
Den Hartog played for the Netherlands national under-18 football team and was once called up for the U19s.
