= Héléna Arsène Darmesteter =

British painter

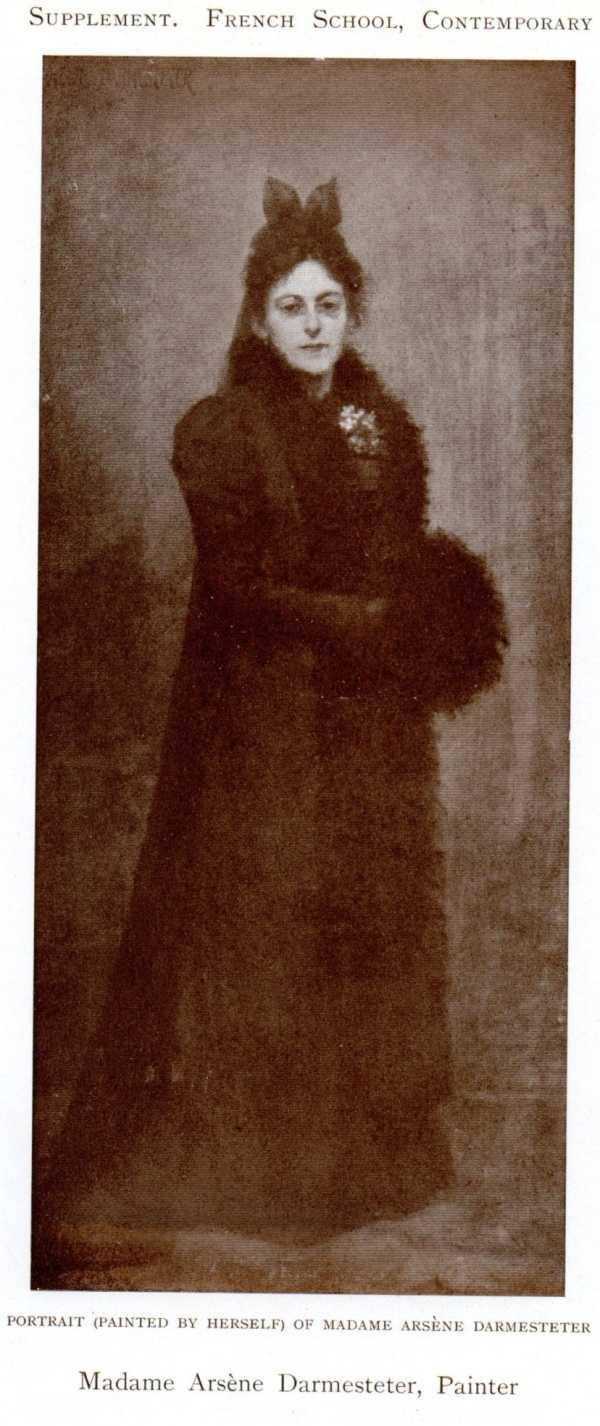
- Self-portrait
- Born: 1850; London, England
- Died: 15 March 1940; Bath, England

Héléna Arsène Darmesteter, born Héléna Hartog (1850 – 15 March 1940) was a British portrait painter.

== Biography ==
Darmesteter was born in London as the daughter of a French school teacher and the editor of the first Jewish women's periodical, Marion Hartog Moss. Her sister was Cécile Hartog, the English composer and pianist. Her brothers were Marcus Hartog, Numa Edward Hartog and Philip Hartog, and her husband's brother James Darmesteter married the poet A. Mary F. Robinson.

Her parents ran a French boarding school where Héléna learned to speak French. She later studied painting in Paris under Gustave Courtois, where she met her husband Arsène Darmesteter. She became a successful portrait painter, exhibiting at the Royal Academy in 1891 and 1894 and at the Exposition Universelle in Paris in 1900. She also showed works at the Royal Academy Summer Exhibitions in 1907 and 1908. She was a member of the Société des Artistes Français and of the Société Nationale des Beaux-Arts.

Her self-portrait and a study of a woman before a mirror were included in the 1905 book Women Painters of the World.

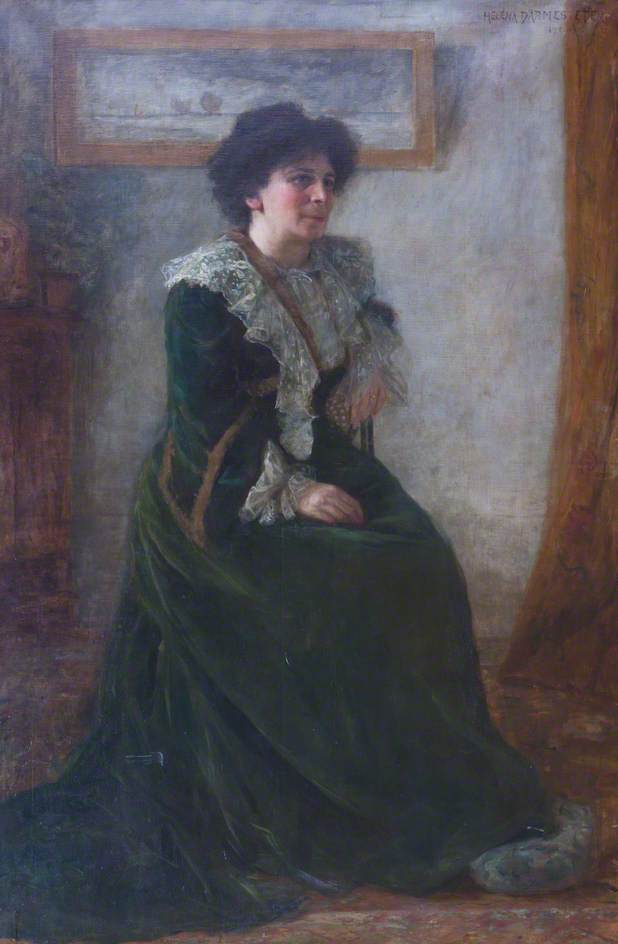
Portrait of cousin Sarah Marks (later called Hertha Ayrton)

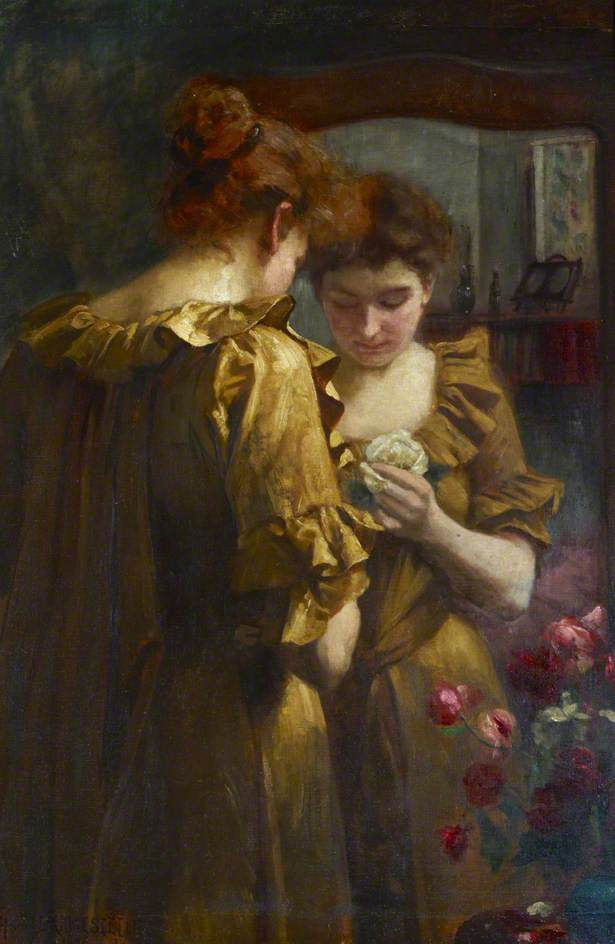
Study of a woman before a mirror
