= The Electrician =

- Discipline: Engineering
- Language: English

Publication details
- History: 1861–1952
- Frequency: Weekly

Standard abbreviations
- ISO 4: Electrician

The Electrician, published in London from 1861–1863 and 1878–1952, was one of the earliest and foremost electrical engineering periodicals and scientific journals. It was published in two series: The original Electrician was published for three years from 1861–1863. After a fifteen year gap, a new series of the Electrician was in print for 72 years from 1878–1952. The Electrician is currently remembered as the publisher of Oliver Heaviside's works, in particular the first publication of the telegrapher's equations, still in wide use for radio engineering.

After the periodical ceased publication in 1952, The Electrician's corporation continued on its book publishing business, printing works on physics and electrical engineering, until 1959.

== Publication history ==
The Electrician was originally established in 1861, it was discontinued after about three years. In 1878 a new journal with the same title was launched and thereafter published weekly.

The Electrician billed itself in the early 1860s as "a weekly journal of Telegraphy, Electricity, and Applied Chemistry" and was published by Thomas Piper.

The new Electrician that appeared in the late 1870s was published by James Gray on behalf of the proprietors, John Pender and James Anderson of the Eastern Telegraph Company, the biggest cable firm of the day and had a somewhat different focus. It described itself as "a weekly illustrated journal of electrical engineering, industry and science" and also featured more theoretical aspects of electrical engineering such as electromagnetism.

In the late nineteenth century, The Electrician Printing and Publication Company Limited was established and began publishing shorter electrical engineering texts including well-known early electrical engineering titles such as Oliver Heaviside's Electromagnetic Theory (1893-1912), Oliver Lodge's The Work of Hertz and Some of His Successors (1894), and many others. Some of these publications were based on papers presented elsewhere and published in full in The Electrician.

The new series of The Electrician quickly established itself in the field of electrical engineering and was regularly quoted and cited in Nature, Scientific American, and elsewhere.

== Other Electrician magazines ==
Between 1889 and 1895 an American journal also called The Electrician was published in New York by Williams & Co. Often referred to as the American Electrician, it was merged into another electrical engineering periodical, Electrical World.
