= Marcus Hartog =

English educator and natural historian

Marcus Manuel Hartog (19 August 1851, London – 21 January 1924, Paris) was an English educator, natural historian, philosopher of biology and zoologist in Cork, Ireland. He contributed to multiple volumes of the Cambridge Natural History.

== Life ==
Hartog was born in London 1851, the second son of the Professor Alphonse Hartog (died 1904) and Marion (née Moss, 1821–1907), younger brother of Numa Edward Hartog and elder brother of Sir Philip Joseph Hartog, Academic Registrar of London University and Vice-Chancellor of the University of Dacca. His two younger sisters were the pianist and composer Cécile Hartog and the portrait painter Héléna Arsène Darmesteter,

Marcus Hartog was educated at the North London Collegiate School, University College, London, and Trinity College, Cambridge, where he took a first class in the National Science Tripos in 1874, and went out in the same year to Ceylon as assistant to the Director of the Royal Botanic Gardens — a post that he held for three years. On his return he became a demonstrator, and afterwards a lecturer in natural history at Owens College, Manchester.

Although never elected to membership of the Manchester Literary & Philosophical Society, unlike his brother Philip, he did however present papers there including " A Preliminary Abstract of an Investigation of the Nervous System of Cyclops" in 1878.

In 1882 he began an association of more than 40 years with the educational life of Cork. For 27 years he was Professor of Natural History at Queen's College, Cork (1882–1907), and in 1909 proceeded to the chair of Zoology in what had become University College Cork. When in 1921 he vacated the appointment, he was made Emeritus Professor.

Hartog was a Lamarckian. He argued for the inheritance of acquired characteristics and identified as a vitalist. He supported the non-Darwinian evolutionary ideas of Samuel Butler and wrote a supportive introduction to his book Unconscious Memory. He argued that cell division occurs due to a new force he termed "mitokinetism".

Hartog died in Paris on 21 January 1924.

== Selected publications ==
Hartog contributed articles to the Dictionary of National Biography and the Encyclopædia Britannica, as well as writing many articles for scientific journals.

- Problems of Life and Reproduction (1913)
- The True Mechanism of Mitosis (1914)

== Family ==
In 1874 in Paris, France, Hartog married Blanche Levy, daughter of R. Levy, of Paris, and had issue.
