= Philip Hartog =

British chemist and educationalist

Sir Philip Joseph Hartog KBE CIE
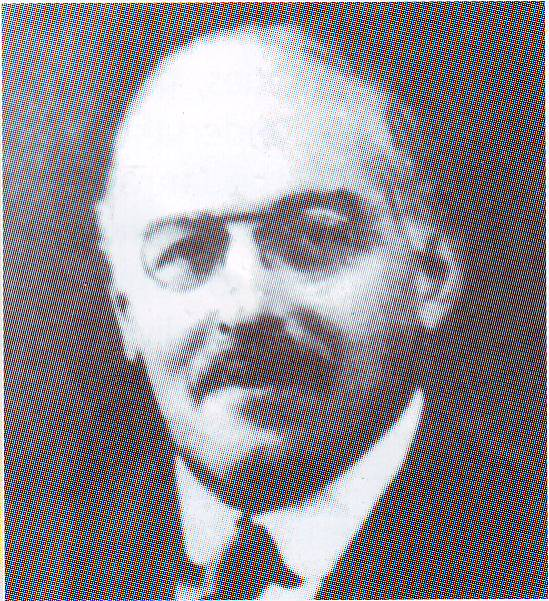
- Born: 2 March 1864; London, England
- Died: 27 June 1947 (aged 83); London, England
- Education: University of Paris; University of Heidelberg
- Occupations: chemist, educationist
- Spouse: Mabel Hélène (m. 1915)
- Father: Alfonse Hartog
- Relatives: Héléna Arsène Darmesteter (sister); Numa Edward Hartog (brother); Marcus Hartog (brother)

Sir Philip Joseph Hartog KBE CIE (2 March 1864 – 27 June 1947) was a British chemist and educationalist who undertook this role in England and India.

== Early life and education ==
Hartog was born in London on 2 March 1864, the third son of Alfonse and Marion Hartog, and the younger brother of Cécile, Héléna, Numa and Marcus Hartog. He was educated at University College School, the Universities of Paris and Heidelberg, and the Collège de France. In 1889, he went to Owens College, Manchester, as Bishop Berkeley Scholar. He was elected to the membership of Manchester Literary and Philosophical Society on 12 November 1895. He edited a history and description of the college (1900), and both there and at the Victoria University he was an assistant lecturer in chemistry. It seemed at that time that this branch of science would claim him.

== Career ==
At Manchester, however, he was being drawn to university administration. He was secretary to the Victoria University Extension Scheme, a member of the Court, and in 1902–03 secretary to the Alfred Moseley Commission of Educational Inquiry. In the latter year, he was appointed Academic Registrar to the University of London, and held that office with great efficiency for 17 years. In 1907 came his influential "Writing of English", attacking the school "essay." An outstanding service to the university, the Empire, and the Eastern world, in general, was his large share in the creation in the middle of the 1914–18 war of the School of Oriental Studies, to which the name "African" was added later. His keen and helpful interest was maintained until his last working days.

Hartog was a member of the commission under Sir Michael Sadler on Calcutta University which was appointed in 1917 and issued a voluminous report in 1919. Far-reaching reforms in most of the Indian universities followed, and Calcutta was shorn of a part of its vast jurisdiction by the creation in 1920 of the University of Dhaka as a residential teaching foundation and Hartog was made its first vice-chancellor. Both at Dhaka and later in their Kensington home he had the cooperation of his wife Mabel Hélène, daughter of Mr. H. J. Kisch (they were married in 1915, and three sons ensued).

On the creation of the Indian Public Service Commission in 1926 Hartog was appointed a member and served until permitted to retire on family grounds in 1930. When the Indian Statutory Commission was set up in 1928 under Sir John (later Lord) Simon, Hartog was appointed chairman of the Auxiliary Committee on Education. The report greatly assisted the presentation of facts and conclusions of the main body and is the most authoritative survey of the subject of our time. Hartog received the honours of the Knight Commander of the Order of the British Empire and Companion of the Order of the Indian Empire in the year of his retirement in reward for his services.

== Activism ==
On settling in London, Hartog devoted much time and thought to the place of examinations in the education system. As early as 1911, and again in 1918, he had written treatises on examinations in their bearing on national efficiency and on culture and general efficiency. He was the dominant figure in an inquiry on an international scale undertaken in 1932. This resulted in the issue in 1935 of An Examination of Examinations. In this exposure of haphazard methods and plans for reform, he had the collaboration of Dr. E. C. Rhodes and also, in a subsequent book, The Marks of Examiners, of Dr. Rhodes and of Mr. Cyril Burt. Deeply impressed by his experience of the need for systematic education research, he obtained from the Leverhulme Trust in 1940 a grant of £2,000 to the University of London Institute of Education for this purpose. The organisation thereby set up was renamed in 1945 the National Foundation for Educational Research in England and Wales, and in 1947 it applied for a royal charter. Hartog was also the prime mover in the setting up by the Ministry of Labour and National Service before the outbreak of war in 1939 of a Linguistic Committee of the Appointments Registry, and he was its first chairman. In 1933 Hartog wrote, under the authority of the London Institute of Education his valuable study, "Some Aspects of Indian Education, Past, and Present." He continued his activities well into his ninth decade, and one of the last of his books, "Words in Action," was published in 1945.

Amid all these labours Hartog was through life a keen helper of his own community. At the end of 1933, he went to Palestine as chairman of the Committee of Inquiry on the organisation of the Hebrew University, and subsequently, he was president of the Friends in Britain of the university. He did much other work for the Jewish People.

In his obituary it states, "Few educationists still working as did in octogenarian years could look back on so varied, strenuous, and fruitful a career as his. He left an enduring mark on educational thought and practice, not only in India but in this county and the Dominions." Sir Philip Hartog, died at a nursing home in London at the age of 83.
