= Numa Edward Hartog =

Jewish British mathematician

Numa Edward Hartog (20 May 1846 – 19 June 1871) was a Jewish British mathematician who attracted attention in 1869 for graduating from Cambridge University as Senior Wrangler and Smith's Prizeman but as a Jew had not been admitted to a fellowship. Hartog's case led to the passage of the Universities Tests Act 1871, which removed religious barriers to holding fellowships at Oxford and Cambridge.

== Biography ==
Hartog was born in London on 20 May 1846 to Alfonse Hartog and Marion Moss. He was the elder brother of Cécile, Héléna, Marcus, and Philip Hartog, and the cousin of Henri Bergson.

In his earlier academic career, he attended University College School in London, and then University College London. At Cambridge, he attended Trinity College. He was a trailblazing figure in overcoming religious obstacles to academic achievement in the UK. For example, when his B.A. was awarded, the words In nomine Patris et Filii et Spiritus Sancti were omitted. However, he was unable to accept a fellowship due to being unable to subscribe to the required test on account of his religion.

Within weeks, Solicitor-General John Coleridge of the Gladstone government introduced legislation to rectify the situation. The House of Lords twice rejected bills passed by the House of Commons before finally accepting the Universities Tests Act of 1871; Hartog's testimony before the Lords helped secure its passage.

He was a member of the Council of Jews' College and an Honorary Secretary of the Society of Hebrew Literature.

Hartog died of smallpox at the age of only 25.
