= Alexandra Club =

Coordinates: 51°30′44.06″N 0°8′45.67″W

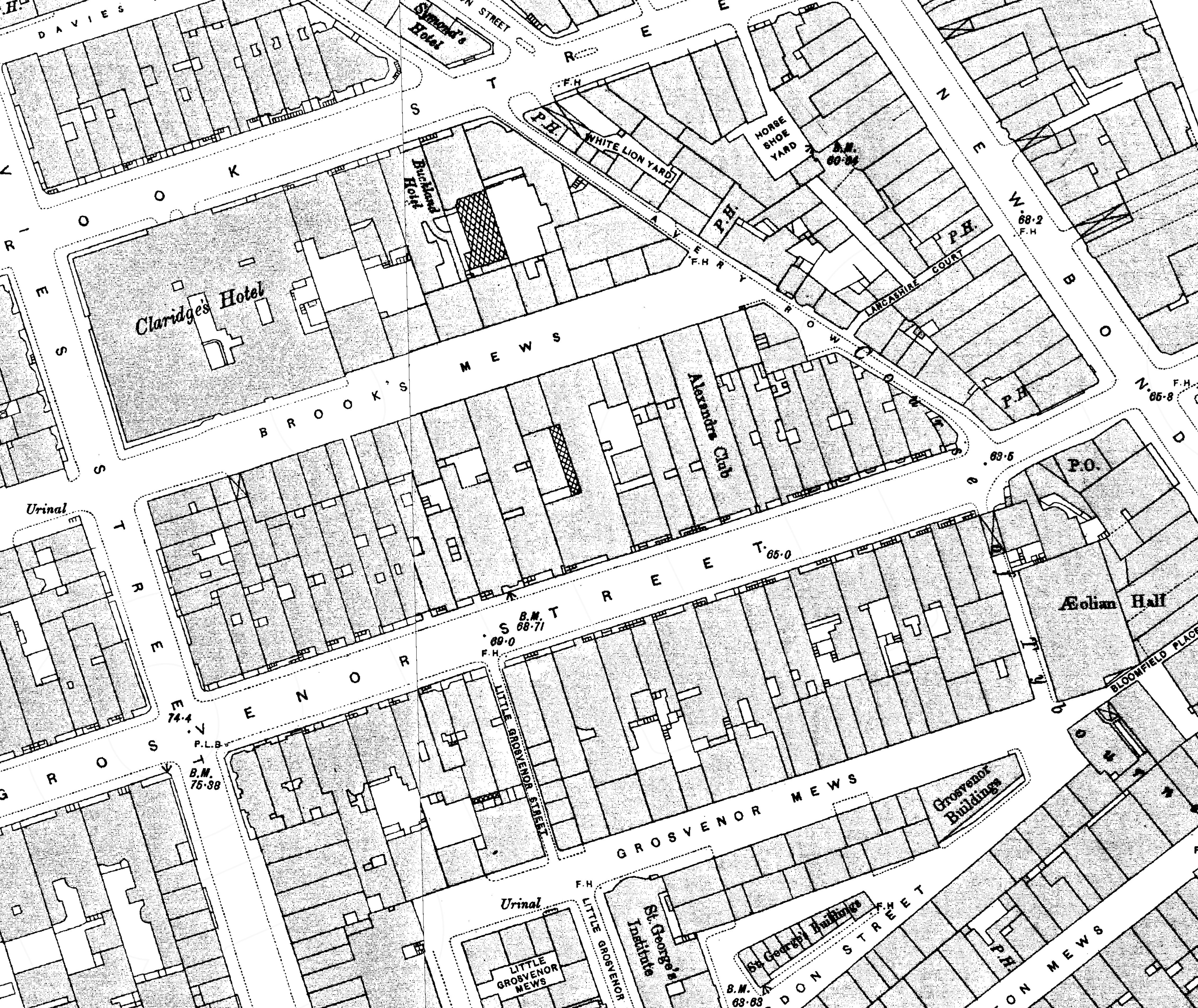
The Alexandra Club (centre) on a 1910 Ordnance Survey map.

The Alexandra Club was a private members club for women in Edwardian London. It was based at 12 Grosvenor Street, at the east end of the street on the north side, in London's Mayfair district. The club was founded in 1884, and closed in 1939. The club had 600 members by 1888.

Membership of the club was only available to women eligible to attend the Queen's Drawing Rooms. Amy Levy in her 1888 novel, The Romance of a Shop considered the merits of the Alexandra Club against other clubs for women and concluded that the phrase "who has been or who would probably be precluded from Her Majesty's Drawing Rooms" to be "full of the sound and fury of exclusiveness and signifying not so much after all". Smoking was forbidden at the club, and members were not permitted to entertain men. Accommodation was available.

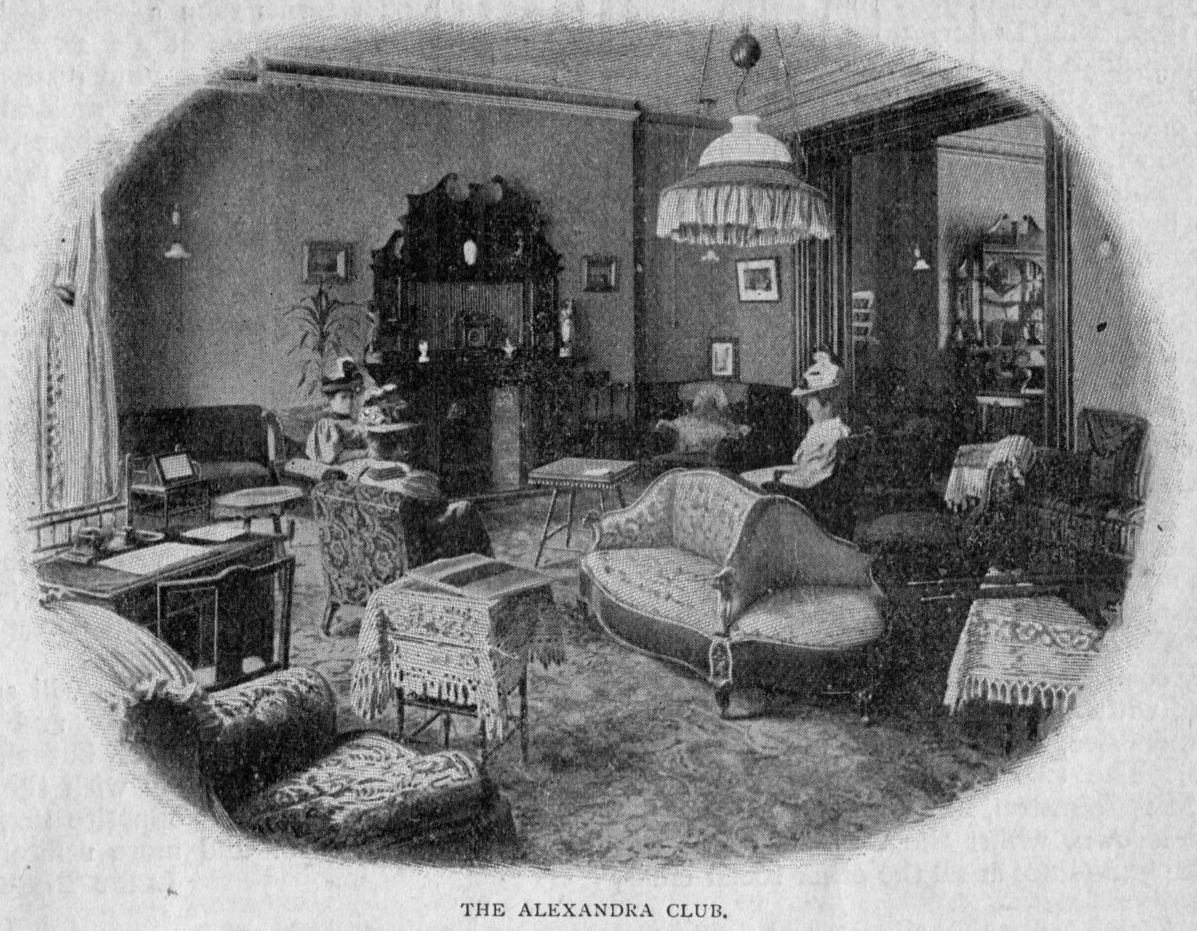
The Alexandra Club. Photograph from Cassell's Magazine.

The entrance fee was 5 guineas, with the annual subscription fee 4 guineas for members from the country, and 5 guineas for those in town. The popularity of the club led to disputes between members over the best tables those in which according to the historian Anne de Courcy, the "lunchers could be viewed in all their glory from the street". The Prince of Wales, visiting his wife, Princess Alexandra, was once denied entrance by the footman of the club. The prince's satisfaction over this caused him amusement and led him to say that the club was entitled to bear his wife's name as a result.
