= The Romance of a Shop =

Book by Amy Levy

- 1889 edition (publ. Cupples & Hurd)
- Author: Amy Levy
- Language: English
- Publication date: 1888

The Romance of a Shop is an 1888 novel by Amy Levy. The novel centers on the Lorimer sisters, who decide to open their own photography business after the death of their father leaves them in poverty. The novel examines the opportunities and difficulties of urban life for the "New Woman" in the late nineteenth century, maintaining their right to independent opinion and the questioning of social norms.

== Synopsis ==
The novel opens in April, shortly after the death of the Lorimers' father. The house and most of their belongings are to be sold in the coming week, leaving the four Lorimer sisters – Fanny, Gertrude, Lucy, and Phyllis – very poor. The young women realize that they must find a way to earn money in order to support themselves. Gertrude, the novel's central character, proposes that they open a studio and put their skills in photography to use. They decide that Gerty, Lucy, and Phyllis will operate the studio while Fanny acts as housekeeper.

Lucy departs for a three-month apprenticeship at the successful photography studio of a family friend while Gerty begins to seek a location for their own studio. She leases two floors with an attached studio at 20B Upper Baker Street which they can afford with the modest means left to them. The sisters, with help from their friends the Devonshires, labor through all of June to prepare the studio for its opening. The studio opens at the end of July after Lucy returns from her apprenticeship. The Lorimers receive steady business from friends and acquaintances through the fall, though many customers hold a prejudice and expect to pay less for their services than they would for male photographers. Soon the Lorimers are hired to photograph artists' works. They begin making connections within the artistic community of London.

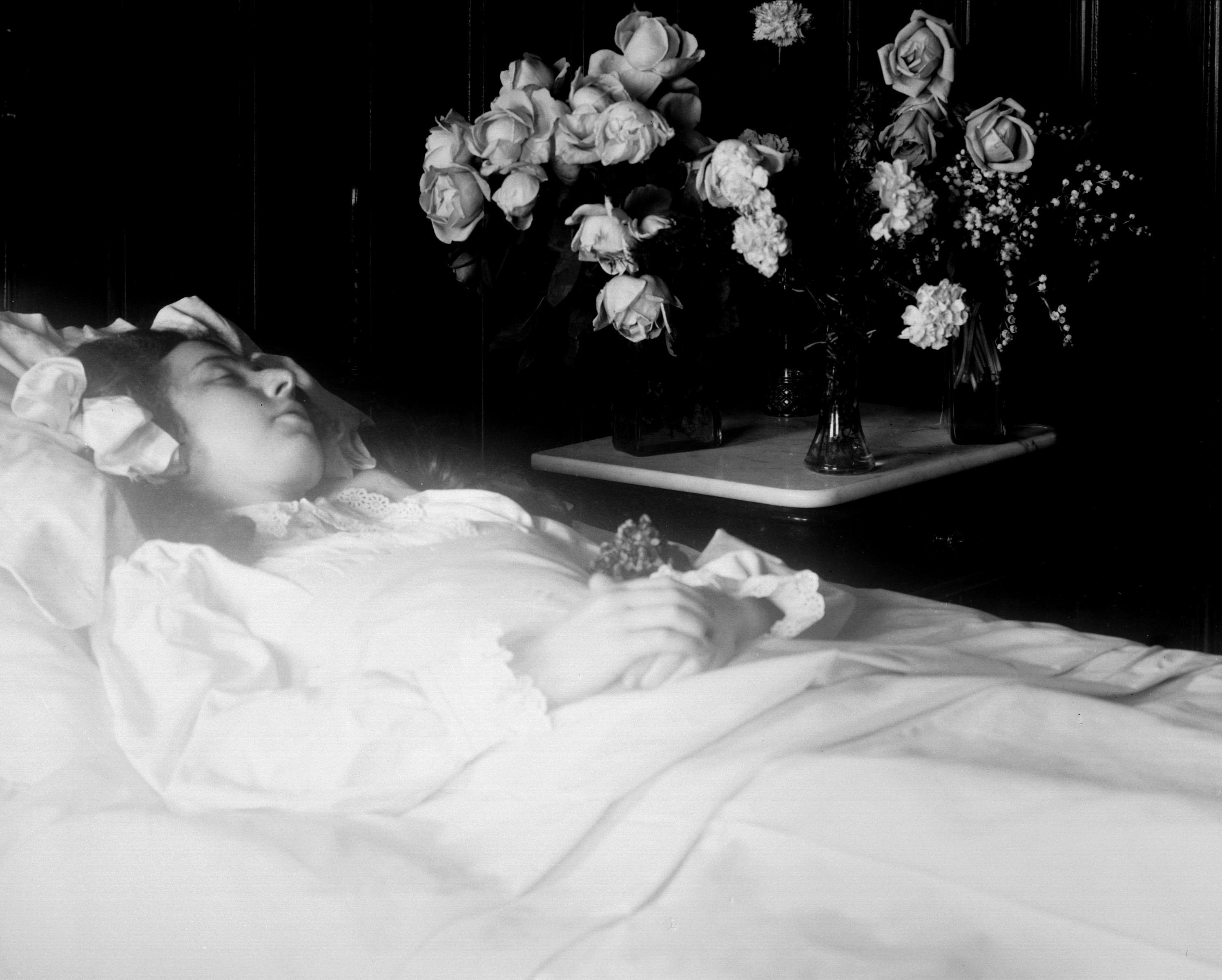
Post-mortem photography grew in popularity in the Victorian era.

One evening in October, a housekeeper arrives at the studio and requests their services to photograph the recently deceased Lady Watergate. Though the prospect makes Gertrude uncomfortable, she accepts the job. While Gerty photographs Lady Watergate, the motionless silence of the gloomy Lord Watergate leaves a vivid impression in Gerty's mind.

Frank Jermyn, an artist who lives across from the Lorimers, visits the shop to hire the sisters to photograph his work. In need of income, Lucy accepts the job and enters Frank's studio unaccompanied despite the social impropriety of the action. Frank recommends the Lorimers to his artistic acquaintances. Soon the Lorimers' business grows, and Frank becomes a common visitor and good friend to the sisters.

The Lorimers are hired to photograph the work of Sidney Darrell, a member of the Royal Academy prominent in London society. When Gerty arrives at his studio, she is uncomfortable and detects a lurking contempt behind his polite indifference. She self-consciously photographs Darrell's work and is relieved when her job is over.

In March, Frank invites the sisters to attend a showing of his work. Many members of the artistic community attend the event, including Mr. Darrell and Lord Watergate. Despite her shabby mourning clothes, Phyllis's beauty catches the attention of both men. After the Lorimers leave, Lord Watergate asks Frank if they might make photographs for him to use during his scientific lectures at the Royal Institution. Soon, the sisters receive more work from Lord Watergate as well as Mr. Darrell. Darrell soon invites the sisters to attend a private viewing of his own work, where he asks Phyllis if she will pose as Cressida for him. Gertrude does not like the idea but cannot stop the sessions from beginning. Under Fanny's supervision, Phyllis soon begins to sit regularly for Mr. Darrell. He gives her frequent gifts, and Phyllis enjoys Darrell's attention.

One evening in June, Frank Jermyn arrives at the Lorimers' unexpectedly. He tells the sisters that he is to leave for Africa the next day as a special reporter to make newspaper illustrations. Frank proposes to Lucy. They have each been fostering growing feelings for one another and Lucy joyfully accepts. Frank leaves for Africa the next morning.

Rumors surrounding Phyllis' modeling spread throughout the summer. Gerty is worried that Phyllis cares too much for Darrell. When Mr. Darrell announces that he must leave for Paris and cannot finish Phyllis' portrait, Phyllis is hurt by his unexpected departure.

In September, the girls learn of an ambush of British troops in Africa that leaves nearly all killed. However, Frank Jermyn is among those who are missing. Lucy soon departs to visit Frank's parents at their request in Cornwall in order to grieve together. Gertrude sees Lucy to the station. When she arrives back at the studio, she finds Lord Watergate there to discuss business. However, they find a note which Phyllis has left to say that she is running away to Italy with Mr. Darrell. Gerty and Lord Watergate are alarmed; Lord Watergate informs Gerty that Mr. Darrell is already married. The two rush off to Mr. Darrell's together but fear they will be too late to stop the pair. Gertrude and Watergate have arrived just in time. Gertrude storms into Darrell's studio and convinces Phyllis to return home over the protests of Mr. Darrell. Lord Watergate denounces Darrell as a scoundrel. Phyllis faints, and Gerty and Lord Watergate rush home with her. Phyllis is very unwell after this. She has consumption, and a physician tells Gerty that Phyllis' death within months is certain. Phyllis dies within a few weeks.

Lord Watergate pays Gertrude a visit a few weeks later with the news that there is a rumor that Frank has been seen alive. An emergency expedition finds Frank. By March, he has returned to London. Lucy and Frank are to be married immediately. Lucy will carry on the photography business after marriage. Gertrude's own future is uncertain, and she turns away Lord Watergate's advances in a tearful burst of emotion.

Weeks later, Frank and Lucy are married and away on honeymoon, and Gerty is left alone in the studio. She painfully reflects on her uncertain future and playing out the part of a "strong-minded woman" into which she had been cast. She regrets that she turned down a future of love when she sent Lord Watergate away. However, there is suddenly a knock at the door; Lord Watergate has returned in spite of Gerty's rejection. Gerty tells Lord Watergate that she did not reject him because she did not value his love, but because she was afraid of embracing the happiness he offered.

The novel's epilogue details the sisters' lives after marriage. Fanny and her husband remain happy together, but wish for children. Lucy and Frank have two children, but Lucy continues photography and specializes in children's portraits. The Watergates also have a child, and Gerty hopes he will inherit Lord Watergate's scientific mind.

== Major characters ==
- The Lorimer sisters

- Gertrude Lorimer: the novel's main character, and the most passionate of the sisters. She is 23 years old at the novel's opening and dreams of being a writer before putting it aside to make a living through photography. Gerty often takes charge of the situation, and is also regarded as the cleverest of the Lorimers. She speaks slightingly of her own plain looks.

- Lucy Lorimer: the most practical and rational of the Lorimer sisters, who is described as "fair, slight, upright as a dart." She describes herself as a "middling sort of person," and is 20 years old at the novel's opening.

- Phyllis Lorimer: the youngest and most beautiful of the Lorimers. Phyllis is often sickly, but is mischievous and spoiled by everyone around her. She is 17 years old when the novel opens.

- Fanny Lorimer: the oldest and most old-fashioned of the sisters. Fanny is a half-sister to the other Lorimers, and is 30 years old at the novel's beginning. She is concerned with domesticity and femininity, and is described as "a superannuated baby" and "an anachronism" with "just the sort of qualities men seem to think desirable in a wife and mother."

- Frank Jermyn: an artist who makes newspaper engravings for a living. He lives across from the Lorimers' studio and becomes a good friend of the sisters before eventually marrying Lucy.
- Sidney Darrell: a prominent London artist who invites the Lorimers to many social events. He asks Phyllis to pose for him as a model, and later they plan to leave for Italy together.
- Lord Watergate: a physiologist with connections in artistic circles, and a friend of Mr. Darrell. He first contacts the Lorimers to make post-mortem photographs of his deceased wife. Later he marries Gertrude.

== Historical background ==
=== Photography ===
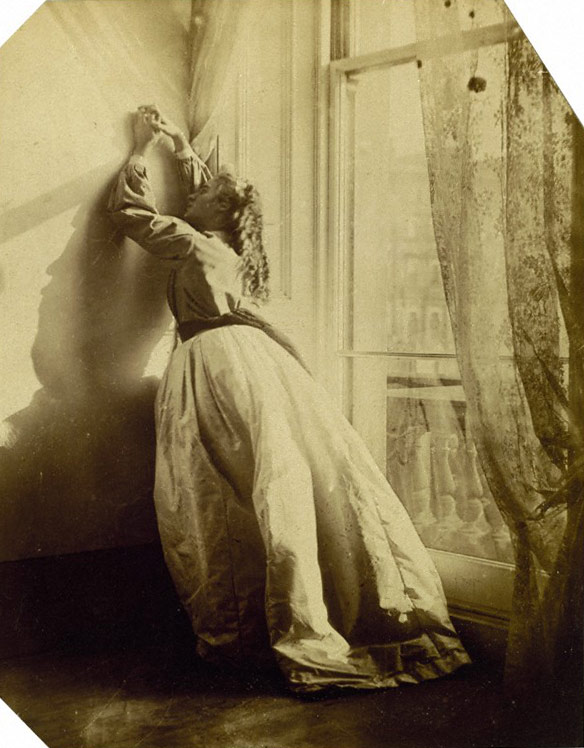
The work of artists like Clementina Hawarden in the mid-nineteenth century elevated photography to the realm of fine art.

By the 1880s, photography was a well-established as a medium used for many purposes, including portraiture, journalism and documentation. The work of artists such as Julia Margaret Cameron and Clementina Hawarden active in the mid-century helped advance the medium to the status of fine art. In the 1880s, there were nearly 300 photography studios in London. Commercial photography was widespread in its applications, and the many types of photographs which the Lorimers are hired to take, including photographic studies for artists, lecture slides, postmortem photography, and portraiture, were all common.

=== Imperial England ===
Britain's colonial empire serves as an essential backdrop for The Romance of a Shop; key plot developments center on Britain's imperial connection to faraway colonies. When Aunt Caroline initially tries to convince the girls to marry she considers sending them to India to find husbands, which "works wonders in that regard." Fanny initially rejects her suitor Mr. Marsh because he is poor, and leaving for Australia provides the opportunity for him to accumulate wealth over time and return to Britain with the resources to marry. British fighting in the African colonies calls Frank Jermyn away as an illustrator to report on war developments. His departure, possible death, and return is essential in the plot surrounding Lucy's courtship.

== Literary background ==
Levy inserts many autobiographical details in The Romance of a Shop; for example, Gerty's poem which is published in The Woodcut is actually Levy's own poem "A Game of Lawn-Tennis" which had been printed two years earlier and would be reprinted in Levy's posthumously published Plane-Tree one year later. Additionally, Levy places Lord Watergate's residence at the home where the Levy family lived from 1872 to 1884. Levy targeted a popular audience with Romance and strove for a commercially successful reception rather than significant literary achievement, a purpose which she reserved for her more serious work Reuben Sachs. In an 1888 correspondence to Violet Paget, Levy wrote demeaningly of her aspirations in writing The Romance of a Shop in comparison to Reuben Sachs, stating "I have purposely held in my hand." (Note: The correspondence quoted is included in Beckman's book as Letter 32.)

== Genre and style ==
In Amy Levy: Her Life and Letters, Linda Hunt Beckman calls The Romance of a Shop "a model of the realism of its age," citing its narrational style, use of contemporary speech and topical references, such as popular songs and novels, and its clear moral vision. Levy intended The Romance of a Shop to target a popular audience, and utilized literary themes and techniques readers would find familiar from other popular fiction of the time. In her introduction to The Romance of a Shop, Susan David Bernstein identifies the novel as "on the cusp of literary modernism," and states that "Levy's writing reflects a shifting consciousness, a mode of representation hovering between romance and realism, between idealized versions of remodeled lives for women and men, and the mundane hazards of such social change."

== Themes ==
=== The Woman Question ===
Gertrude, Lucy, and Phyllis Lorimer all portray aspects the "New Woman" of the late nineteenth century in their urban self-sufficiency, independent thought, and readiness to challenge accepted rules. One contemporary reviewer remarked that Gerty and Lucy both possess "the independence which is characteristic of the times." (Note: The review cited is from The Spectator.) However, Fanny's traditional nature serves as a comical foil to that of the progressive, younger Lorimers. In consequence, Fan is often dismissed as irritating or hapless by Gertrude.

=== The urban environment ===
Nearly all of The Romance of a Shop is set in urban London and revolves around specific neighborhoods and London establishments, with references to venues like the Grosvenor Gallery and the Reading Room of the British Museum. The urban environment is a source of both opportunity and danger for the Lorimers and the New Woman. While the city is an ideal place for the Lorimers' studio, they are also subject to the gossip which spreads surrounding their business and personal lives. The city streets offer a stage for the young women to move about freely and independently, especially on the recently introduced omnibuses, but can also facilitate danger for the girls, such as when Phyllis runs away with Mr. Darrell.

=== Gaze ===
The Lorimers' photographic lens highlights their ability to turn the gaze of society around them upon their photographic subjects. Levy's "women in business" are the producers of spectacles rather than the subject of them. As young women working for their livelihood and living independently in late-Victorian London, the sisters are subjected to a social stigma against women who work at all. "Through her characters' position as women in business and in their excursions in London, Levy employs discourses about the shopgirl to expose the difficulty women have in escaping the spectacle of their gender even as they articulate a space for themselves in the public spaces of the city." (Evans) The gendered dynamic of gaze is represented in The Romance of a Shop through Levy's references to others' judgmental gaze turned upon the Lorimers, such as Mr. Darrell's critical gaze cast over Gerty as she photographs his artwork, as well as inverted by Levy's emphasis on the Lorimers' "intensely modern young eyes" and the photographic lens they employ.

=== Commercial accommodation ===
The need for artists to adapt their craft to the commercial art market is present throughout The Romance of a Shop. (Note: As Beckman states, "An important theme throughout The Romance of a Shop is the artist's need to accommodate her or himself to the tastes of those who consume art as a commercial product – without sacrificing all standards of quality.") Frank Jermyn originally aspires to be a painter, but switches to work as an engraver for The Illustrated News instead. At the onset of the novel, Gerty is in the process of writing an ambitious verse-drama about Charlotte Corday, but abandons it to pursue commercial photography. Later, when one of her poems is published in a popular magazine alongside one of Frank's engravings, Gerty plaintively muses "It is rather a come down after Charlotte Corday, isn't it?" to which Frank responds "We all have to get off our high horse, Miss Lorimer, if we want to live." As Linda Beckman points out, in targeting a popular audience with The Romance of a Shop, Levy accepts, like Gerty, the commodification of fiction and sets an example to show that a commercially viable work and artistic merit need not be mutually exclusive.

== Contemporary reviews ==
The Romance of a Shop was met with generally positive regard. The Spectator called it "decidedly a success" and commented that "the dialogue is bright and sometimes witty, and the reader's attention, hardened novel reader though he may be, is fully sustained." An October 26, 1888 review in British Weekly called it "touched by a true artist's hand" with "flashes of wit on every page" and claimed that "a more charming story we have not read for a long time." The Jewish Chronicle, to which Levy was a contributor, praised The Romance of a Shop as a "bright and animated novel" but voiced concerns regarding Phyllis' "tendency to rather vulgar slang."

As Levy's first work of fiction, The Romance of a Shop was the first time many reviewers were introduced to Levy as an author. Many expressed their optimism for Levy's growth as a writer in the future. A November 24, 1888 review in The Graphic stated of Levy "Her novel gives not only promise for the future [of Levy's career], but much present interest and pleasure." However, others gave Romance itself only tempered praise, such as a November 10, 1888 review in The Academy beginning "It appears to us that with a little more experience Miss Amy Levy may write a very good novel," but that "some scraps and bits of character drawing here and there [...] carry the reader pleasantly through for the present, and give good promise to the future." (Note: Included in Bernstein, pg. 97, from George Saintsbury, "New Novels," The Academy (10 November 1888):301-03)

In his 1890 obituary for Levy in The Woman's World, Oscar Wilde praised The Romance of a Shop as "a bright and clever story, full of sparkling touches."
