= Life's Shop Window =

1914 silent drama film directed by J. Gordon Edwards

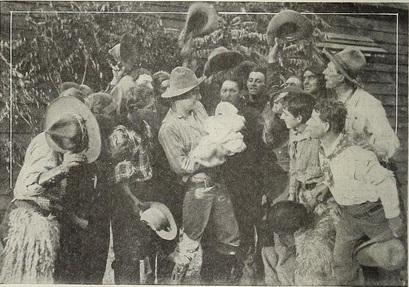
- Lydia Wilton's baby is presented to the Anderson farm
- Directed by: J. Gordon Edwards
- Screenplay by: Mary Asquith
- Based on: Life's Shop Window by Victoria Cross
- Produced by: William Fox, Box Office Attraction Company
- Starring: Claire Whitney; Stuart Holmes
- Cinematography: Harry Fischbeck
- Distributed by: Box Office Attraction Film Company
- Release date: November 19, 1914
- Running time: 86 minutes
- Country: United States

Life's Shop Window is a 1914 American silent drama film directed by J. Gordon Edwards and starring Claire Whitney and Stuart Holmes. It is a film adaptation of the 1907 novel of the same name by Annie Sophie Cory. The film depicts the story of English orphan Lydia Wilton (Whitney), and her husband Bernard Chetwin (Holmes). Although Wilton's marriage is legitimate, it was conducted in secret, and she is accused of having a child out of wedlock. Forced to leave England, she reunites with her husband in Arizona. There, she is tempted by infidelity with an old acquaintance, Eustace Pelham, before seeing the error of her ways and returning to her family.

Life's Shop Window was the first film produced by both William Fox and his Box Office Attraction Film Company, the main corporate predecessor to Fox Film. Several reviewers approved of the film's expurgated treatment of the novel's plot, although opinions of the quality of the film itself were mixed. It proved very popular upon its initial release in New York, and that success was used to advertise the film elsewhere. Like many of Fox's early works, it was likely lost in the 1937 Fox vault fire.

== Plot ==
Bernard Chetwin is a boarder at John Anderson's farm in England. He is unimpressed by Anderson's spoiled daughter Bella, but is attracted to their orphaned servant, Lydia Wilton. She tells him of her dreams for a happier life, and they fall in love. Wilton also meets Eustace Pelham, who introduces her to his philosophy of "life's shop window": that many people make life decisions on purely superficial grounds. Chetwin marries Wilton in a secret ceremony.

Intending to establish a farm to support his new family, Chetwin leaves the English countryside for Arizona. Concerned about the dangers of frontier territory, he travels without his newlywed wife, intending to send for her later. When she gives birth to Chetwin's child, Anderson's wife refuses to accept evidence of her marriage, and throws her out of the farm for having a child out of wedlock. She takes the infant with her to Arizona and reunites with Chetwin at his ranch.

The demands of managing the ranch consume all of Chetwin's time, leaving Wilton to feel neglected and unloved. One day, a traveler is injured near the ranch, whom she recognizes as Pelham. Pelham courts her, taking advantage of her loneliness. Although she admits she does not love him, he convinces her to abandon her family and run away with him. As she is preparing to depart, she is confronted by Starlight, an Indian woman who works as a servant on the ranch, who reminds Wilton of the needs of her child. She spurns Pelham and returns to her family. Eventually, Chetwin forgives her and devotes more of his time to her. Pelham may have been killed by Starlight, although his ultimate fate is left unclear.

== Cast ==
Herald

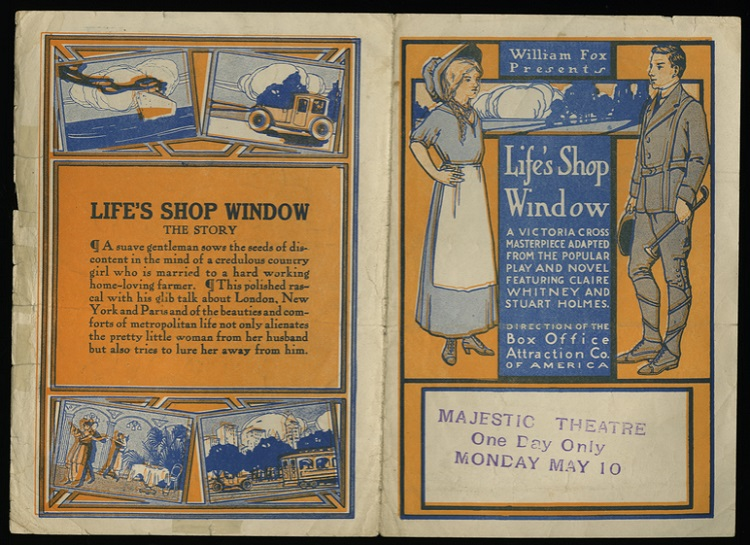
Exterior of a herald, a type of brochure, advertising the film

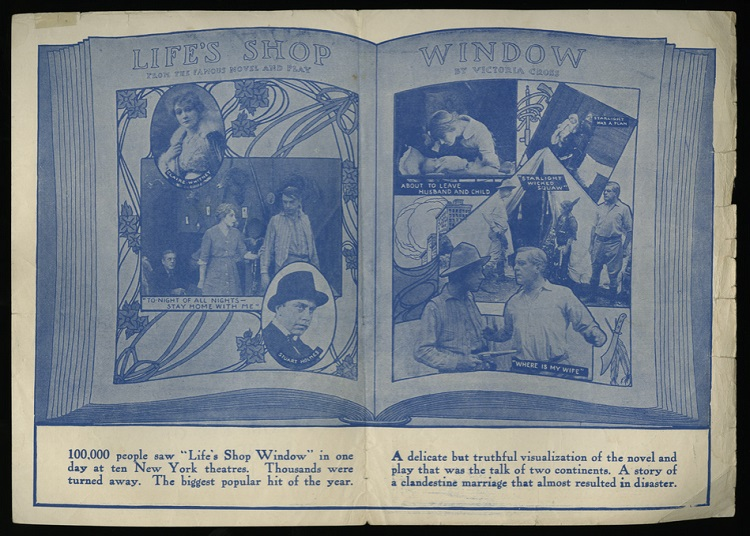
Interior, describing the film's success in New York

- Claire Whitney as Lydia Wilton
- Stuart Holmes as Bernard Chetwin
- Walter Hitchcock as Eustace Pelham
- Theresa Michelena as Starlight

== Production ==
Annie Sophie Cory, writing as Victoria Cross, was a popular but controversial British New Woman novelist. Adultery and female sexuality are common themes in her works, which often reversed the expected gender roles of the time, permitting female desire to motivate the plot. Elizabeth Bisland described Lydia, the main character of Cory's 1907 novel Life's Shop Window, as "a very modernist heroine", comparing her to a more socially successful Hester Prynne. Like many of Cross's novels, it attracted controversy, and was banned for a time by the Circulating Libraries Association in the United Kingdom. Life's Shop Window had already become the basis of a successful play, based on an expurgated version of the novel's plot.

In 1914, William Fox was operating the successful film distributor Box Office Attraction Film Company. Box Office purchased films from studios such as Balboa Amusement Producing Company, showing them in Fox's New York area theaters and renting prints to exhibitors elsewhere in the country. Life's Shop Window may have originally been considered for production in this manner. However, Fox decided he was unwilling to depend on others for the products his business required, and instead prepared to produce his own films under the Box Office Attraction Film Company name. He purchased the Éclair film studio in Fort Lee, New Jersey and property in Staten Island, arranged for actors and crew, and began production with an adaptation of an established work, as was common at the time.

Rights to the film adaptation were purchased for $100. (Note: equivalent to $3,214 in 2025 dollars) Like the theatrical adaptation, Mary Asquith's screenplay removed much of the book's controversial sexual elements, censorship intended to make Fox's nascent studio appear more respectable to the industry. Fox selected J. Gordon Edwards to direct, in what may have been his directorial debut; credit for the earlier St. Elmo is disputed, with sources disagreeing whether Edwards or Bertram Bracken directed.

Filming for Life's Shop Window took place at a farm on the Staten Island property, and possibly in the Fort Lee studio. The budget for this five-reel feature film was small, with the cost of production reported as $4,500 (Note: equivalent to $144,643 in 2025 dollars) or $6,000; (Note: equivalent to $192,857 in 2025 dollars) Fox would exaggerate the cost of production to over thirty times its true value in later advertising. At the time, films of comparable length generally required between $20,000 and $30,000 to produce. (Note: equivalent to between $642,857 and 964,286 in 2025 dollars) Film historian Terry Ramsaye reported that Fox was not pleased with the completed film and initially declared: "Let's burn the damn thing", before being convinced to allow its release. Life's Shop Window premiered at the Academy of Music in New York on October 20, 1914, although it did not receive its official release until November 19.

== Reception and legacy ==
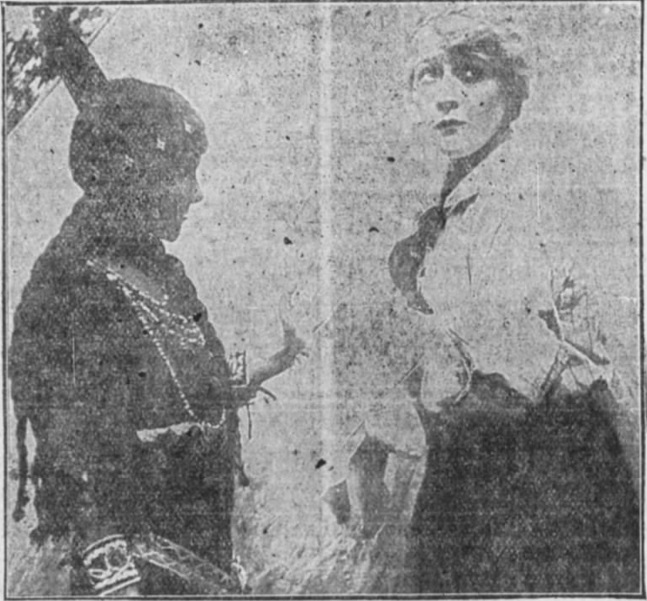
Michelena and Whitney in a publicity still

Contemporary reviews were mixed. Moving Picture World's film critic W. Stephen Bush called the film "first-class" despite problems with the plot, cinematography, and the "unbelievably poor" music accompaniment at the Academy of Music. He also remarked on the censorship of the novel's plot, stating that "not even the sternest of moralists can find anything objectionable" in the film. Fox's response was published the following week, in which he praised Bush's review and committed to avoiding "the salacious or the sex drama". Peter Milne of Motion Picture News also praised the decision to make a "clean" adaptation of the novel, as well as the film's realism. However, Variety gave the film a negative review that criticized its editing, its direction, and Whitney's acting ability, suggesting that the film would profit solely on the name of the book it adapted.

Despite some critical reviews, the film was popular, especially with women, and financially successful. Double-file lines over a block long were reported for opening-week showings at the Audubon Theatre in New York. After the incorporation of the Fox Film Corporation, distribution of this film continued under the new company's name. The success of the initial New York showings featured in subsequent advertising, as did Fox's greatly inflated claims of the cost of production.

The 1937 Fox vault fire destroyed most of Fox's silent films, probably including Life's Shop Window. The Library of Congress is not aware of any extant copies.

== See also ==
- List of lost silent films (1910–1914)

== Bibliography ==
- Finler, Joel W. (2003). The Hollywood Story. Wallflower Press. ISBN 978-1-903364-66-6.
- Forward, Stephanie (1999). "Victoria Cross(e)". In Sage, Lorna (ed.). The Cambridge Guide to Women's Writing in English. Cambridge University Press. p. 159. ISBN 978-0-521-66813-2.
- Golden, Eve (1996). Vamp: The Rise and Fall of Theda Bara. Vestal Press. ISBN 978-1-879511-32-3.
- Jura, Jean-Jacques; Bardin, Rodney Norman (2007). Balboa Films: A History and Filmography of the Silent Film Studio. McFarland. ISBN 978-0-7864-3098-7.
- Koszarski, Richard (2005). Fort Lee: The Film Town (1904–2004). Indiana University Press. ISBN 978-0-86196-652-3.
- Nelson, Carolyn Christensen, ed. (2000). A New Woman Reader: Fiction, Articles and Drama of the 1890s. Broadview Press. ISBN 978-1-55111-295-4.
- Ramsaye, Terry (1964) [1926]. A Million and One Nights: A History of the Motion Picture. Routledge. ISBN 978-0-7146-1588-2.
- Shepherd, David J. (2013). The Bible on Silent Film: Spectacle, Story and Scripture in the Early Cinema. Cambridge University Press. ISBN 978-1-107-04260-5.
- Slide, Anthony (2000). Nitrate Won't Wait: A History of Film Preservation in the United States. McFarland. ISBN 978-0-7864-0836-8.
- Slide, Anthony (2001). The New Historical Dictionary of the American Film Industry (2nd ed.). Scarecrow Press. ISBN 978-1-57886-015-9.
- Solomon, Aubrey (2011). The Fox Film Corporation, 1915–1935: A History and Filmography. McFarland. ISBN 978-0-7864-6286-5.
- Tarbox, Charles H. (1983). Lost Films 1895–1917. Jef Films. ISBN 978-0-9610916-0-6.
- Wilson, Nicola (2013). "Circulating Morals (1900–1915)". In Bradshaw, David; Potter, Rachel (eds.). Prudes on the Prowl: Fiction and Obscenity in England, 1850 to the Present Day. Oxford University Press. pp. 52–70. ISBN 978-0-19-969756-4.
