= Amy Levy =

English essayist, poet and novelist (1861–1889)

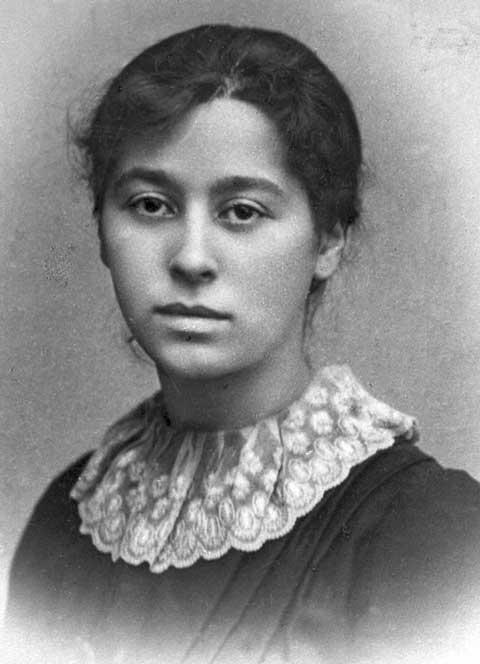
- Born: Amy Judith Levy; 10 November 1861; Clapham, London, England
- Died: 9 September 1889 (aged 27); Endsleigh Gardens, London, England
- Resting place: Balls Pond Road Cemetery
- Education: Brighton and Hove High School; Newnham College, Cambridge
- Occupations: Essayist, poet, novelist

Amy Judith Levy (10 November 1861 – 9 September 1889) (Note: Some sources give Levy's date of death as 10 September; however, her obituary and tombstone indicate that her actual date of death was 9 September.) was an English essayist, poet, and novelist. One of the first Jewish students at both Cambridge University and Newnham College, she wrote on the situation of Jews in Europe and the challenges facing women who sought independence in male-dominated society. She maintained close relationships with other women living what would be called a "New Woman" life, some of whom were lesbians.

== Biography ==
=== Early life and education ===
Levy was born in Clapham, an affluent district of London, on 10 November 1861, to Lewis and Isobel Levy. She was the second of seven children born into a Jewish family with a "casual attitude toward religious observance", who sometimes attended a Reform synagogue in Upper Berkeley Street, the West London Synagogue. As an adult, Levy continued to identify herself as Jewish and wrote for The Jewish Chronicle.

Levy showed an interest in literature from an early age. At 13, she wrote a criticism of Elizabeth Barrett Browning's feminist work Aurora Leigh; at 14, Levy's first poem, "Ida Grey: A Story of Woman's Sacrifice", was published in the journal Pelican. Her family was supportive of women's education and encouraged Amy's literary interests; in 1876, she was sent to Brighton and Hove High School and later studied at Newnham College, Cambridge. Levy was the first Jewish student at Newnham when she arrived in 1879 but left before her final year.

Her circle of friends included Clementina Black, Ellen Wordsworth Darwin, Dollie Radford, Eleanor Marx (daughter of Karl Marx), and Olive Schreiner. While travelling in Florence in 1886, Levy met Vernon Lee, a fiction writer and literary theorist six years her senior, and fell in love with her. Both women went on to explore the themes of sapphic love in their works. Lee inspired Levy's poem "To Vernon Lee".

=== Literary career ===
The Romance of a Shop (1888), Levy's first novel, is regarded as an early "New Woman" novel and depicts four sisters who experience the difficulties and opportunities afforded to women running a business in 1880s London. Levy wrote her second novel, Reuben Sachs (1888), to fill the literary need for "serious treatment ... of the complex problem of Jewish life and Jewish character", which she identified and discussed in a 1886 article "The Jew in Fiction."

Levy wrote stories, essays, and poems for popular or literary periodicals; the stories "Cohen of Trinity" and "Wise in Their Generation", both published in Oscar Wilde's magazine The Woman's World, are among her most notable. In 1886, Levy began writing a series of essays on Jewish culture and literature for The Jewish Chronicle, including The Ghetto at Florence, The Jew in Fiction, Jewish Humour, and Jewish Children.

Levy's works of poetry, including the daring A Ballad of Religion and Marriage, reveal her feminist concerns. Xantippe and Other Verses (1881) includes "Xantippe", a poem in the voice of Socrates's wife; the volume A Minor Poet and Other Verse (1884) includes more dramatic monologues as well as lyric poems. Her final book of poems, A London Plane-Tree (1889), contains lyrics that are among the first to show the influence of French symbolism.

=== Sexuality ===
Levy remains a topic of discussion amongst scholars in terms of whether or not she is to be considered a Victorian Lesbian writer. She had sent several poems to her friend Violet Paget (the pen name of Vernon Lee), confessing her love. These poems include her famous works "To Vernon Lee" and "New Love, New Life." Both of these pieces express messages of unrequited love to another woman. Scholars continue to debate if these gestures were that of friendship or intense passion.

=== Death ===
Levy experienced episodes of major depression from an early age. In her later years, her depression worsened in connection to her distress surrounding her romantic relationships and her awareness of her growing deafness. On 9 September 1889, two months away from her 28th birthday, she died by suicide "at the residence of her parents ... [at] Endsleigh Gardens" by inhaling carbon monoxide. Oscar Wilde wrote an obituary for her in The Women's World in which he praised her gifts. The first Jewish woman to be cremated in England, her ashes were buried at Balls Pond Road Cemetery in London.

== Legacy ==
In 1993, Melyvn New produced a compilation of Levy's works, published as The Complete Novels and Selected Writings of Amy Levy: 1861–1889. On November 13, 2025, University of Cambridge announced that they had acquired and unsealed Levy's personal archive, which includes letters, draft manuscripts, photographs and diary entries. The collection was previously owned by a private corporation.

== Selected works ==
- Xantippe and Other Verse (1881)
- A Minor Poet and Other Verse (1884)
- The Romance of a Shop (1888) novel (republished in 2005 by Black Apollo Press)
- Reuben Sachs: A Sketch (1888) (republished in 2001 by Persephone Books)
- A London Plane-Tree and Other Verse (1889)
- Miss Meredith (1889; a novel)
- The Complete Novels and Selected Writings of Amy Levy: 1861–1889 (1993)
- The Collected Poems (Sublunary Editions, 2023)
- Amy Levy: Collected Writings (Library of the Jewish People, 2023)
