= Lower Grosvenor Street =

Former street in the City of Westminster, London

Coordinates: 51.5113°N 0.1488°W

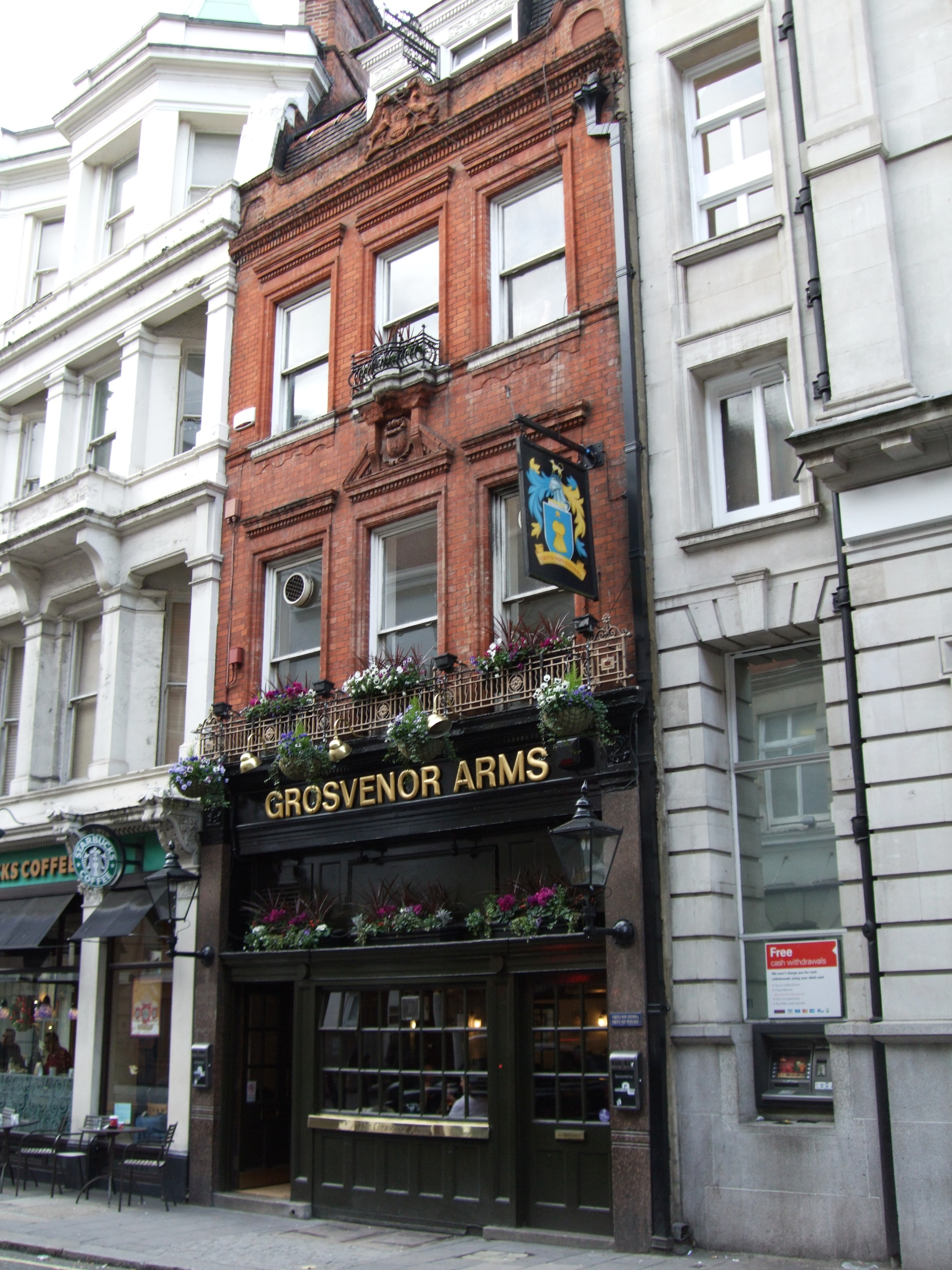
The Grosvenor Arms at 2 Grosvenor Street (formerly Lower Grosvenor Street)

Lower Grosvenor Street was a street in London, England, and renamed Grosvenor Street. which is at the south-eastern corner of Grosvenor Square and extends eastward towards Bond Street. Count de Melfort, in his Impressions of England, described the street as consisting of "a great number of excellent houses, the majority of which are inhabited by titled persons and affluent families".

- 12 Lower Grosvenor Street was home to the Alexandra Club, a private members club for women in Edwardian London. The club was founded in 1884, and closed in 1939.
- 16 Lower Grosvenor Street was for some time the home of the Royal Institute of British Architects.
- 46 was built by William Benson in 1725. In 1899 it was purchased by Sir Edgar Speyer, who had the building remodelled by Detmar Blow in 1910–11. After the first World War, it was used as the American Women's Club of London and later became the Japanese Embassy.
- 49 was, from the 1920s, the location of the Sesame Club, a social and educational club. Following amalgamation of other clubs, it was renamed the Sesame Imperial and Pioneer Club.
- 74 Grosvenor Street was the headquarters of the Society of Women Musicians from 1920. Concerts featuring music by Society members were held there.
