= The Story of a Modern Woman =

Novel by English author Ella Hepworth Dixon

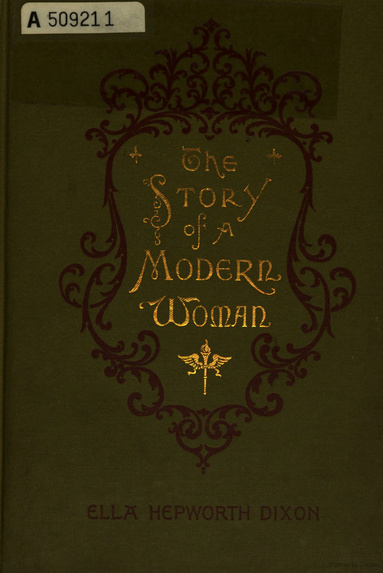
- 1894 cover
- Author: Ella Hepworth Dixon
- Language: English
- Genre: Fiction
- Publisher: William Heinemann
- Publication date: 1894
- Publication place: England
- Media type: Print
- Pages: 271
- OCLC: 27754292

The Story of a Modern Woman is a novel written by English author Ella Hepworth Dixon. The novel was first published in 1894 and is an example of the "New Woman" genre of late-Victorian England. The life of the protagonist, Mary Erle, loosely follows that of Hepworth Dixon: both the author and the character turned to journalism as a way of sustaining themselves after the death of their fathers.
