= Annie Sophie Cory =

British writer

Annie Sophie Cory (1 October 1868 – 2 August 1952) was a British author of popular, racy, exotic New Woman novels under the pseudonyms Victoria Cross(e), Vivian Cory and V.C. Griffin.

== Life ==
Annie Sophie Cory was the youngest of three daughters born to Colonel Arthur Cory and his wife Fanny Elizabeth Griffin. Her older sisters were the poet Adela Florence Nicolson and the editor Isabell Tate, who edited the Sind Gazette in India.

She was born in Rawalpindi, Punjab, and was also baptized there on 27 October 1868. Her father was employed in the British army at Lahore, where he was editor of the Lahore arm of The Civil and Military Gazette. Despite her parents' sojourn in India, they eventually returned to England, having maintained ties to their native country. Cory attended London University at nineteen years old in 1888, but did not graduate. In the 1891 England Census, Cory is listed as residing at 35 Tavistock Crescent, Paddington, London with her mother.

After Arthur's death in 1903, Annie traveled extensively over the Continent with her maternal uncle, Heneage McKenzie Griffin, who was the owner of the Seven-Thirty silver mine in Boulder, Colorado and prominently involved in the mining industry as one of its richest entrepreneurs. They lived together from 1916 to 1939, until his death in Italy. Having been bequeathed her uncle's entire fortune, Cory settled in Monte Carlo to live with female friends. She also had a residence at 8 Via Cantonale Legano, Switzerland. After her death in Milan, Italy, Cory was buried beside her uncle in 1952. She left £87,304 10s 8d in her will.

== Writing career ==
Annie Sophie's most established pseudonym was Victoria Cross. According to The Bookman, she chose this pseudonym, "because her initials are V.C. and...she is the descendent of a V.C." (Victoria Cross medal recipient).

She had her first piece, Theodora, a Fragment, published in The Yellow Book in 1895. In the same year she wrote The Woman Who Didn't, a response to Grant Allen's book The Woman Who Did. Anna Lombard (1901) was her most successful novel, in which a woman convinces her husband to allow her to continue an extra-marital affair with an Indian. In Six Chapters of a Man's Life (1903), narrated by Cecil, an Englishman working in the East, details his love affair with Theodora, who accompanies him out of love to Port Said, Egypt, disguised for her safety as a male. Once her true sex is revealed to Egyptian males through an impulsive kiss from her lover, Theodora is assaulted and disfigured, returning to Cecil after a week spent as a captive in a brothel. Though their love endures, Theodora drowns herself to escape the shame of her experience.

=== Reception ===
While praising Anna Lombard's "great success" despite its racy themes, William Thomas Stead reviewed its companion volume Life of my Heart (1905) with concern over its clear portrayal of interracial relationships as a positive development. He complained, "Victoria Cross has done a daring thing in thus exalting the sacrifice of everything for the love of a bronze archangel in disguise, and if she had not idealised her lover in the latter part of the book, she would have gone perilously near suggesting that the best thing a girl can do is to elope with the best-looking fellow – white or coloured makes no matter – who crosses her path...But what, in the name of fortune, makes Victoria Cross so crazy about exalting the superiority of natives as husbands over the typical Anglo-Indian?" Describing the passion of Cory's plot and language in the recently published novel Tomorrow? (1904), The Navy and Army Illustrated remarks, "The image that comes to mind...is that of a falling star; a white-hot thing rushing straight and swift through darkness to be lost in darkness. There is no stopping or turning aside; all is straight, swift motion to the end, and the swifter the star travels through the gloom, the more friction there is, so to speak. Between passion and unhappiness, the whiter and fiercer it glowers...Miss Victoria Cross writes in a white heat of passion."

A feminist utopian fantasy, Martha Brown MP (1935), Cory's last novel, describes a future in which women rule England.

=== Themes ===
Cory's stories often detail behaviors and desires unusual in the Victorian period such as female cross-dressing, unbridled and unashamed sexual desire, longing for and fear of interracial sexual relationships, and questioning of traditional heterosexual gender roles for men and women.

== Legacy ==
Though her reputation as a writer of New Woman fiction is now more obscure, Cory is remembered chiefly as an author of decadent literature.

Fate Knows No Tears (2008) by Mary Talbot Cross is a fictional retelling of the life of Cory's sister Adela as a young woman in India; Annie Sophie appears as a secondary character in the novel.

== Publications ==
The following list is based on A Companion to On-line & Off-line Literature.

- The Woman Who Didn't (1895; original title: Consummation; retitled by John Lane for his Keynotes series as a response to Grant Allen's The Woman Who Did)
- Paula (1896)
- A Girl of the Klondike (1899)
- Anna Lombard (1901)
- Six Chapters of a Man's Life (1903)
- To-morrow? (1904)
- The Religion of Evelyn Hastings (1905)
- Life of My Heart (1905)
- Six Women (1906)
- Life's Shop-Window (1907) Filmed (1914) as Life's Shop Window)
- Five Nights (1908)
- The Eternal Fires (1910)
- The Love of Kusuma (1910)
- Self and the Other (1911)
- The Life Sentence (1912)
- The Night of Temptation (1912)
- The Greater Law (a.k.a. Hilda Against The World) (1914)
- Daughters of Heaven (short stories, 1920)
- Over Life's Edge (1921)
- The Beating Heart (short stories, 1924)
- Electric Love (1929)
- The Unconscious Sinner (a.k.a. The Innocent Sinner) (1931)
- A Husband's Holiday (1932)
- The Girl in the Studio (1934)
- Martha Brown, MP (1935)
- Jim (1937)
