= Anna Lombard =

Book by Annie Sophie Cory

- Author: Annie Sophie Cory (as Victoria Cross)
- Genre: New Woman novel
- Publication date: 1901

Anna Lombard is a New Woman novel by British writer Annie Sophie Cory, writing as Victoria Cross. First published in 1901, it is based on the idea that it takes a New Man as well to form a perfect union of the sexes.

== Literary significance and criticism ==
In the Preface to her novel, Victoria Cross claims that she "endeavoured to draw in Gerald Ethridge a character whose actions should be in accordance with the principles laid down by Christ, one that would display, not in words but in his actual life, that gentleness, humility, patience, charity, and self-sacrifice that our Redeemer himself enjoined. [...] Fearlessly, and with the Gospel of Christ in my hand, I offer this example of his teaching to the great Christian public for its verdict, confident that I shall be justified by it."

Anna Lombard ultimately sold more than six million copies and went through more than 40 editions. It received favourable (William Thomas Stead, who praised the idea of gender role reversal) and less favourable reviews; the authors of the latter group, which included Christian critics, dismissed the novel as a piece of transgressional fiction violating law—advocating or at least justifying infanticide—, convention, and contemporary sensibility by constructing an image of British female sexuality that had rarely been conceived in any detail outside of pornographic texts, for example the notion that a sexually experienced woman is an asset to a marriage.

As such a sensation novel, Anna Lombard is mentioned in Katherine Mansfield's 1908 short story, "The Tiredness of Rosabel," where a young working-class woman reading a "cheap, paper-covered edition" on the bus is completely absorbed in the book.
