= Ella Hepworth Dixon =

English author and editor (1857–1932)

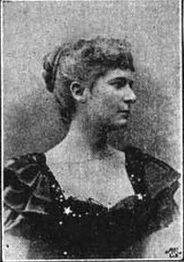
- Born: 27 March 1857; Marylebone, London, England
- Died: 12 January 1932 (aged 74); London, England
- Occupations: Author, editor
- Writing career
- Pen name: Margaret Wynman
- Language: English
- Genre: novels
- Notable work: The Story of a Modern Woman

Ella Hepworth Dixon (27 March 1857 – 12 January 1932) was an English author and editor who wrote under the pen name Margaret Wynman. Her best-known work is the New Woman novel The Story of a Modern Woman, which has been reprinted in the 21st century.

== Early life and education ==
Dixon was born on 27 March 1857 at Essex Villa, Queens Road, Marylebone, London. She was the seventh child in a family of eight born to the Manchester-born William Hepworth Dixon (1821–1879) and Marian MacMahon Dixon, who came from Ireland. William was an editor, and literature and the arts were valued in their house for boys and for girls. His position also brought a circle of writers and thinkers to the house, including Geraldine Jewsbury, T. H. Huxley, Richard Francis Burton, Lord Bulwer Lytton, Sir John Everett Millais, and E. M. Ward.

Dixon received an outstanding education for a young woman at her time, studying briefly at Heidelberg. She and her sister Marion trained at the Academie Julianne and they exhibited their work in the UK before their father died in 1879. Money was tight and she took to writing, so exploiting her family's connections.

== Career ==
=== Editor ===
In 1888, she accepted Oscar Wilde's offer to become the editor of The Woman's World. She also edited the magazine The Englishwoman from 1895.

Dixon's magazine, The Englishwoman, contained 22 distinct and separate features, and catered for all sorts and conditions of women. There were pages with sports stories; "Society's Doings", edited by "Belle", included "wedding of the month"; "In Fashion-land" by Mrs. Aria, included a critical review of the vagaries of dressmakers; literature was covered in "Under the Lamp," by Marion Hepworth Dixon. In addition to the special features of this magazine, the first part of it included short fiction, which was common to others similar to it. Advertised as being an illustrated magazine of fiction, fashion, society, and the home, it contained stories by popular authors of the day, as well as articles of general interest, interviews with celebrities, monthly prize competitions, and articles on topics connected with the house and home. The periodical was published at sixpence a month by F. V. White & Company.

=== Writer ===
Among her other works (written as Margaret Wynman) was My Flirtations, described by the American bibliophile Robert Lee Wolff as "a lively and catty series of sketches of [Dixon's] beaux, including the homosexuals, whom she virtually so identifies."

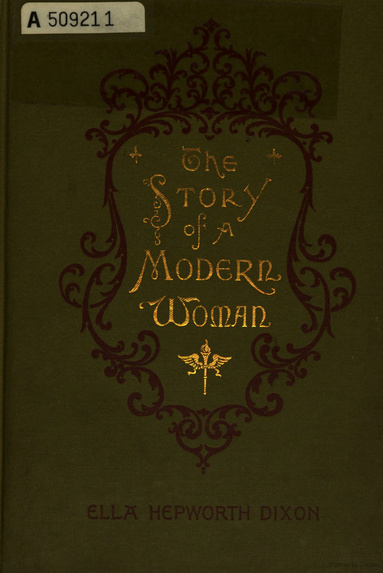
The Story of a Modern Woman (1894 cover)

The Story of a Modern Woman (1894) is described by Lorna Sage in the Cambridge Guide to Women's Writing in English (1999) as "a harrowing account of a woman's attempts to survive economically and emotionally when left alone after her father's death. A tale of valiant and unrewarded courage, the novel's only hope for redemption is in women's helping each other to survive in a society which is founded on the 'acquiescent feminine smile'." The Bloomsbury Dictionary of English Literature (1997) considers it "one of the most moving of the New Woman novels." It was translated into French, and also led to the nickname the "New Woman" for its author.

Literary socializing took up much of her time, but she continued to write stories and articles. One Doubtful Hour was a collection of stories, and As I Knew Them autobiographical. Her one-act play The Toy-Shop of the Heart was produced in London in 1908.

== Personal life ==
Dixon died in London on 12 January 1932 at the age of 74.
