= The Woman's World =

Defunct Victorian women magazine

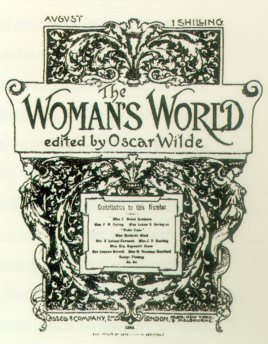
Cover of The Woman's World

The Woman's World was a Victorian women's magazine published by Cassell between 1886 and 1890, edited by Oscar Wilde between 1887 and 1889, and by Ella Hepworth Dixon from 1888..

== Foundation ==
In the late nineteenth century, the market for periodicals was growing, and interest from women, who had always been the larger part of the market for fiction, increasing. Cassell and Co. launched a new magazine, The Lady's World in October 1886, intended to appeal to an aspirant middle-class audience of lady readers. It concentrated on fashion and trends among high society. Impressed by Wilde's journalism on the Pall Mall Gazette, Wemyss Reid, the General Manager of Cassell & Co., wrote to Wilde in April 1887, enclosing several copies of the magazine. Wilde replied interestedly and suggested possible changes to the magazine. In May, he signed a contract for the editorship to work two mornings a week and paid a weekly salary of £6.

== Wilde's editorship ==
Wilde persuaded the publisher to change the title to The Woman's World, the change of description indicated it positioned itself towards an emerging class of educated women reflecting their changing place in society: Wilde designed it as "the first social magazine for women". Stephen Calloway and David Colvin characterized the change as one which eliminated connotations of "bas-bourgeois snobbery and reflected his advanced views on female emancipation". The titular change was part of a wider strategy of focusing more on what women "think and feel" and not exclusively on what they wear.

Serious articles about women in education and politics accompanied style and society notes, short fiction and poetry and biographical pieces on famous, usually aristocratic, women. The Woman's World addressed an élite but expanding readership of middle and upper class educated women with literary and social credentials.

Wilde managed to entice contributions from well-known writers and distinguished figures including, Elisabeth of Wied (the Queen of Romania), Princess Christian and Marie Corelli. He even asked Queen Victoria to submit poems, but was refused. The magazine continued to publish articles on high society trends and fashion, but with a more artistic slant. Sarah Bernhardt wrote an essay on "The history of my tea gown", and Wilde offered to write an article in her name about her American tour. Charles Ricketts also contributed.

Wilde wrote a column of literary notes and responses to readers. At one point he had to defend himself against early animal rights activists who objected his promotion of the "wearing of dead animals" in his fashion notes.

Wilde soon tired of his editorial work and often failed to turn up for work or attend meetings with the publishers. As a result, he was dropped as editor, but the magazine was unable to continue without him.`

== Bibliography ==
Clayworth, A. (1997) "The Woman's World: Oscar Wilde as Editor" Victorian Periodicals Review, Vol. 30, No. 2 (Summer, 1997), pp. 84–101. Johns Hopkins University Press on behalf of the Research Society for Victorian Periodicals
