= New Woman =

First-wave feminist ideal

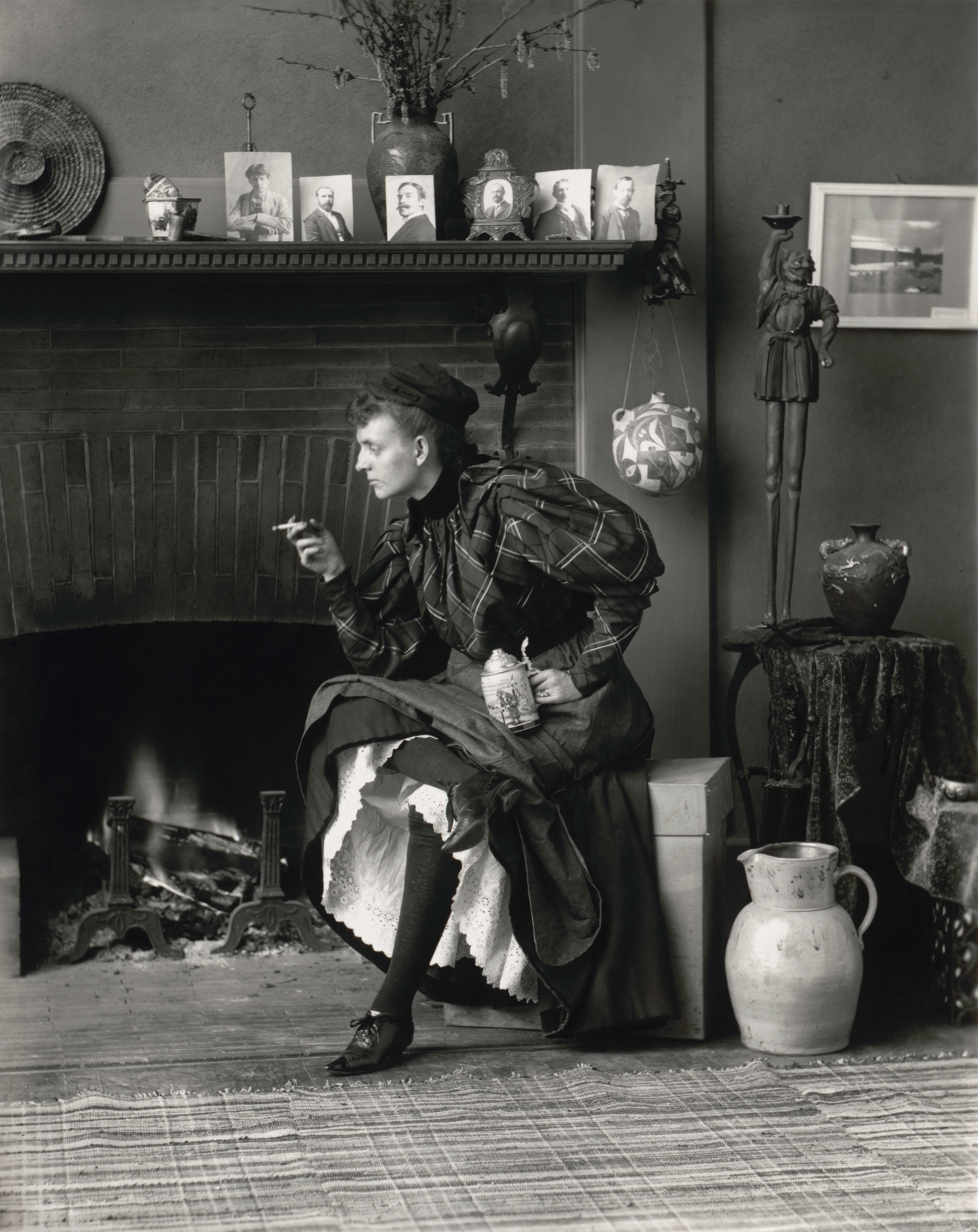
Frances Benjamin Johnston's Self-Portrait (as "New Woman"), 1896

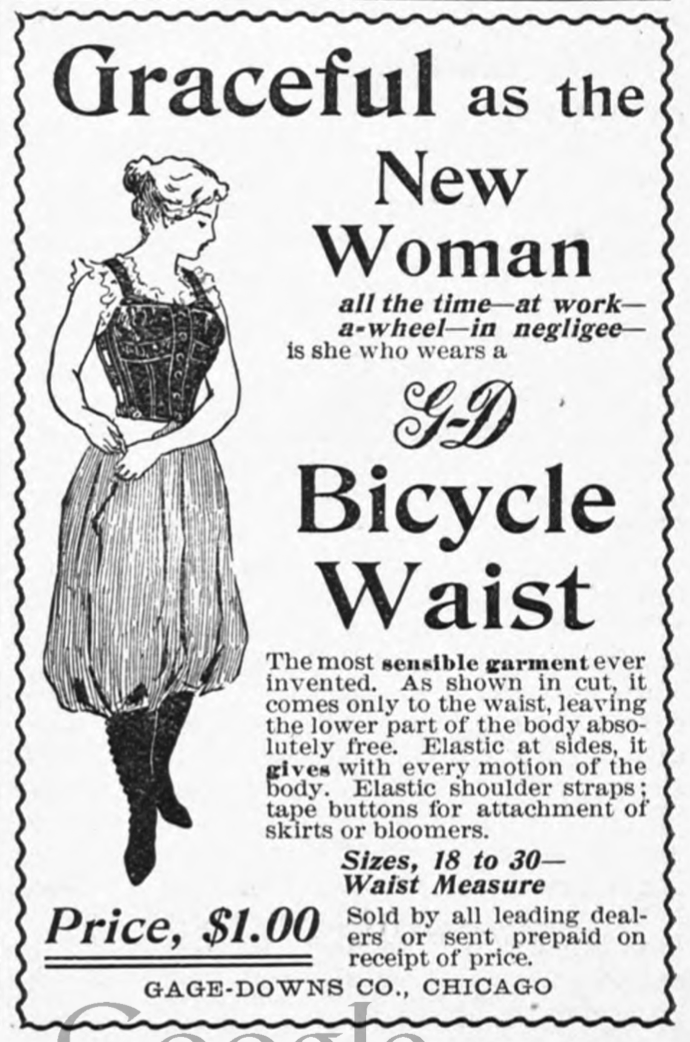
An undergarment called a bicycle waist is advertised as "graceful as the New Woman". 1896.

The New Woman was a feminist ideal that emerged in the late 19th century and had a profound influence well into the 20th century. In 1894, writer Sarah Grand (1854–1943) used the term "new woman" in an influential article to refer to independent women seeking radical change. In response the English writer Ouida (Maria Louisa Ramé) used the term as the title of a follow-up article. The term was further popularized by British-American writer Henry James, who used it to describe the growth in the number of feminist, educated, independent career women in Europe and the United States. The New Woman pushed the limits set by a male-dominated society. Independence was not simply a matter of the mind; it also involved physical changes in activity and dress, as activities such as bicycling expanded women's ability to engage with a broader, more active world.

== Changing social roles ==
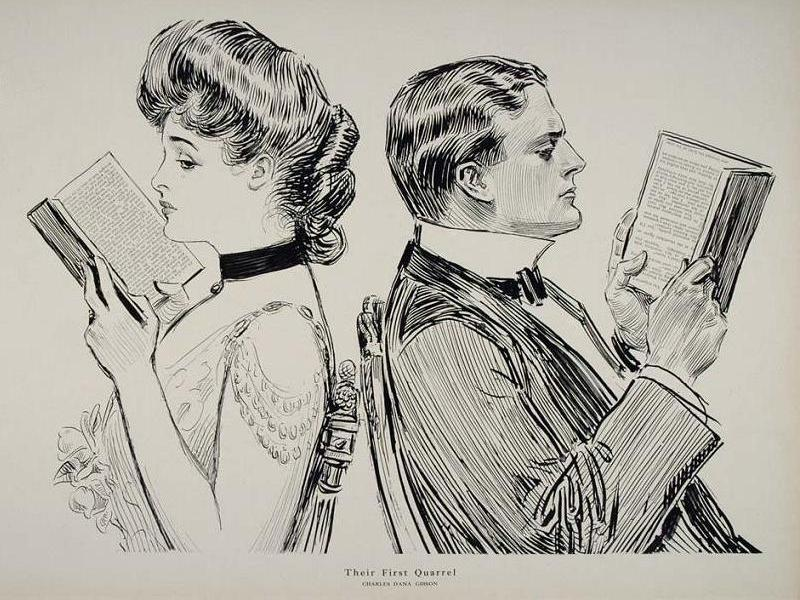
Their First Quarrel (1914), an illustration by Charles Dana Gibson. The Gibson Girl was a glamorous version of the New Woman, shown here. In the image, she keeps her back turned to her suitor as they both pretend to read.

Writer Henry James was among the authors who popularized the term "New Woman," a figure who was represented in the heroines of his novels—among them the title character of the novella Daisy Miller (serialized 1878) and Isabel Archer in Portrait of a Lady (serialized 1880–81). According to historian Ruth Bordin, the term New Woman was:

intended by [James] to characterize American expatriates living in Europe: women of affluence and sensitivity, who despite or perhaps because of their wealth exhibited an independent spirit and were accustomed to acting on their own. The term New Woman always referred to women who exercised control over their own lives be it personal, social, or economic.

Peggy Meyer Sherry notes in her article: "Telling Her Story: British Women of Letters of the Victorian Era": "[It was] Sarah Grand who invented the "New Woman," saw society as her laboratory and her novels as case studies."

The "New Woman" was also a nickname given to Ella Hepworth Dixon, the English author of the novel The Story of a Modern Woman.

=== Postsecondary and professional education ===
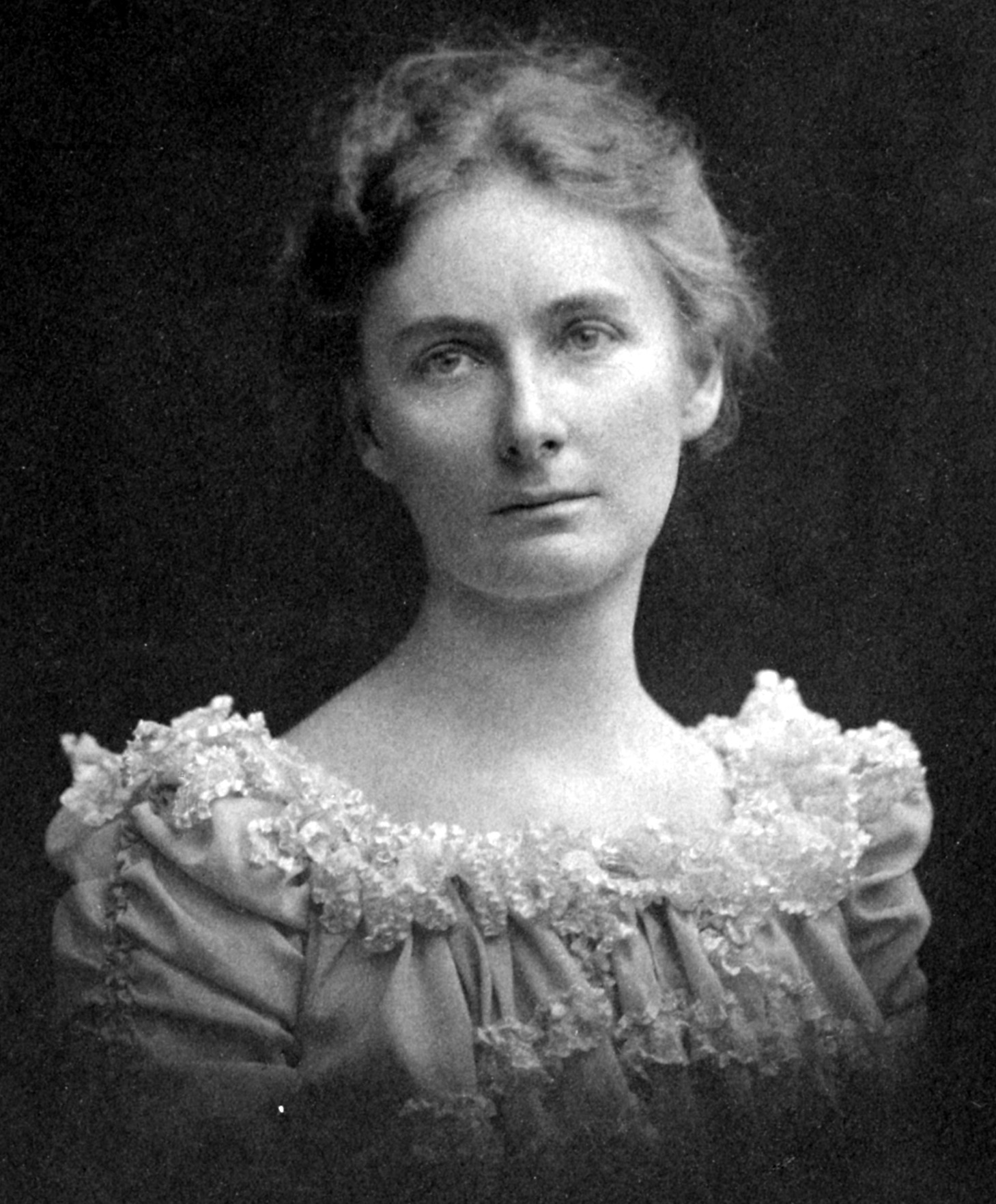
Geologist Florence Bascom was typical of the New Woman. She was the first woman to earn a Ph.D. from Johns Hopkins University (1893) and, in 1894, the first woman elected to the Geological Society of America.

Although the New Woman was becoming a more active participant in life as a member of society and the workforce, she was most often depicted exerting her autonomy in the domestic and private spheres in literature, theatre, and other artistic representations. The 19th-century suffragette movement to gain women's democratic rights was the most significant influence on the New Woman. Education and employment opportunities for women were increasing as western countries became more urban and industrialized. The "pink-collar" workforce gave women a foothold in the business and institutional sphere. In 1870, women in the professions comprised only 6.4 percent of the United States' non-agricultural workforce; by 1910, that figure had risen to 10 percent, then to 13.3 percent in 1920.

More women were winning the right to attend university or college. Some were obtaining a professional education and becoming lawyers, doctors, journalists, and professors, often at prestigious all-female colleges such as the Seven Sisters schools: Barnard, Bryn Mawr, Mount Holyoke, Radcliffe, Smith, Vassar, and Wellesley. The New Woman in the United States was participating in post-secondary education in larger numbers by the turn of the 20th century.

=== Sexuality and social expectations ===
Autonomy was a radical goal for women at the end of the 19th century. It was historically a truism that women were always legally and economically dependent on their husbands, male relatives, or social and charitable institutions. The emergence of education and career opportunities for women in the late 19th century, as well as new legal rights to property (although not yet the vote), meant that they stepped into a new position of freedom and choice when it came to marital and sexual partners. The New Woman placed great importance on her sexual autonomy, but that was difficult to put into practice as society still voiced loud disapproval of any sign of female licentiousness. For women in the Victorian era, any sexual activity outside of marriage was judged to be immoral. Divorce law changes during the late 19th century gave rise to a New Woman who could survive a divorce with her economic independence intact, and an increasing number of divorced women remarried. Maintaining social respectability while exercising legal rights still judged to be immoral by many was a challenge for the New Woman:

Mary Heaton Vorse put her compromise this way: "I am trying for nothing so hard in my own personal life as how not to be respectable when married."

It was clear in the novels of Henry James that however free his heroines felt to exercise their intellectual and sexual autonomy, they ultimately paid a price for their choices.

Some admirers of the New Woman trend found freedom to engage in lesbian relationships through their networking in women's groups. It has been said that for some of them, "loving other women became a way to escape what they saw as the probabilities of male domination inherent in a heterosexual relationship". For others, it may have been the case that economic independence meant that they were not answerable to a guardian for their sexual or other relationship choices, and they exercised that new freedom.

=== Class differences ===
The New Woman was a result of the growing respectability of postsecondary education and employment for women who belonged to the privileged upper classes of society. University education itself was still a badge of affluence for men at the turn of the 20th century, and fewer than 10 percent of people in the United States had a post-secondary education during the era.

The women entering universities generally belonged to the white middle class. Consequentially, the working class, people of color, and immigrants were often left behind in the race to achieve this new feminist model. Woman writers belonging to these marginalized communities often critiqued the way in which their newfound freedom regarding their gender came at the expense of their race, ethnicity, or class. Although they acknowledged and respected the independence of the New Woman, they could not ignore the issue that the standards for a New Woman of the Progressive Era could, for the most part, only be attained by white middle-class women.

=== Cycling ===
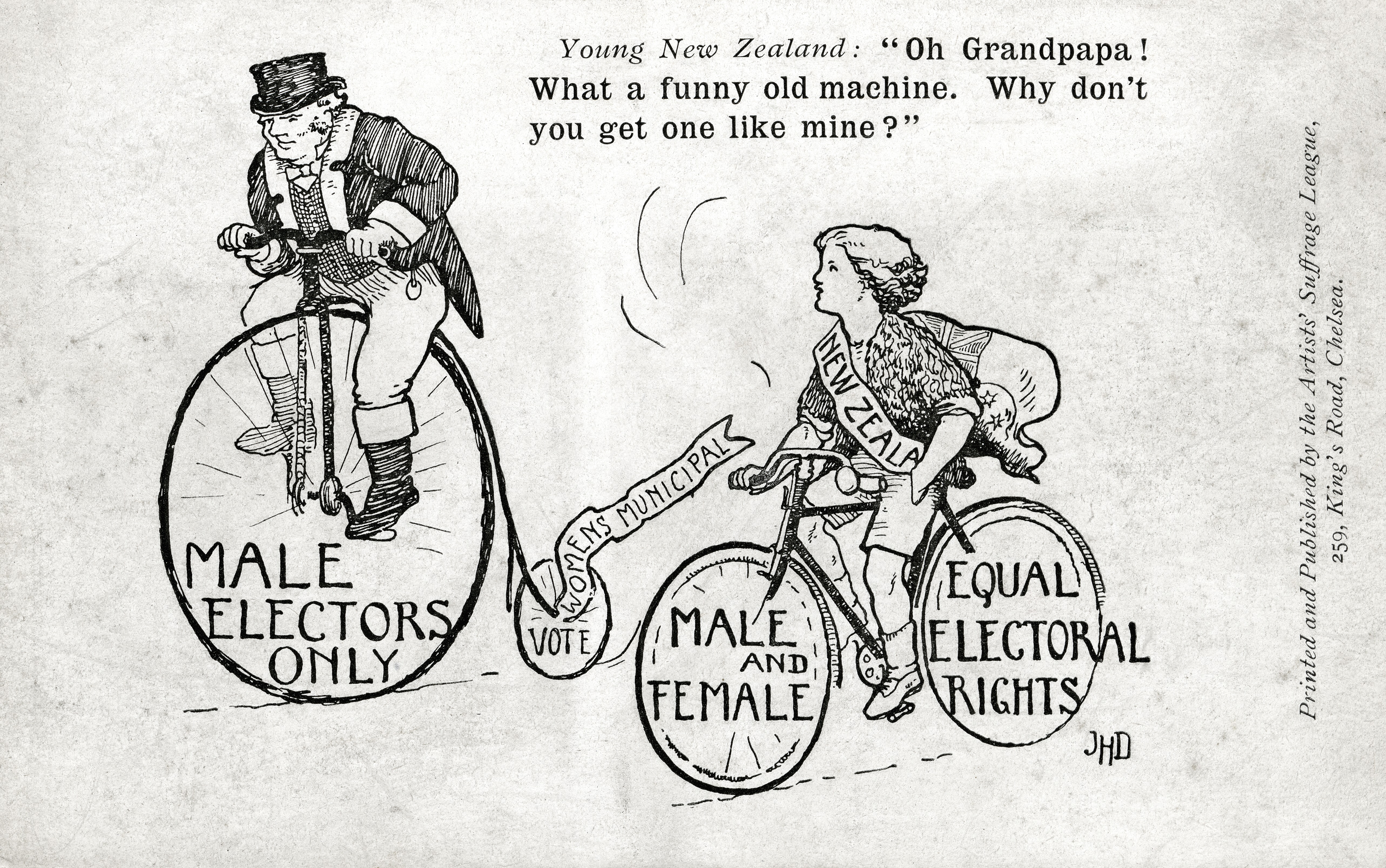
Political postcard, depicting the New Woman on her modern safety bicycle championing equal voting for men and women

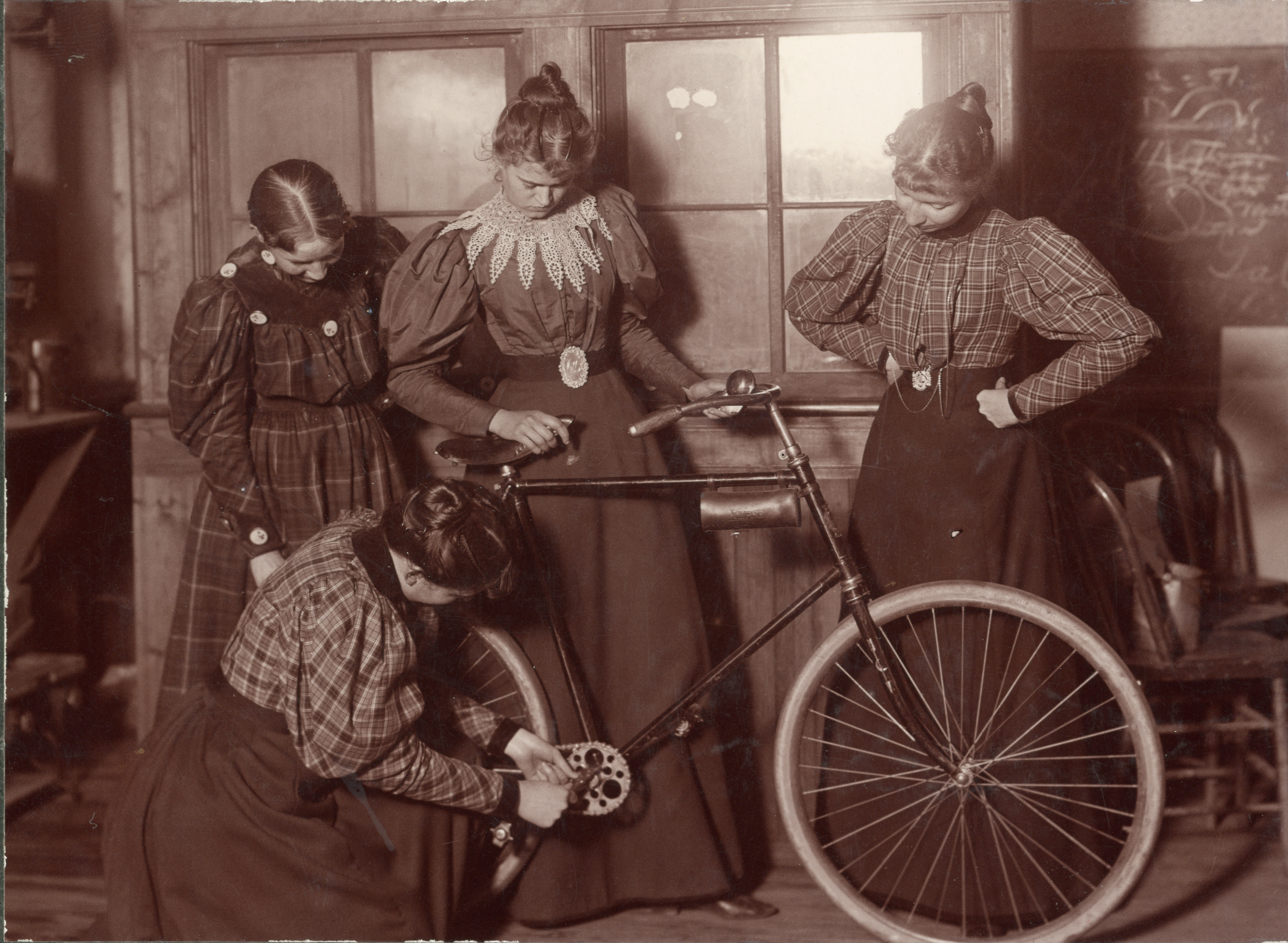
Women repairing bicycle, c. 1895

The bicycle had a significant impact on the lives of women in a variety of areas, not least in the area of Victorian dress reform, also known as the "rational dress movement". The greatest impact it had on the societal role of women occurred in the 1890s during the bicycle craze that swept American and European society. The bicycle gave women a greater amount of social mobility. The feminist Annie Londonderry accomplished her around-the-globe bicycle trip during this decade, becoming the first woman to do so. Elizabeth Robins Pennell, who started her writing career with a biography of Mary Wollstonecraft, pioneered bicycle touring with her travelogues around England and Europe in the late nineteenth century. Due to the price and the various payment plans offered by American bicycle companies, the bicycle was affordable to the majority of people. However, the bicycle impacted upper and middle class white women the most. This transformed their role in society from remaining in the private or domestic sphere as caregivers, wives, and mothers to one of greater public appearance and involvement in the community.

== Literature ==
Literary discussions of the expanding potential for women in English society date back at least to Maria Edgeworth's Belinda (1801) and Elizabeth Barrett's Aurora Leigh (1856), which explored a woman's plight between conventional marriage and the radical possibility that a woman could become an independent artist. In drama, the late nineteenth century saw such "New Woman" plays as Henrik Ibsen's A Doll's House (1879) and Hedda Gabler (1890), Henry Arthur Jones's play The Case of Rebellious Susan (1894) and George Bernard Shaw's controversial Mrs. Warren's Profession (1893) and Candida (1898). According to a joke by Max Beerbohm (1872–1956), "The New Woman sprang fully armed from Ibsen's brain" (an allusion to the birth of Athena).

Bram Stoker's Dracula makes prominent mention of the New Woman in its pages, with its two main female characters discussing the changing roles of women and the New Woman in particular. Lucy Westenra laments she can not marry several men at once, after she has been proposed to by three different men. Her friend, Mina, later writes in her diary that the New Woman would do the proposing herself. Feminist analyses of Dracula regard male anxiety about the Woman Question and female sexuality as central to the book.

The term was used by writer Charles Reade in his novel A Woman Hater, originally published serially in Blackwood's Magazine and in three volumes in 1877. Of particular interest in the context are Chapters XIV and XV in volume two, which made the case for the equal treatment of women.

In fiction, New Woman writers included Olive Schreiner, Annie Sophie Cory (Victoria Cross), Sarah Grand, Mona Caird, George Egerton, Ella D'Arcy and Ella Hepworth Dixon. Some examples of New Woman literature are Victoria Cross's Anna Lombard (1901), Dixon's The Story of a Modern Woman and H. G. Wells's Ann Veronica (1909). Kate Chopin's The Awakening (1899) also deserves mention, especially within the context of narratives derived from Flaubert's Madame Bovary (1856), both of which chronicle a woman's doomed search for independence and self-realization through sexual experimentation.

The emergence of the fashion-oriented and party-going flapper in the 1920s marked the end of the New Woman era.

== Art ==
Charles Dana Gibson, The Reason Dinner Was Late, 1912, Photographs and Prints Division, Library of Congress

By the late 19th century, art schools and academies had begun to offer more opportunities for artistic instruction to women. The Union of Women Painters & Sculptors, founded in 1881, supported women artists and offered exhibition opportunities. Women artists became "increasingly vocal and confident" in promoting women's work, and thus became part of the emerging image of the educated, modern and freer "New Woman".

In the late 19th century, Charles Dana Gibson depicted the "New Woman" in his piece, The Reason Dinner was Late, which shows a woman painting a policeman.

Artists "played crucial roles in representing the New Woman, both by drawing images of the icon and exemplifying this emerging type through their own lives". In the late 19th and early 20th centuries about 88% of the subscribers of 11,000 magazines and periodicals were women. As women entered the artist community, publishers hired women to create illustrations that depicted the world through a woman's perspective. Successful illustrators included Jennie Augusta Brownscombe, Jessie Wilcox Smith, Rose O'Neill, Elizabeth Shippen Green, and Violet Oakley.

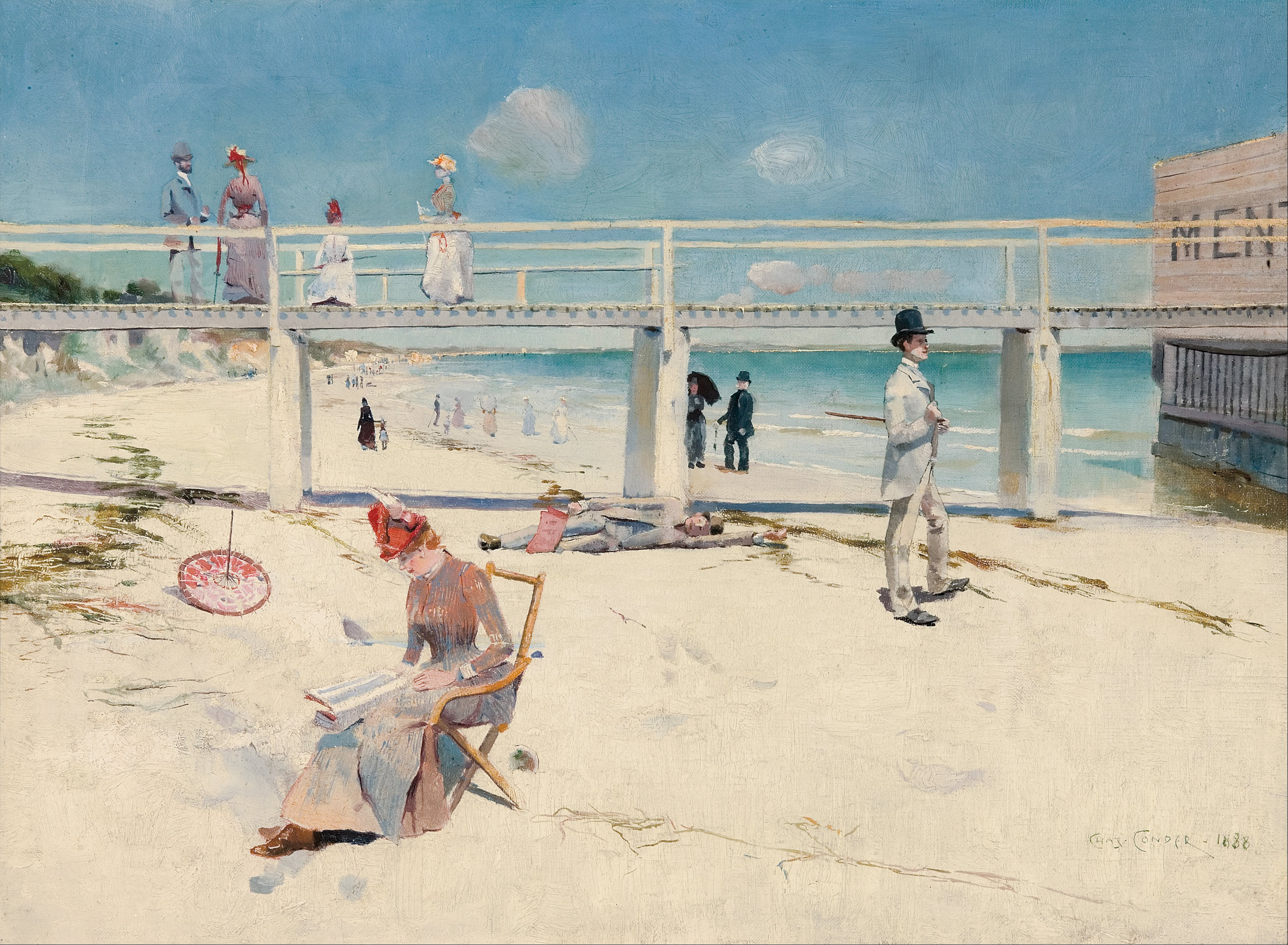
Charles Conder's 1888 painting A holiday at Mentone shows a woman reading The Bulletin, known for its radical and masculinist politics. Nearby is a gender-segregated bathhouse.

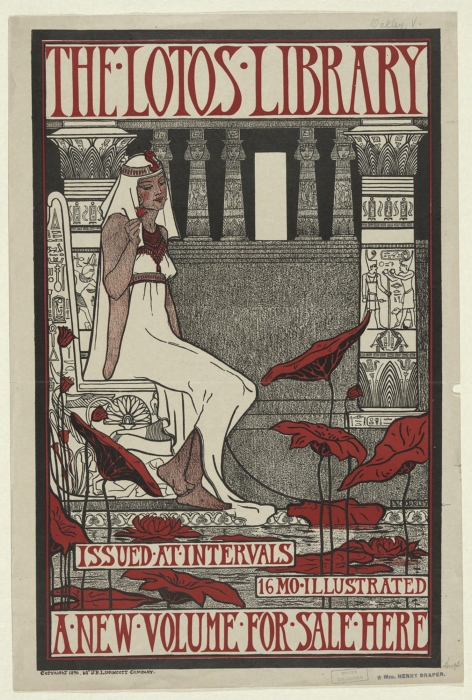
Violet Oakley, lithograph for The Lotos Library (1896)

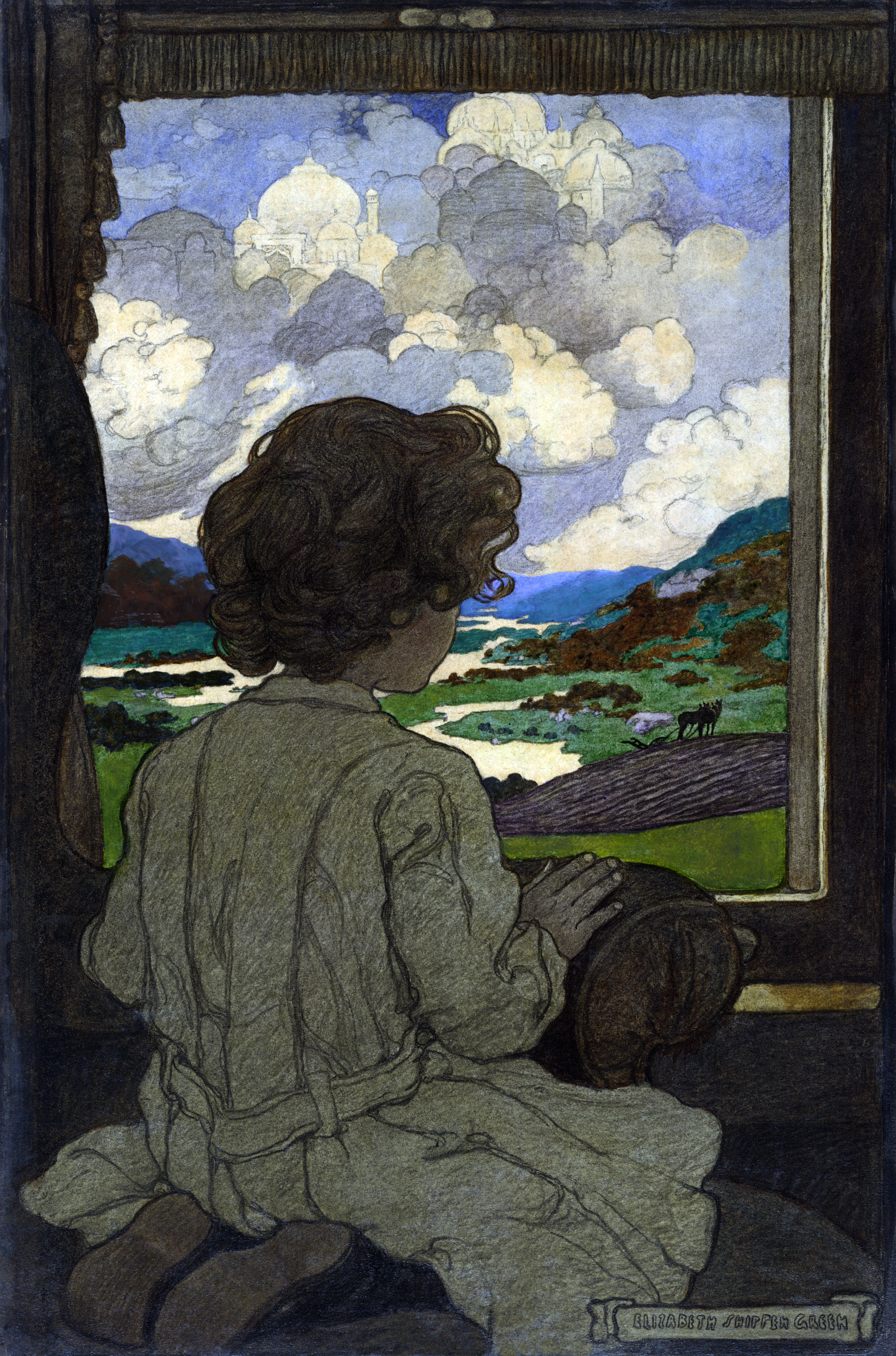
Elizabeth Shippen Green, The Journey, illustration for Josephine Preston Peabody's "The Little Past", which relates experiences of childhood from a child's perspective.

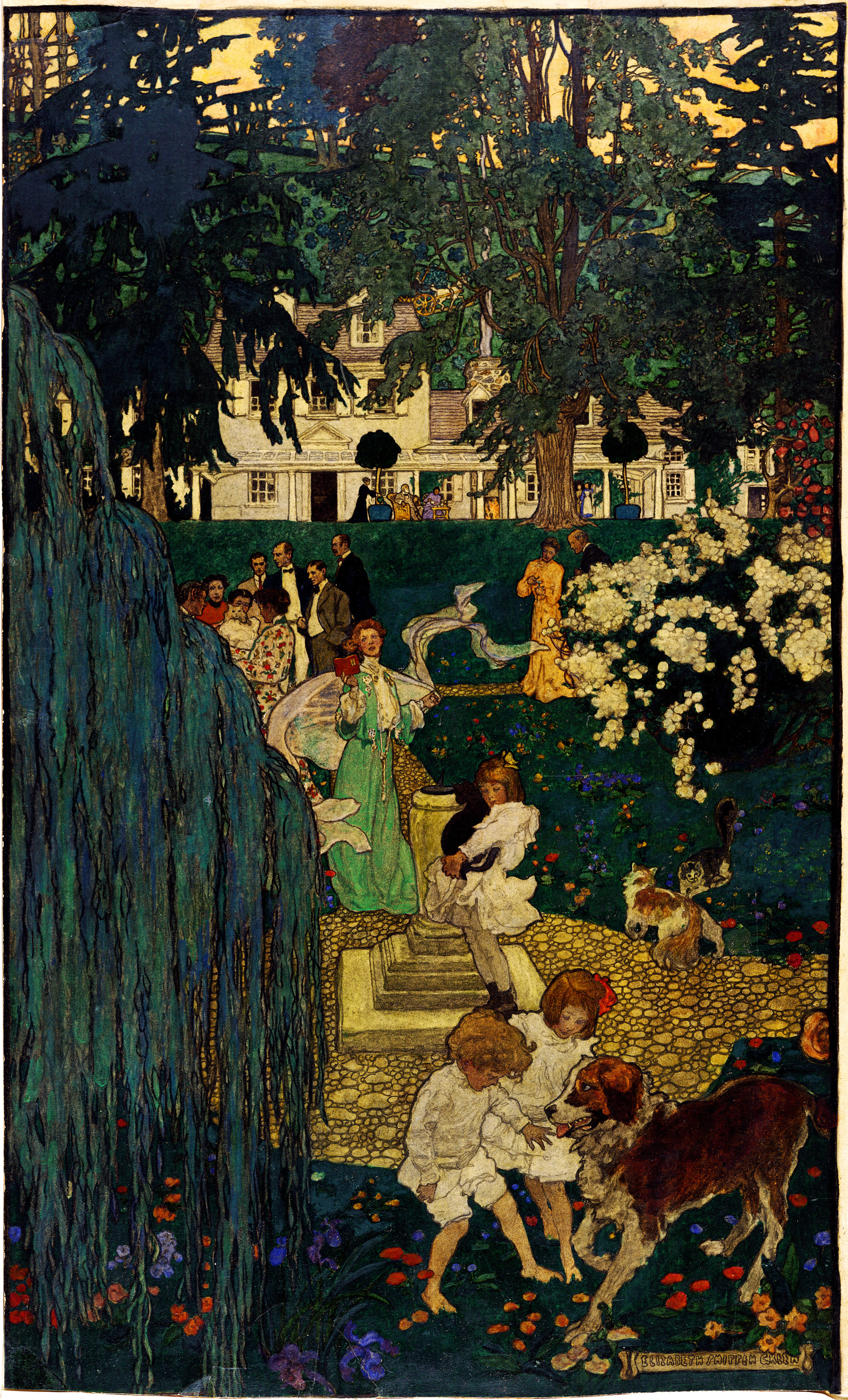
Elizabeth Shippen Green, Life was made for love and cheer (1904), illustration depicting Green, Jessie Willcox Smith, Violet Oakley and other friends.

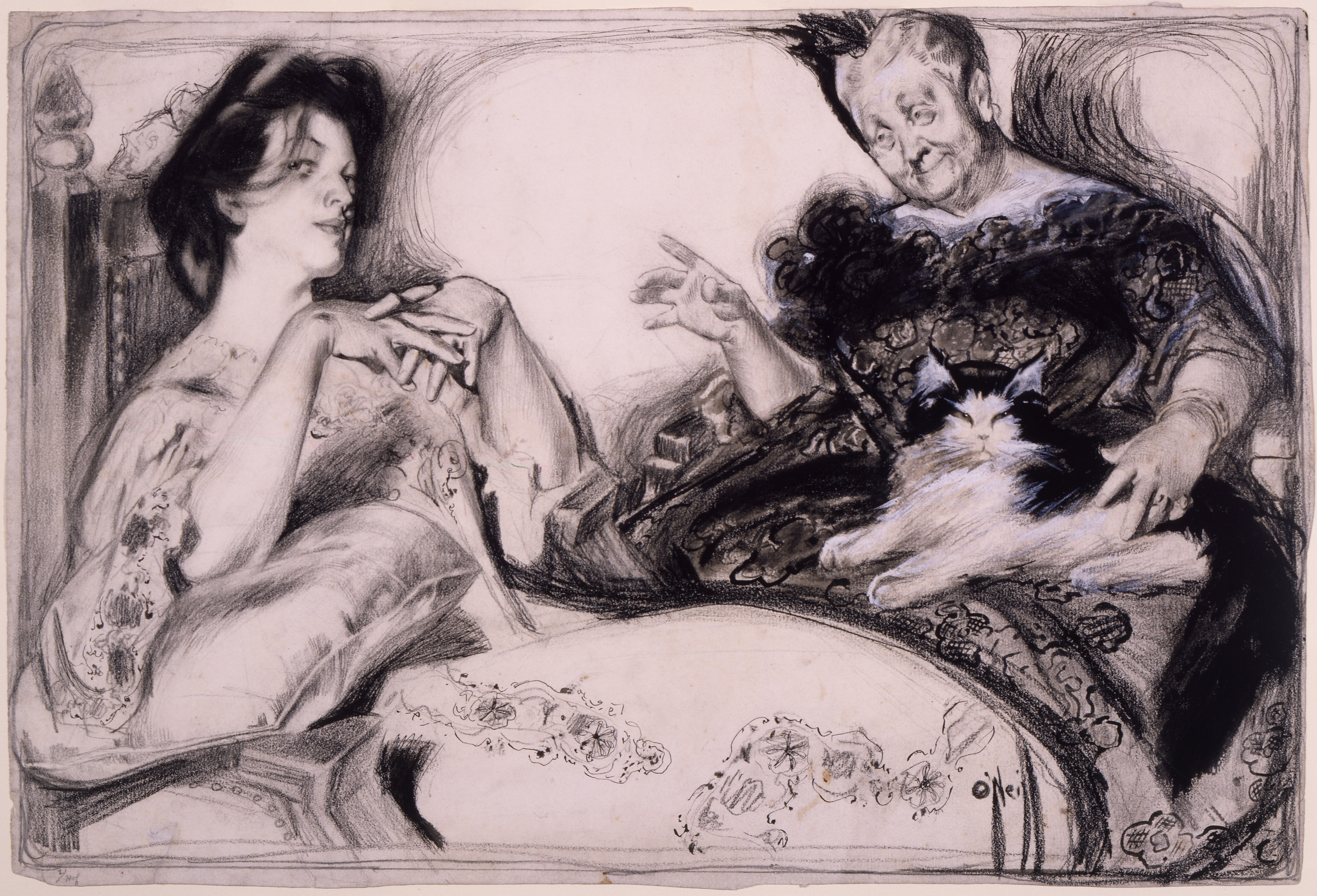
Rose O'Neill, "Signs", a cartoon for Puck, 1904.
Ethel: "He acts this way. He gazes at me tenderly, is buoyant when I am near him, pines when I neglect him. Now, what does that signify?"
Her mother: "That he's a mighty good actor, Ethel."

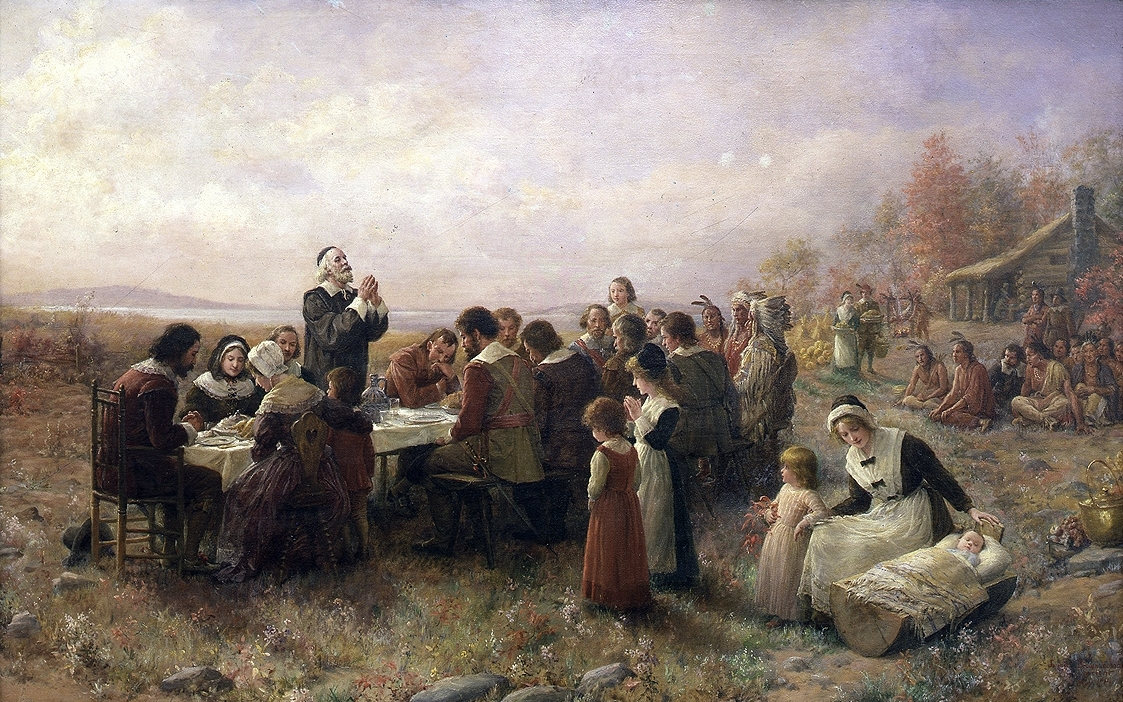
Jennie Augusta Brownscombe, The First Thanksgiving at Plymouth, 1914, Pilgrim Hall Museum, Plymouth, Massachusetts

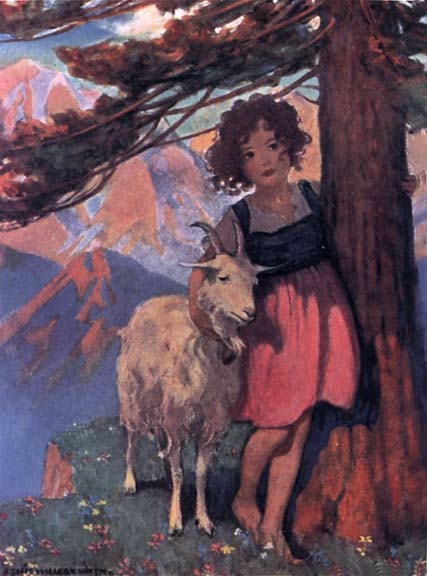
Jessie Wilcox Smith, cover of Heidi, 1922

== Commentary ==
The new woman, in the sense of the best woman, the flower of all the womanhood of past ages, has come to stay — if civilization is to endure. The sufferings of the past have but strengthened her, maternity has deepened her, education is broadening her — and she now knows that she must perfect herself if she would perfect the race, and leave her imprint upon immortality, through her offspring or her works.

— Winnifred Harper Cooley: The New Womanhood (New York, 1904) 31f.

I hate that phrase "New Woman." Of all the tawdry, run-to-heel phrases that strikes me the most disagreeably. When you mean, by the term, the women who believe in and ask for the right to advance in education, the arts, and professions with their fellow-men, you are speaking of a phase in civilisation which has come gradually and naturally, and is here to stay. There is nothing new or abnormal in such a woman. But when you confound her with the extremists who wantonly disown the obligations and offices with which nature has honored them, you do the earnest, progressive women great wrong.

— Emma Wolf, The Joy of Life (1896).

== Opposition ==
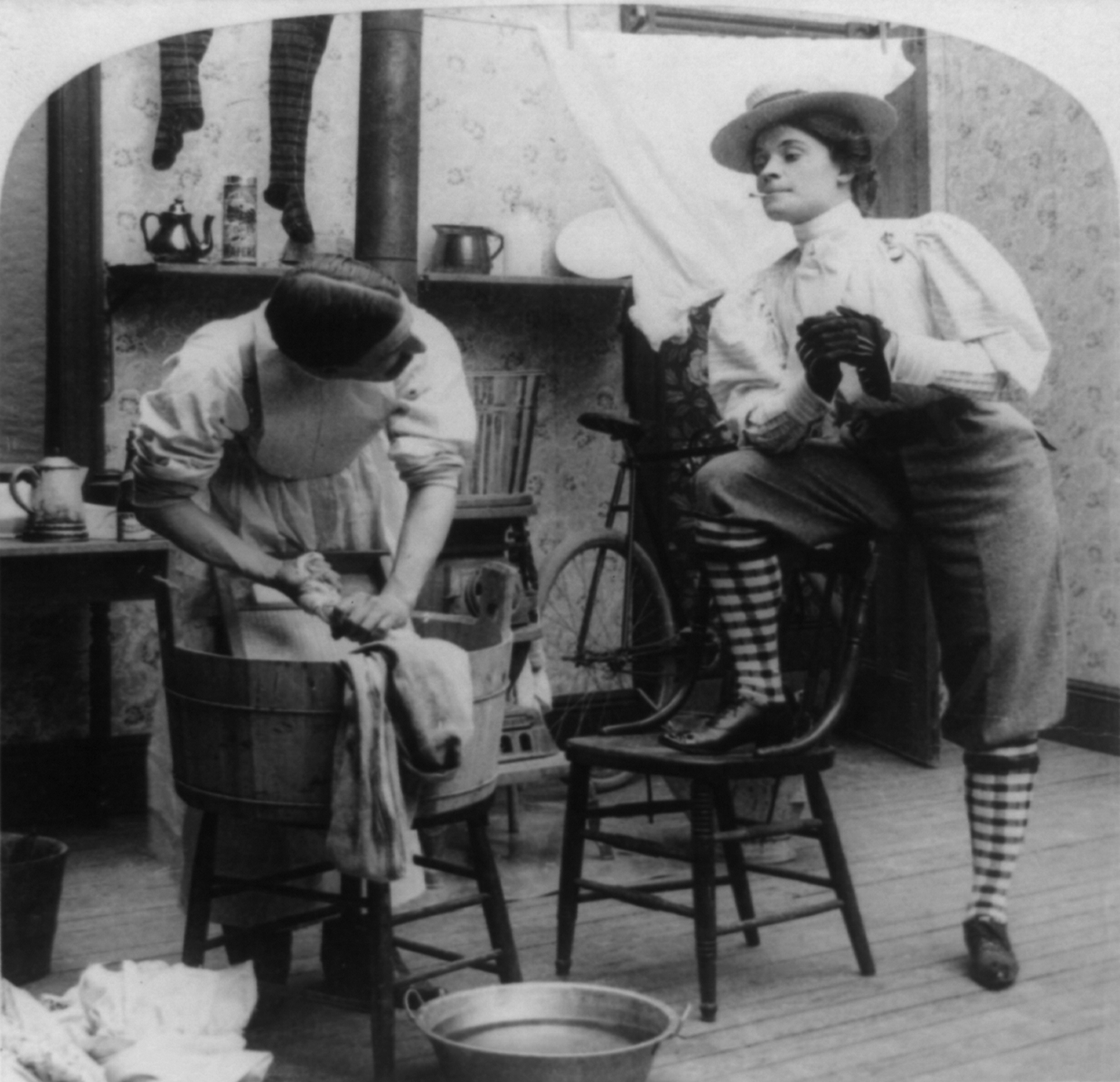
A satirical photo from 1901, with the caption "New Woman—Wash Day". Shown is a woman wearing knickerbockers and knee socks (traditional male attire) and smoking a cigarette, supervising as a man (who appears to be wearing a dress and an apron) does the laundry with a tub and washboard.

In the early 1890s, daughters of middle class Catholics expressed a desire to attend institution of higher education. Catholic leaders expressed their concern in studying at these "Protestant" schools, as the Church described it, might threaten the women's Catholic faith. The Church also viewed the New Woman as a threat to traditional womanhood and the social order. The Church cited past accomplished Catholic women, including saints, to critique the New Woman. By citing those women, the Church also argued that it was the Church, not the New Woman movement, that offered women the best opportunities. Others also critiqued the New Woman for her implied sexual freedom and for her desire to participate in matters that are best left to men's judgment. As Cummings writes, the New Woman was accused of being "essentially uncatholic and anti-catholic".

== Other countries ==
=== China ===
The New Woman of China began to emerge off of the pages of Chinese literature beginning mostly in the 1920s. However, ideas surrounding feminism, gender equality, and modernization began in China long before the 1920s New Woman emerged from its context. The New Woman of China and the movement itself went through various incarnations, changing with the social and political landscape it emerged from.

==== Fall of the Qing (1911) to pre-May Fourth Era (pre-1920s) ====
It was during the early years of the New Culture Movement and pre-May Fourth era that the term "New Woman" first emerged in China. This term, used by Hu Shi (1891-1962) during a 1918 lecture, suggested that women were more than just "good wives and wise mothers" and instead pushed for women's freedom and individuality in the larger national framework. However, Hu Shi along with a handful of other male intellectuals, were the minority pushing for women’s involvement in society.

Influenced heavily by the New Culture movement, which emphasised condemning the “slavish Confucian tradition which was known to sacrifice the individual for conformity and force rigid notions of subservience, loyalty, and female chastity," the New Woman who emerged in the 1910s were far less progressive than their later 1920s counterparts. New Women during the early Republican period had to contend heavily with the ‘woman question’ a question regarding how to "address issues of modernity and the nation" and women's role in both. During this period, women's education was promoted, but as a tool to create women who would be equipped to “raise healthy and morally sound sons”, who would then help build a new China. So even though education was encouraged for women, it was not for their personal benefit but instead for the state and nation. Early New Women such as Hu Binxia, an early editor for The Ladies Journal, promoted in her articles the ideas of education to learn how to support a family and participate in the cult of domesticity.

However, like minded male reformers to Hu Shi, Chen Duxiu promoted a very different kind of women for China’s changing political, social, and economic landscape pre-May Fourth era. Founder of the New Youth journal, Chen Duxiu called for gender and family reforms and pushed for the emancipation of women and the dismantling of the restrictive Confucian family system. Chen, like other radical-minded male intellectuals of his time, believed “women’s equality to be the hallmark of a modern civilization” and the strength behind a nation. Thus “customs of concubinage, foot binding, widow chastity, and female seclusion”, from these male intellectual's view points, needed to be eliminated to allow women to freely participate in the nation's rebuilding.

While Chinese men at this time backed the idea of the dismantling the Confucian system, they did not do so solely for women to be freed from it. Chinese male intellectuals backed women's emancipation from the system, but not their emancipation as individuals. The hope was that women could be freed from Confucianism's confines and then mobilized for the cause of nationalism. This can be seen by such reformers as Liang Qichao who believed that the "future strength of the nation was the ultimate goal, and that women's rights were only a means" to meet that goal, not the end of it.

Furthermore, the New Women of China during this time drew heavily on American and European literature, feminist movements, and female missionaries along with Japanese feminists and New Women too. Both Chinese men and women looked to the United States, which was believed to be the most advanced in regards to women's rights, as a source of inspiration. Education and economic opportunities, such as those that Chinese male intellectuals of the time promoted for women, were considered to be the hallmark of a free and independent women. These ideas of economic independence and educational opportunities were promoted by both the male and female intellectuals of the time, but both promoted them for different reasons as noted above.

==== Post-May Fourth Era (1920s) to the early 1930s ====
Changes to the New Woman and their ideals began after the May Fourth Movement. While the movement emerged from the context of World War I (Treaty of Versailles), its new ideas regarding the economy, education, politics, and gender roles had a profound effect on the New Women in China and the direction of the movement. Where previous New Women during the early twentieth century had been influenced by women in the United States, Europe, and Japan, the New Women of China began during the 1920s to using their own stories and ideas as their inspiration. In this, while Western literary figures and writers such as Nora in Hendrik Ibsen's A Doll's House (1879) still had massive popularity and influence, male and female writers of the time used these writings as templates but applied Chinese societal problems and themes to the storylines and characters. So while they had a connection to these original works, they featured both larger global struggles of women, such as free love relationships, and more individual problems for Chinese women, such as dealing with the Confucian family system and filial piety.

The New Women in China, both as women living in China and literary figures in books, still faced pressures in the 1920s and 1930s to "exemplify familial and national devotion" however. With that said though, not everyone shared this sentiment. For example, during the late 1910s and early 1920s, the Ladies' Journal promoted ideas of individualism and romantic love relationships and marriages instead of arranged. Other writers believed a strong Chinese nation would arise only when "education, suffrage, social freedoms, and economic independence" were granted to women. Thus, while women seemed to gain more freedom in their choice or marriage partner and the possibility of working outside of the domestic realm, the rhetoric and meaning behind these new choices for women, hidden behind modernist vocabulary, remained the same: establishing a family or devoting oneself to the nation.

An important lecture, "What Happens After Nora Leaves Home", was given at Beijing Women's Normal College in 1923 which discussed women in Chinese society and their inability to become truly independent from both the family and from their male partners. This talk given by Lu Xun, a revolutionary writer concerned with women’s issues amongst many other things, cautioned women against idealizing Western female literary figures such as Hendrik Ibsen's Nora in A Doll's House (1879) . Lu Xun noted that while her actions were bold, Nora did not have any means to support herself once she left home, leaving her with limited options of survival. Lu Xun was not against women seeking independence, he was however, pointing out the limited access women had to economic self-sufficiency and social welfare.

==== Nora's influence on early to mid twentieth century Chinese literature ====
Regardless of Lu Xun's warning, Western literary figures, like Nora in A Doll's House (1879), came to be seen as great examples of New Women to female and male readers of the time. Nora, the heroine of A Doll's House, who leaves her patriarchal marriage and ventures out into the world alone, was used as an ideal archetype by female and male Chinese writers in their own stories and essays.

When looking at female Chinese writers of the time, Ding Ling and Chen Xuezhao were both heavily influenced by the New Women and their message. Chen Xuezhao, a Chinese feminist of her time, advocated for women to be liberated from the patriarchal system allowing them the ability to contribute more wholeheartedly to society. Her 1927 essay published in the New Woman magazine, noted how women wished to remain single and thus able to “pursue their own personal fulfilment and livelihood”, becoming “active participants in civic life”.

Another New Woman writer, Ding Ling, by using fiction, wrote about the lives of women, their sexuality, and the “complications they faced making a life for themselves in a modernizing society”. Influenced by her single-mother, Ding Ling presented herself as the epitome of a New Woman as she was starkly against foot-binding, chopped her hair into a short bob cut, went to male and female schools, and refused an arranged marriage. Her most influential work, Miss Sophia's Diary, inspired by Ibsen’s A Doll’s House, details a New Woman's journey with "sexual and emotional frustrations of romantic love as a 'liberated' women in a patriarchal society". Ding Ling's writing focused on criticizing the patriarchal family, the marriage system, concepts of female chastity, and the double standards women faced.

Male writers of the time too, used Ibsen's story as inspiration for their own versions to the Nora tale. For example, Hu Shi's play Zhongshen dashi (The greatest event in life; 1917), stars a Nora-influenced character whose story highlights the idea of free love relationships for both men and women, moving away from the idea of arranged, loveless marriages.

Lu Xun was another male writer of the time who created literature using these New Women characters. As mentioned above, Lu Xun gave a speech in 1923 noting how Nora had no economic means to turn to when she left home. His talk and subsequent story on the topic, demonstrated that in Chinese society, women lacked the economic funds needed to be able to survive outside of her family and husband. As Nora did not have any means to generate an income for herself once she left, and because she lacked an education, she was left with few options of survival. His story, New Year's Sacrifice (1924), while not explicitly about the New Women of China, went on to criticize the idea of monitoring women's chastity and virtue. However, his story Regret for the Past, whose female protagonist is modelled after Nora, shows his female lead leaving her family home to be with her lover, only to eventually return to her family home in the end due to a lack of economic independence. Demonstrating Lu Xun's belief that China had not created ways for women to survive outside of their family or husband's homes.

==== Characteristics of the New Woman in literature and in Chinese society in the 1920s–1930s ====
While not from the 1920s and 1930s, an incredibly early example of the archetype of the Chinese New Woman was Ida Kahn/Kang Aide/Kang Cheng (December 6, 1873 – November 9, 1931). An early New Woman in the context of the Chinese New Woman movement, Ida Kahn, born in China, was adopted by an American female missionary who took her in 1892 to the United States to receive a college education in medicine. There are a few reasons Kahn stands out as an early archetype of the eventual 1920s New Woman. The first is the education she received. Kahn received two degrees. The degree she received was in medicine, which she put to work back in China when she became a doctor in the early nineteen hundreds. The second degree Kahn received was a bachelor's degree in English literature in 1911. What is unique about this, other than the fact that she received a degree in medicine in the first place, was that this second degree was done solely out of personal interest for the topic. While later New Women were encouraged to receive an education, it was not for one's personal benefit but instead to become better wives and mothers, so this early example of a Chinese woman receiving an education out of interest is an anomaly of the time. The second is marital status. Kahn never married and instead devoted her life to the cause of medicine and healing others. Kahn remained single her whole life, breaking away from the tradition of marrying and establishing a family. Lastly, Kahn worked as a physician for the majority of her life. Kahn devoted her life to the Chinese state and its people. Kahn was later turned into a symbol of national reform by Liang Qichao who, noting the anomaly she posed as a female figure in China, morphed Kahn into a "central image of modernity".

The 1920s to 1930s New Woman in China from the page to real life shared similarities and differences both with each other and with the early New Woman, Ida Kahn. For example, Ding Ling, the female writer, exemplified the ultimate New Woman both in her visual appearance and in her ideas and stories. As noted earlier, Ding Ling's physical appearance aligned with other New Women as she "had her long, braided hair cut short", a typical style of the New Woman. Her ideas and literature also aligned with 1920s New Woman as her stories depicted female sexual desires and women's liberation from the patriarchal family.

New Women, according to Barbara Molony, emerged in the late 1920s, out of the New Culture Movement and were viewed as the "educated, patriotic embodiment of a new gender order working to overcome the oppressions of the Confucian family system and traditional society". New Women were usually female students who in appearance wore eyeglasses, had short bobbed hair, and unbound feet, and in practice usually lived on their own, had open, casual relationships, and aimed to be economically independent from their family.

However, the Modern Girl, who also emerged in the late 1920s and early 1930s, came to signify "commodified, glamorous, and individualist women". Each of these two types of women in China came to exemplify very different styles and beliefs. The New Woman both in literature and in real life were "associated with leftist and progressive intellectuals, equated with positive aspects of modernity" and seen as educated, political and nationalistic in her view points. The New Woman was all things positive in relation to modernity and "symbolized the vision of a future strong nation" but with aspects of modernity and revolution. So while the New Woman expressed the positive changes that came with modernity, the Modern Girl "expressed men's disillusionment with modernity and their fears of female subjectivity". While neither of these two women were necessarily beloved by males wishing to keep the status quo, the New Woman was more accepted as she was believed by men, even though she advocated for free love and economic independence, to still uphold family and national values.

==== Suicide and the Chinese New Woman ====
Even with these apparent newfound freedoms (ability to work outside the domestic domain, economic stability, and choice in marriage partners), some New Women still felt constricted by the system and thus, unheard. To make their opinions about this system heard, some New Women followed the old Confucian tradition of female suicide as a means to get their message across to the general populace.

According to Margery Wolf, women's suicide in China was less about “Why?” and more about “Who? Who drove her to this? Who is responsible?”. This can be seen with the case of Xi Shangzhen, an office employee who in 1922 committed suicide for reasons that are still contested. Xi was an unmarried office employee who, disgruntled at her boss hung herself in her place of work. There are two possible reasons for her decision that are known. The first is that her boss lost her money on the stock market causing her to be put in a hard financial situation. The second reason, which Bryna Goodman believes to be most likely was that Xi's boss, whom she was having an affair with, asked her to be his concubine.

As Margery Wolf points out, “suicide was considered a proper response for women whose honour had been tampered with”. This also relates to virtue, chastity, or rumours about either. In this case, Xi who was an educated woman working a job, felt her virtue had been infringed upon and insulted, and thus made a bold decision to make her case of insult known to the general public. The death of Xi was shocking as it showed a conflict between the modern and Confucian value systems. As noted by Barbara Molony, Xi embodied the typical New Woman as she was an "educated, unmarried woman and supporting herself with an independent career". Xi was viewed as a New Woman who through her job, was able to obtain economic independence but through her actions of suicide, demonstrated a very long tradition in Chinese history of female suicide for the sake of virtue.

=== Germany ===
After women gained the right to vote and be elected in the wake of World War I in Germany, the Neue Frau became a trope in German popular culture, representing new discourses about sexuality, reproduction and urban mass society. This German New Woman was portrayed by authors such as Elsa Herrmann (So ist die neue Frau, 1929) and Irmgard Keun (Das kunstseidene Mädchen, 1932, translated as The Artificial Silk Girl, 1933). These urbane, sexually liberated working women wore androgynous clothes, cut their hair short, and were widely seen as apolitical. The New Women in Germany was closely connected to the lesbian subculture in Weimar Republic.

=== Korea ===
In Korea in the 1920s, the New Woman's Movement arose among educated Korean women who protested the Confucian patriarchal tradition. During a period of Japanese imperialism, Christianity was seen as an impetus for Korean nationalism and had been involved in events such as the March 1st Movement of 1919 for independence. Hence, in contrast to many Western contexts, Christianity informed the ideals of Western feminism and women's education, especially through the Ewha Womans University. The New Woman's Movement is often seen to be connected with the Korean magazine New Women (Korean: 신여자; Hanja: 新女者; MR: Sin yŏja), founded in 1920 by Kim Iryŏp, which included other key figures such as Na Hye-sŏk.

Originally, the term ‘New Woman’ was associated with education, enlightenment, and social consciousness, while the term ‘Modern Girl’ carried connotations of frivolity and excess. While these terms continue to carry some of these original meanings, they eventually came to be used interchangeably. New Women included female students and workers, and as women started working, they formed a new urban working class, endowing them with economic power, the ability to participate in modern consumerism, independence from their families, and the opportunity to engage in more social contact with men. While these changes led to greater female freedom, Modern Girls and New Women drew severe criticism from male intellectuals who argued that these modern women were consumed with Western capitalism, were consumer-oriented and hypersensitive to trends and fads, morally depraved, and sexually promiscuous. However, more moderate authors like Yu Kwang-Yol and Song So-In described the Modern Girl as an embodiment of the transition from old traditions to new practices and recognized that, while the trend could focus on material consumption, New Women and Modern Girls also strove to cultivate a moral vision and higher knowledge. Nonetheless, the majority of representations of New Women and Modern Girls in mass media reduced them to caricatures with short hair, make-up, and Western clothing, while ignoring their strides in knowledge, skill, and identity.

According to a study by Na Kyong-Hui, more than 230 editorials on the “women question” appeared in the Choson Ilbo and the Tonga Ilbo, two of the most widely circulated newspapers during the colonial period, from 1920-1940. One of the main characteristics of Modern Girls criticized in these newspapers was New Women’s trend towards consumerism. Who who, unable to prioritize necessary items and exercise self-control in their shopping, wore expensive clothing beyond their means, perhaps to the detriment to their families were ridiculed. Modern Girls were also seem as being hypersensitivity to fashion trends, and there was a shift in the power dynamic between husbands and wives, with men now groveling to meet their wives’ demands. However, this condemnation of consumerism went beyond gender: it was rooted in Korea’s relationship with Japan. Consuming Japanese goods was believed to inadvertently contribute to Korea’s colonial subordination to Japan while framing Japanese oppressors as progressive and Korea as a remote, pre-industrial land. Authors like Yu Kwang-Yeoul argued that the Korean masses were so “blinded by the glittering, seductive products” of Japan that they failed to recognize Japan’s “assault on Korea’s economy.” Criticisms of female consumerism also reveal men’s underlying fear of losing their status and social position, for women’s economic involvement challenged traditional gender roles and centuries of Confucian practice.

This exploration of changing gender roles was further debated in cartoons, particularly around the departure from the hyeonmo yangcheo (wise mother and good wife) rhetoric and women’s increased participation in public life. It was believed that as women became educated and entered the workforce, they also became masculinized while men became feminized, leading to ambiguity between the sexes. Women's bobbed hair and short skirts also represent another form of rebellion against cultural norms and traditional gender roles. Despite male opposition to the new fashion styles, modern women held their own ideas of what was attractive, comfortable, and functional, particularly in the work setting, and defined their beauty, sexuality, and identity for themselves. It was also thought that women could not simultaneously be New Women and good mothers and wives.

The final topic frequently represented in the Modern Girl debate was the issue of female sexuality. In contrast to women in the Joseon dynasty who covered their heads and could not go outside without a male chaperone, changes in fashion and ideology led to more exposed female bodies. New Women argued that the new trends were stylish and comfortable, but male intellectuals criticized Modern Girls for being unvirtuous and bringing inappropriate attention to their sexuality. Furthermore, during the Joseon dynasty, men were the pursuers. However, New Women were shown to be proactive and aggressive in their quest for a husband.

New Women and Modern Girls were depicted in art in many different ways. Kim Eun-Ho’s The Gaze features a beautiful woman standing in a field of wildflowers under a weeping willow. She holds a bouquet in her hands and wears Western clothing including a short skirt, long jacket, high heels, and shawl around her shoulders. Kim Eun-Ho’s representation of the New Woman using warm, soft colors and sloping lines portrays her in a romantic light, where she is the passive female being caught unexpectedly in a private moment. This strongly contrasts Na Hye-Seok’s representation of herself in Self-Portrait, which conveys her identity as an artist, a New Woman, and an intellectual. Her facial features, clothing, and Cubism-inspired painting style are also distinctly Western, and her expression is mask-like and masculine. The dark colors and solid representation of her body challenge the stereotypical representation of women in Korean art, for instead of being delicate and submissive, she is serious and powerful.

=== Japan ===
In the early 1900s, the Western concept of the New Woman began to circulate in Japan. The term for New Woman, Atarashii Onna, was first formally used in July 1910 during a lecture by Tokyo Imperial University professor Tsubouchi Shoyo. Atarashii Onna was used with derision by critics to denote a woman who was promiscuous, shallow, and unfilial, the opposite of Meiji Japan's ideals of ryōsai kenbo. Despite this members of Seitō, a woman's magazine which became a symbol of Japan's New Women, such as Hiratsuka Raichō and Itō Noe, proudly embraced the term. Educated women who functioned as both literary and political figures embodied the concept of Japan's New Women in the 1910s, using literary platforms such as Seitō to circulate their ideas amongst the public.

Seitō was first published in September 1911 and featured many prominent female writers, such as Hiratsuka Raichō, who herself lived an untraditional life as a woman who pursued a love affair with a young male writer. As the founder and editor of Seitō, Hiratsuka Raichō had this to say about being a new woman: "I am a New Woman. As New Women, we have always insisted that women are also human beings. It is common knowledge that we have opposed the existing morality, and have maintained that women have the right to express themselves as individuals and to be respected as individuals." Another revolutionary female writer, Yosano Akiko, wrote a poem celebrating the women's movement in Seitō's inaugural issue, entitled "The Day the Mountains Move". What made Seitō simultaneously controversial and powerful was how it rallied against Japan's existing family system based on patriarchy, instead championing romantic love and a woman's independence. Like Hiratsuka Raichō, Seitō writer Ito Noe similarly practiced the ideals she preached in writing in her own life, leaving an unsatisfactory marriage to study in Tokyo and marrying twice more. In her essay "The Path of the New Woman", published in the January 1913 issue of Seitō, Itō Noe proclaimed her commitment to pursuing the path of a New Woman and urged others to do the same despite societal backlash: "How could anyone imagine that the way of the New Woman, the way of this pioneer, be anything less than one continuous, torturous struggle?"

Seitō's transgressive content and style fueled numerous attacks. Multiple newspapers and academic circles who advocated for Japan's traditional family system attacked Hiratsuka Raichō and the other women of Seitō. People worried that the concept of the New Woman being promulgated in Seitō would disrupt the existing order and social stability.

One essential distinction between the iteration of the New Woman that emerged in Japan and that which emerged in many Western countries is that the Japanese New Woman was not directly connected to the national suffrage movement. As Japanese men were not granted universal male suffrage until 1925, women's suffrage in Japan became an issue of political leverage more than a decade later than conversations about the New Woman were occurring. By the mid-1920s, Japan’s "New Woman" had been replaced by the idea of the "Modern Girl" or Modan Gāru. While separate entities, both New Women and Modern Girls reflected modernity, embodied Western influence, and were labelled by the press as too transgressive.

=== Soviet Union ===
The concept of the New Woman was introduced soon after the Bolsheviks came to power in Russia in 1918. Alexandra Kollontai, Nadezhda Krupskaia and Inessa Armand established the Zhenotdel in 1919, a government department devoted to establishing a new culture of female expectations. According to historian Barbara Evans Clement, the New Soviet Woman was a Superwoman who took on the burden of multiple roles: Communist citizen, full-time worker, wife, and mother. The Zhenotdel was dissolved in 1930, without having been able to resolve the layered identities expected of this ideal-type Soviet woman.

== See also ==
- Women writers in Chinese literature
- Flapper
- Gibson Girl
- History of feminism
- Individualist feminism
- Modern girl
- Rachel Verinder, heroine of the novel The Moonstone by Wilkie Collins
- Women's Suffrage and Western Women's Fashion through the early 1900s

== Sources ==
- A New Woman Reader, ed. Carolyn Christensen Nelson (Broadview Press: 2000) (ISBN 1-55111-295-7) (contains the text of Sydney Grundy's 1894 satirical comedy actually entitled The New Woman)
- Martha H. Patterson: Beyond the Gibson Girl: Reimagining the American New Woman, 1895–1915 (University of Illinois Press: 2005) (ISBN 0-252-03017-6)
- Sheila Rowbotham: A Century of Women. The History of Women in Britain and the United States (Penguin Books: 1999) (ISBN 0-14-027902-4), Chapters 1–3.
- Patterson, Martha H. The American New Woman Revisited (New Brunswick: Rutgers University Press, 2008) (ISBN 0813542960)
- Molony, Barbara; Theiss, Janet; Choi, Hyaeweol (2016). Gender in Modern East Asia. Avalon Publishing. ISBN 978-0-8133-4875-9. OCLC 947808181.
- Wolf, Margery; Witke, Roxane; Martin, Emily (1975). Women in Chinese Society. Stanford University Press. ISBN 978-0-8047-0874-6. OCLC 1529107.
- Choi, Hyaeweol (2013). New Women in Colonial Korea: A Sourcebook. Routledge. ISBN 978-0-415-51709-6.
- Wong, Aida Yuen (2012). Visualizing Beauty: Gender and Ideology in Modern East Asia. Hong Kong University Press. ISBN 978-988-8083-89-3.

== Bibliography ==
- (IT) Lambruschini, Debora. “La New Woman nella letteratura vittoriana” flower-ed (2017) ISBN 978-88-85628-15-1, ebook: ISBN 978-88-85628-14-4.
- Chien, Ying-Ying (January 1994). "Revisioning 'new women'". Women's Studies International Forum. 17 (1): 33–45. doi:10.1016/0277-5395(94)90005-1.
- Chin, Carol C. (November 2006). "Translating the New Woman: Chinese Feminists View the West, 1905–15". Gender & History. 18 (3): 490–518. doi:10.1111/j.1468-0424.2006.00453.x. S2CID 144409722.
- Feuerwerker, Yi-Tsi. "Women as Writers in the 1920's and 1930's." In Women in Chinese society, edited by Margery Wolf and Roxane Witke, 143-168. California: Stanford University Press, 1975. ISBN 0-8047-0874-6. OCLC 1529107.
- Ying, Hu (2001). "Naming the First New Woman". Nan Nü. 3 (2): 196–231. doi:10.1163/156852601100402270. PMID 19484896.
- Hubbard, Joshua A. (16 December 2014). "Queering the New Woman: Ideals of Modern Femininity in The Ladies' Journal, 1915–1931". Nan Nü. 16 (2): 341–362. doi:10.1163/15685268-00162p05.
- Molony, Barbara, Janet M. Theiss, and Hyaeweol Choi. "New Women in the Interwar Period." Gender In Modern East Asia: An Integrated History, 224-268. Boulder, CO: Westview Press, a member of the Perseus Book Group, 2016. ISBN 978-0-8133-4875-9. OCLC 947808181.
- Molony, Barbara, Janet M. Theiss, and Hyaeweol Choi. "Nationalism and Feminism in the Interwar Period." In Gender In Modern East Asia: An Integrated History, 179-223. Boulder, CO: Westview Press, a member of the Perseus Book Group, 2016. ISBN 978-0-8133-4875-9. OCLC 947808181.
- Wolf, Margery. "Women and Suicide in China." In Women in Chinese Society, edited by Margery Wolf and Roxane Witke, 111-141. Stanford, California: Stanford University Press, 1975. ISBN 0-8047-0874-6. OCLC 1529107.
- Yang, Shu (20 February 2016). "I Am Nora, Hear Me Roar: The Rehabilitation of the Shrew in Modern Chinese Theater". Nan Nü. 18 (2): 291–325. doi:10.1163/15685268-00182p04.
