= Lucie Armstrong =

English-Irish journalist and writer

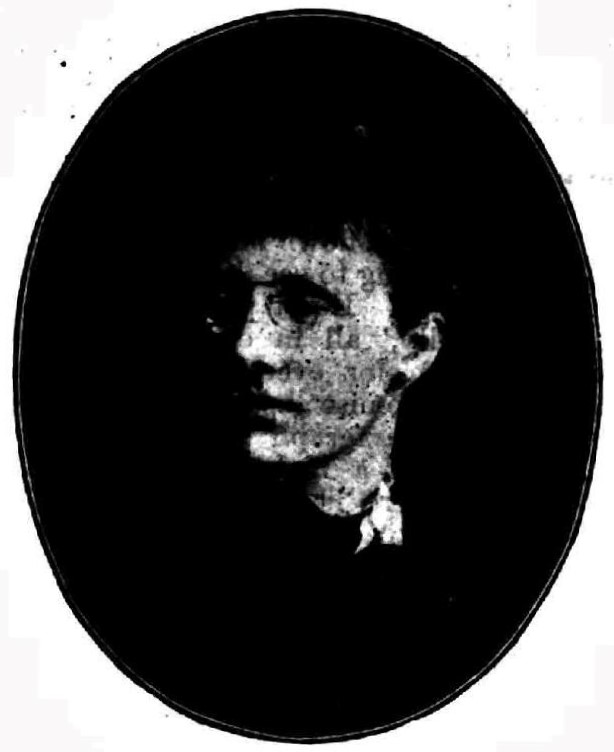
Lucie Armstrong in 1896

Lucie Armstrong, (née Cobbe; 1851 – 2 May 1907) also known as Lucie Heaton Armstrong, was an English-Irish journalist and writer on etiquette.

Armstrong had her first work—The Ball-Room Guide—published anonymously in 1880; this was followed by stories for children published in Little Folks magazine; these were then collected in book form in 1883 under the title Doll Stories. She published in several journals, magazines and newspapers, often anonymously or under pseudonyms, and published nine books, eight of which were on etiquette.

She was married once, only briefly. Her husband, John Heaton Armstrong, died of gastroenteritis four and a half months after the wedding.

== Biography ==
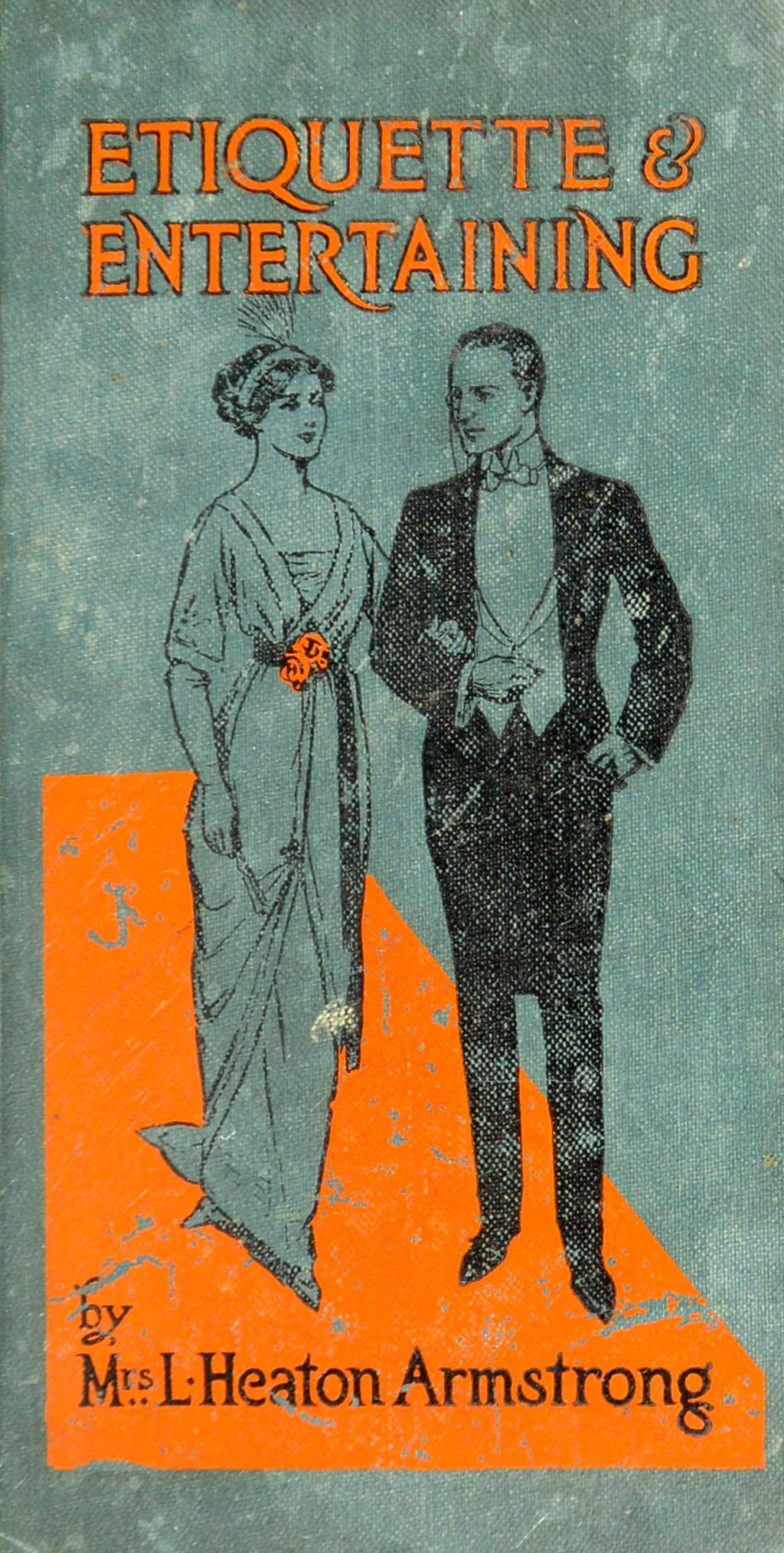
Cover of Etiquette and Entertaining (1903)

Armstrong was born Lucie Cobbe in 1851; her parents were Major Charles Henry Cobbe, of the 60th Bengal Native Infantry, and his wife. Charles was a descendant of the Cobbe family, which made Armstrong a second cousin to the women's suffrage campaigner Frances Power Cobbe. Her father had recently retired from the Bengal Army on health grounds after thirty years' service. He died before Armstrong reached the age of twenty, at which point she was an orphan.

A talented musician when she was young, Armstrong studied piano, either at the Royal Conservatory of Music or the Royal Academy of Music. She composed two hymns or anthems, including for the hymn "Oh, for the wings of a dove", which were played at Westminster Abbey. Over practising on the piano led to an impairment in her hands, and she turned to writing for a career. In 1880 she wrote The Ball-Room Guide, which was published anonymously, and soon afterwards had stories published in Cassell's Little Folks magazine for children. Some of the stories were reprinted in her second book, Doll Stories, which was published in 1883 under the name Lucie Cobbe.

In November 1885 she married John Childe Heaton Armstrong at the register office on The Strand; he was a 34-year-old translator and the elder brother of William Heaton-Armstrong, later a Member of Parliament for the Liberal Party. John and Lucie lived near the British Museum, but he died of gastroenteritis four and a half months after the wedding.

In 1893 Armstrong published The Etiquette of Party Giving, in which she not only provided the etiquette of giving a party, but also outlined several types of parties, including "A Clover Tea", "A Cobweb Party", "A Palette Party" and "An Epithet Party". The book was well received by Florence Fenwick-Miller, reviewing for The Illustrated London News, who called Armstrong an "accomplished authoress" who was experienced in writing on etiquette.

Armstrong published six further books on etiquette before her death on 2 May 1907 at the Camberwell House Asylum in South London.

== Works ==
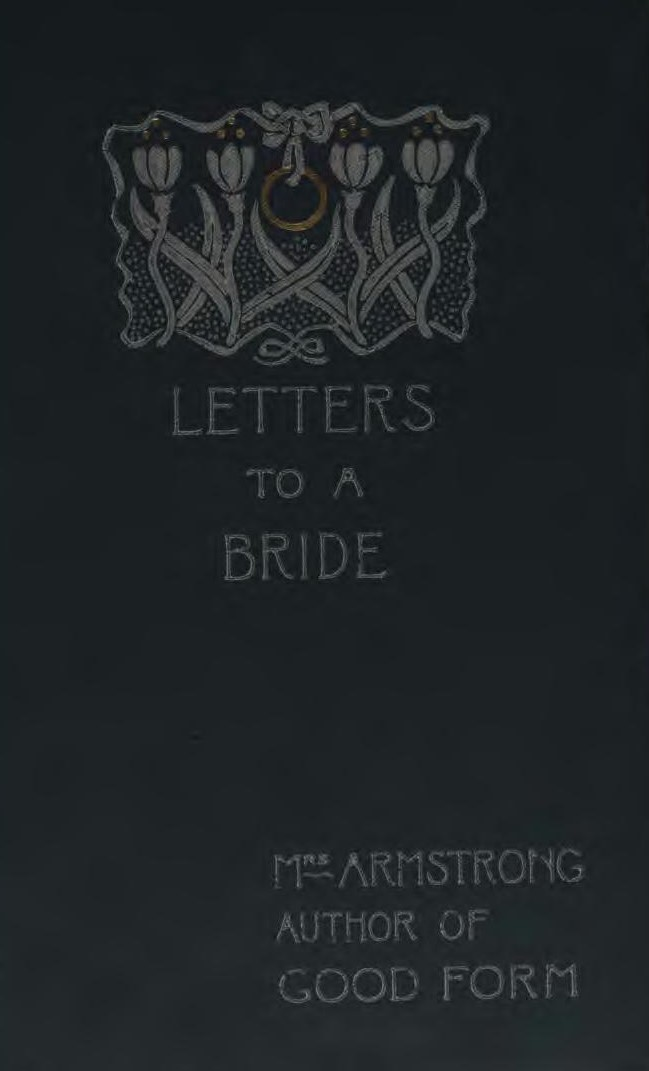
Front cover of Letters to a Bride (1896)

Armstrong is known to have written for, or been published in Lady's Pictorial, The Globe, Womanhood, The Court Journal, The Ludgate Monthly, The Woman's Signal (and its predecessor, Women's Paper Penny), John Bull, Belgravia, London Society, Chapman's Magazine of Fiction, The Sketch, Pall Mall Budget, Hearth and Home and several provincial journals. She published anonymously and under pseudonyms and several variants of her names, including Lucie Cobbe, Lucie Cobbe-Armstrong, Mrs L. Heaton Armstrong, Mrs Armstrong, Mrs Heaton Armstrong, Lucie Heaton Armstrong, Lucie H Armstrong, Lucy H Armstrong, Lucie Cobbe-Armstrong, Zingara, Comme-il-Faut and Aunt Priscilla.

- The Ball-Room Guide (1880) OCLC 224475426 (Updated in 1900 OCLC 497383973)
- Doll Stories (1883; as Lucie Cobbe) OCLC 557891710
- The Etiquette of Party Giving, etc (1893) OCLC 156099518
- Good Form. A Book of Every Day Etiquette (1889) OCLC 156097537
- Etiquette for Girls (1893) OCLC 606994094
- The Etiquette of Party Giving with Hints to Hostess and Guest (1893) OCLC 156099518
- Letters to a Bride, Including Letters to a Débutante (1896) OCLC 156099487
- Etiquette-up-to-Date (1898) OCLC 458515261
- Etiquette and Entertaining (1903) OCLC 556841890

== Sources ==
- "Editor's Thoughts". Womanhood. Vol. 17. June 1907. p. v.
- Fenwick-Miller, Florence (8 April 1893). "The Ladies' Column". The Illustrated London News. p. 21.
- Fenwick-Miller, Florence (11 June 1896). "Character Sketch". The Woman's Signal. pp. 369–370.
- "Literature". The Glasgow Herald. 16 February 1893. p. 9.
- Mitchell, Sally (2009). "Ephemeral Journalism and Its Uses: Lucie Cobbe Heaton Armstrong (1851–1907)". Victorian Periodicals Review. 42 (1): 81–92. doi:10.1353/vpr.0.0063. JSTOR 27760209. S2CID 162263270.
- "Notices". Morning Post. 25 November 1885. p. 1.
- Van Arsdel, Rosemary T. (2004). "Armstrong [née Cobbe], Lucie (1851–1907)". Oxford Dictionary of National Biography (online ed.). Oxford University Press. doi:10.1093/ref:odnb/59682. (Subscription, Wikipedia Library access or UK public library membership required.)
- "Women in Literature and Society" (PDF). Pickering & Chatto. November 2019.
