= Charles Drysdale =

Charles Drysdale may refer to:

- Charles Douglas Drysdale (1915–1984), Scottish nationalist activist
- Charles Robert Drysdale (1829–1907), British physician
- Charles Vickery Drysdale (1874–1961), British electrical engineer and social reformer
