= Alice Vickery =

English physician and activist (1844–1929)

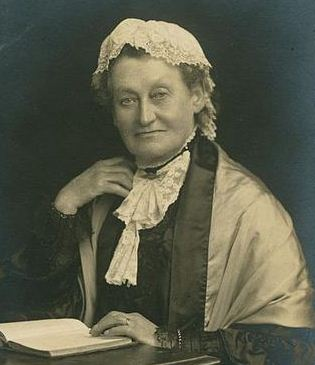
- Photograph of Vickery given by Rosika Schwimmer to the New York Public Library
- Born: Swimbridge, Devon, England
- Baptised: 13 October 1844
- Died: 12 January 1929 (aged 84); Brighton, England
- Burial place: Brookwood Cemetery, Surrey, England
- Education: Ladies' Medical College, University of Paris, Obstetrical Society, Royal Pharmaceutical Society
- Alma mater: London School of Medicine for Women
- Occupation: Physician
- Known for: Birth control activism and as the first British woman to qualify as a chemist and pharmacist
- Movement: Malthusian League, Women's Freedom League
- Partner: Charles Robert Drysdale
- Children: Charles Vickery Drysdale (1874); George Vickery Drysdale (1881)

Alice Vickery (also known as A. Vickery Drysdale and A. Drysdale Vickery, c. 1844 – 12 January 1929) was an English physician, campaigner for women's rights, and the first British woman to qualify as a chemist and pharmacist. She and her life partner, Charles Robert Drysdale, also a physician, actively supported a number of causes, including free love, birth control, and destigmatisation of illegitimacy.

== Early life and education ==
Vickery was born in Swimbridge, Devon, in 1844, as the fifth child and second daughter of John Vickery, a piano maker and organ builder, and his wife Frances Mary Vickery née Leah. By 1851, the family had moved to Peckham, South London, but Vickery remained in Devon at school. She joined her family in London in 1861 and founded employment as a pupil teacher.

Vickery began her medical career at the Ladies' Medical College in 1869. There she met the lecturer Charles Robert Drysdale and started a relationship with him. They never married, as they both agreed that marriage was "legal prostitution" and opposed the institution. Society, however, generally presumed that the pair were married, as had their contemporaries known that they were in a free union, their careers likely would have suffered. Vickery sometimes added Drysdale's name to her own, referring to herself both as "Dr. Vickery Drysdale" and as "Dr. Drysdale Vickery".

In 1873, Vickery obtained a midwife's degree from the Obstetrical Society. On 18 June the same year, she passed the Royal Pharmaceutical Society's Minor exam, becoming the first qualified female chemist and druggist. Afterward, Vickery went to study medicine at the University of Paris, as women were not allowed to attend any British medical school. There she gave birth to her first child, Charles Vickery Drysdale, in 1874.

Vickery became fluent in French, later publishing translations of important French works through organisations such as the National British Women’s Temperance Association’s magazine Woman’s Signal. Her translation of "On the Admission of Women to the Rights of Citizenship" by the philosopher and mathematician Marquis de Condorcet was published in 1912.

The UK Medical Act 1876 allowed women to obtain medical degrees. Vickery returned to England in 1877, after the King and Queen's College of Physicians, Ireland, refused to recognise her previous qualifications. In 1880, she became one of five women who qualified as physicians in the kingdom, obtaining her degree from the London School of Medicine for Women, and started practising medicine. In August 1881 her second son, George Vickery Drysdale was born.

== Activism ==
Vickery became an early member of the Malthusian League and an outspoken supporter of birth control after the trial of Annie Besant and Charles Bradlaugh, who were arrested for publishing a book about contraception in 1877. When she was called to testify at the trial, she spoke about the dangers of too frequent childbirths and of using over-lactation as a contraception method. Vickery had to temporarily withdraw from the Malthusian League, however, because the London Medical School for Women did not approve of her activities. She resumed membership in 1880, when she obtained her degree.

In 1885, Vickery read a paper to the London Dialectical Society on infant mortality. She actively opposed the Contagious Diseases Acts, which was repealed in 1886. She spent the following decades lecturing about birth control as a key element to the emancipation of women.

Both Vickery and Drysdale joined the Legitimation League, set up in 1893, and campaigned for equal rights for children born out of wedlock. Vickery felt that the organisation "did not go far enough" until it started advocating free love. She delivered a talk to the Actresses Franchise League on "The Injustices and Inequalities of Marriage Laws", sharing a platform with the writer and physician Sir Arthur Conan Doyle.

Vickery was successively a member of the women's suffrage organisations the National Society for Women's Suffrage, the Women's Social and Political Union (WSPU), and the Women's Freedom League (WFL), and was president of the Herne Hill and West Norwood WFL branch. The Hendon Women’s Franchise Society, affiliated to the United Suffragists, was founded during a meeting at Vickery's house in Dulwich. She participated in demonstrations, wrote for the feminist periodical Shafts, was a WFL delegate to the Congress of the International Women’s Suffrage Alliance in Amsterdam in 1908, boycotted the 1911 census and donated generously to suffrage causes, but the main focus of her political campaigning continued to be birth control. Her son Charles Vickery Drysdale was a founding member of the Men’s League for Women’s Suffrage in 1907.

Vickery founded the Women's branch of the International Malthusian League in 1904. After Drysdale's death in 1907, she continued practising as a physician and succeeded him as president of the Malthusian League, while their elder son Charles and daughter-in-law Bessie Ingman became the new editors of the journal Malthusian. When the American birth control activist Margaret Sanger visited Britain in 1915 she met with Vickery. Vickery also instructed the working class women of south-east London in birth control methods, after an invitation by Rotherhithe social worker Anna Martin. She believed in educating both "well to do" women and those of the "lower strata" of society.

Vickey also became one of the first members of the Eugenics Education Society, but questioned their neglect of highlighting the relationship between family size and female emancipation. She also argued that the “true” sexual selection, of females selecting their mates, was inherently eugenic.

== Later years ==
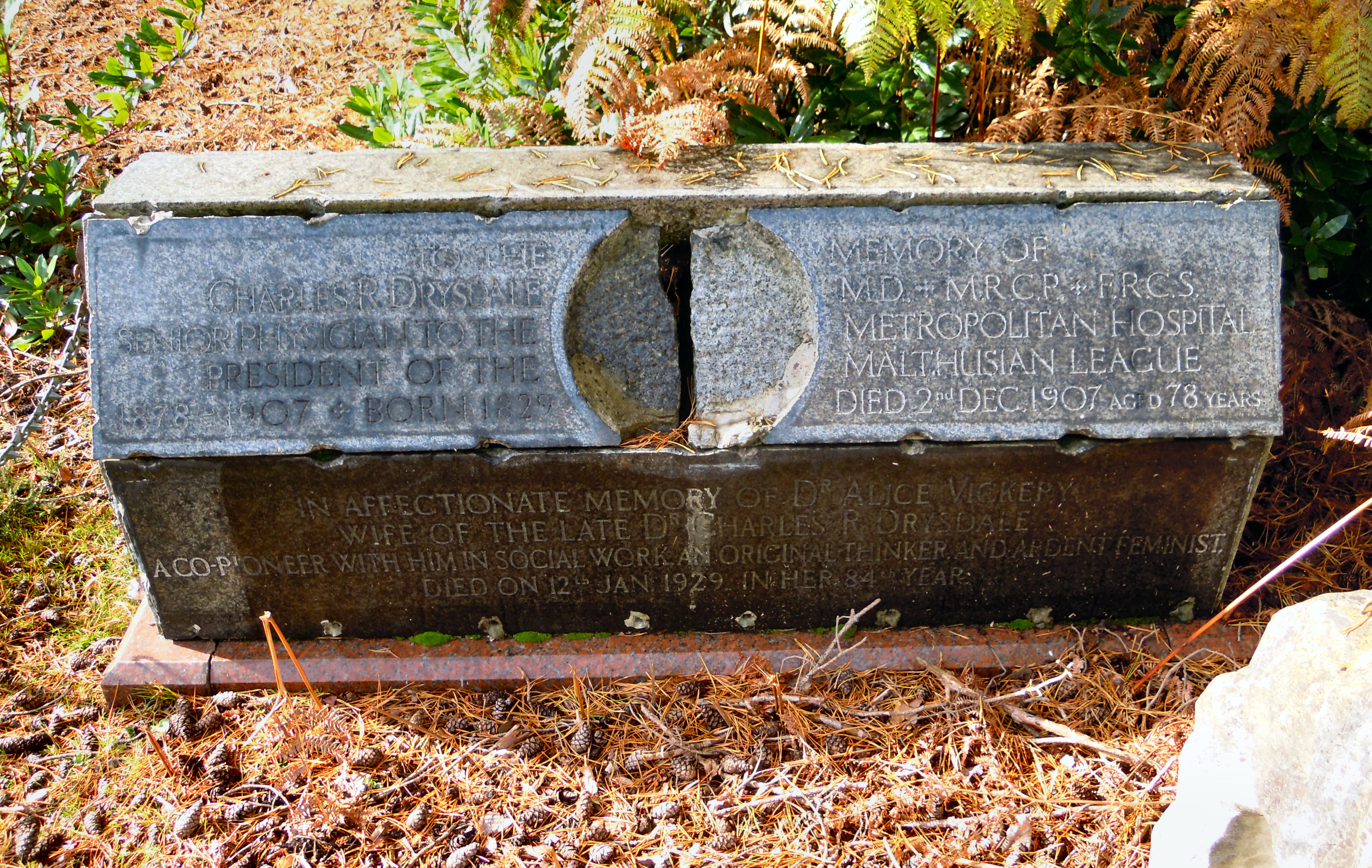
The grave of Alice Vickery in Brookwood Cemetery

In 1921 Vickery resigned from her position as president of the Malthusian League due to ill health. She moved to Brighton in 1923 to be near her elder son. She regularly addressed meetings of the local branch of the Women's Freedom League and became president.

== Death ==
She died of pneumonia on 12 January 1929, a few days after delivering an address that became her final public presentation. She was buried with Charles Robert Drysdale in Brookwood Cemetery.

In an obiturary written by Edith How-Martyn for Women, and reprinted in the Ethical Record, she was described as doing "spade work for the woman's side" in the Malthusian movement, and "above all a feminist".
