= Helen Cecelia Black =

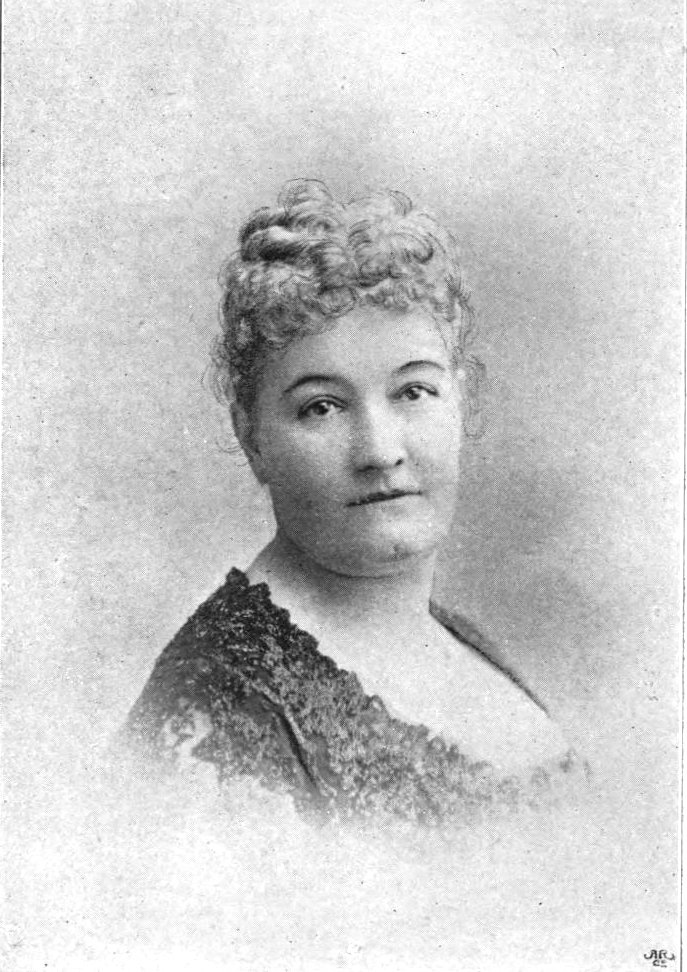
- Born: Helen Cecelia Spottiswoode; 12 November 1836; Cawnpore, Bengal, India
- Died: 8 February 1906 (aged 69)
- Occupations: Journalist, philanthropist
- Notable work: Notable Women Authors of the Day (1893)
- Spouse: Thomas Black (m. 1856; died 1879)
- Parent: Arthur Cole Spottiswoode (father) Jessy Eliza Loveday (mother)

Helen Cecelia Black (née Spottiswoode; 12 November 1836 – 8 February 1906) was an English journalist, best known for the series of interviews with women writers published in book form in 1893 as Notable Women Authors of the Day.

== Life ==
Helen Spottiswoode was born in Cawnpore, Bengal, India, the daughter of Maj.-Gen. Arthur Cole Spottiswoode and Jessy Eliza Loveday. In 1856, she married Thomas Black, a captain and company manager for P&O. She founded St Mary's Cottage Hospital, a charity hospital specializing in leg ailments, in Southampton in 1872. After her husband's death in 1879, she moved to London and worked as a journalist for periodicals including the Lady’s Pictorial, Womanhood, Black and White, The Sketch and Queen. Her friends included Sarah Grand and Marie Corelli.

== Works ==
- Notable women authors of the day; biographical sketches, 1893
- Pen, pencil, baton and mask; biographical sketches, 1896
- From Deal to South Africa, 1901
