= Lady's Pictorial =

Defunct English women's magazine

- First issue: September 1880; 145 years ago
- Final issue: February 26, 1921; 105 years ago
- Country: United Kingdom

Lady's Pictorial was an English women's magazine aimed at middle class audience that was particularly well known in the 1890s. It ran from September 1880 to 26 February 1921, when it merged with Eve: The Lady's Pictorial. It began as a monthly, priced at 3d., and became a weekly issued every Saturday from 5 March 1881, still priced at 3d. In 1884 it was revamped into a larger format (with some other improvements) at the higher price of 6d. Its price remained 6d. until 1918.

== Description ==
The founder and first editor of the Lady's Pictorial was Alfred Gibbons. In an 1895 interview he said that he established it as a rival to The Queen: The Ladies Newspaper and Court Chronicle. In his opinion, this older paper, which had begun in 1864, had made no attempt to keep up-to-date in terms of the techniques it used for its illustrations, and had long relied on Paris (rather than London) as the source of its fashion plates. Unlike what he took to be other more solely "literary" oriented editors, Gibbons clearly took a strong interest in the production or "make-up" of his publication. An early example of a Meisenbach halftone portrait of the Italian ballet dancer Emma Palladino (then performing in London) appeared in the Lady's Pictorial in 1882, soon after Georg Meisenbach patented this process.

In 1887 Gibbons began pioneering the printing colored pictures of pretty women rather than a seasonable subject (such as Santa Claus) for the Lady's Pictorial Christmas annuals. The circulation figures he gave for these usefully reveal the increasing popularity of the magazine. The first, "Sweet Sixteen," by the Italian painter Corcos, sold 80,000 copies. The following year, "Lady Love," by the same artist, sold 125,000 copies. Another picture by Corcos, "The Queen of the Roses," mentioned by Gibbons in his 1895 interview as he pointed to the original painting on his office wall, sold 175,000 copies.

When asked about the success of the magazine in the crowded market of "ladies' papers" Gibbons said (in his 1895 interview) it was due in part to the "sincere interest" and perfectionist impulse that he put into it; their high artistic standards, involving illustrations commissioned from many "strongly original unconventional artists;" their "large employment of women writers;" and (perhaps most importantly) because he was "splendidly backed, both with unlimited capital and sound advice, by Sir William and Mr. Charles Ingram, of the Illustrated London News." Two of the Ingram's other successful illustrated weeklies of the mid-1890s were The Sketch and the Illustrated Sporting and Dramatic News.

In its entry in the 1895 Newspaper Press Directory the Lady's Pictorial is listed as "neutral" in its political orientation and described as "A newspaper for the home. A specially arranged paper for ladies; well edited, and admirably illustrated. Not a mere fashion journal, but deals with all subjects interesting to ladies."

A Victorian studies specialist examining a random volume of the Lady's Pictorial from the 1890s noted as significant the presence of a serial by the New Woman writer Ella Hepworth Dixon: her book The Story of a Modern Woman (with illustrations by an unknown artist) first appeared in weekly installments between 6 January 1894 to 24 March 1894. In addition, there was "a series on women's sports, and pictures of prize winners from the London School of Medicine for Women. More than half the pages, however, are occupied by answers to correspondents on music, art, fashion, fancy work, furnishings, children, pets, health, cookery, etiquette, beauty, antiques, graphology, and other subjects."

Anna Kingsford, who studied medicine in Paris, graduating in 1880, contributed a series of “Letters to Ladies” to the Lady’s Pictorial between 1884 and 1886. Due to their popularity her columns were reissued in 1886 in a book titled Health, Beauty and the Toilet: Letters to Ladies from a Lady Doctor. A posthumous revised third edition appeared in 1889. The first letter in Kingsford’s book deals with obesity, and an 1888 obituary for Kingsford published in the Lady’s Pictorial reports that in her medical practice she had great success in treating “hysterical girls.”

Ada Ballin, possibly following an interim replacement, took over Anna Kingsford as the editor of the magazine’s health and beauty section from July 1887.

In his 1895 interview Gibbons said his magazine did not bother much with cookery and home-dressmaking, as he believed "that ladies who can afford to spend sixpence in buying the Lady's Pictorial also can afford to keep proper servants and go to good dressmakers." Regarding the "New Woman," he claimed "We are simply on the side of the womanly woman. It isn't our business to indulge in strong views on any subject, but merely to put what we think are right views firmly."

Representative of the interest they took in suitable professions for women, the Lady's Pictorial from November 1893 to February 1894 ran a series on "Lady Journalists." Nearly all of them were contributors. They include brief profiles (and some photographic portraits) of nearly forty of the major women journalists of the era (and usefully reveal some of their pseudonyms, although others, who preferred to remain anonymous, were not covered). The first installment includes Emily Crawford, Mrs. Humphry, Mrs. Power O'Donoghue, Mary Frances Billington, Emily Faithfull and Florence Fenwick Miller. The second has Mrs Lynn Linton, Charlotte O'Connor Eccles and Marie Belloc Lowndes; the third Lady Colin Campbell, Mrs Stannard ("John Strange Winter") and Ada Ballin; the fourth Alice Meynell; while Ella Hepworth Dixon, Annie S. Swan, Catharine Drew and Lucie Armstrong appear in the last.

In one of her autobiographies, the American journalist Elizabeth Banks (who moved to England in 1893 and gained a reputation for her investigative reporting, often involving impersonating working class women) relates how Alfred Gibbons took three hours to come up with an undercover assignment for her to go to Kent and pick strawberries. After she submitted a draft, he was appalled to learn that she had endangered her health by continuing to work all day in the rain. Banks describes Gibbons as gruff, but very kind and considerate: he offered the "most liberal terms I had ever received for any London work," immediately paid her for the extra column that she required beyond what he had originally allocated, and was willing to cover her doctor's bill as part of her expenses.

Helen C. Black's Notable Women Authors of the Day: Biographical Sketches (1893), which profiled the lives of twenty prominent British women writers, first appeared as a series of separate articles in the Lady's Pictorial before they were revised, enlarged and updated for book publication.

Some of the prestigious contributors of stories to the Lady's Pictorial Summer and Christmas numbers are Rhoda Broughton, Marie Corelli, Violet Hunt and Margaret Oliphant. Marie Corelli is known to have contributed three articles to the Lady’s Pictorial Christmas numbers in 1891, 1894, and 1895, apparently based on press reports rather than surviving copies of the relevant issues in libraries. The novels that the magazine serialized were not exclusively written by women: in his 1895 interview Gibbons refers to books by Marion Crawford and W. E. Norris. At the Circulating Library: A Database of Victorian Fiction, 1837–1901, provides a list of some of the fiction first published in the Lady's Pictorial.

The artists employed by the Lady’s Pictorial include Maurice Greiffenhagen, Dudley Hardy, Bernard Partridge, Fred Pegram and F. H. Townsend. On 24 September 1887 Oscar Wilde wrote to Partridge, then a young and relatively unknown artist, sending him two short poems suitable for illustration. The illustrated poems, "Le Panneau" and "Les Ballons," appeared in the Lady's Pictorial in December 1887, and Partridge later collaborated with Wilde to illustrate two other works, "The Young King" and "In the Forrest" that appeared in the Lady’s Pictorial Christmas numbers for 1888 and 1899. The Lady's Pictorial is considered to hold "a very high position in the record of the black-and-white art of the nineties" as "perhaps the best illustrated paper in England," when "many lovers of things artistic—even mere males—bought it (and especially its Christmas numbers) solely for the excellence of its drawings."

Due to poor health, Gibbons had less direct involvement in editing the Lady's Pictorial in the late 1890s. He died in 1900 at Grasse on the French Riviera.

In the “Nausicaa” episode of his novel Ulysses (1922) James Joyce refers to Gerty MacDowell as “a votary of Dame Fashion” dressed in a home dyed “neat blouse of electric blue (because it was expected in the Lady's Pictorial that electric blue would be worn).” The Lady's Pictorial for 11 June 1904 (contemporary to the day on which the events of the novel take place) has been noted to have "a number of connections" with the novel, but so too do issues from 1919 (which Joyce could have read while he was composing the novel). Joyce does not seem to have drawn on a specific issue as a direct source, but in a more general way parodies the language of advertisements printed in women’s magazines throughout the first half of this section of his narrative.

In her memoir published in 1930, Ella Hepworth Dixon recalled that the Lady's Pictorial "had an enormous vogue in Suburbia."
