= Bessie Drysdale =

British activist and writer (1871–1950)

- Born: c. 1871; Hereford, Herefordshire, England
- Died: 1950 (aged 78–79)
- Occupations: Teacher, activist, and writer
- Years active: 1907–1950
- Organization(s): Malthusian League, Women's Social and Political Union, Women's Freedom League
- Known for: Birth control campaigning and suffrage activism
- Spouse: Charles Vickery Drysdale (m. 1898)
- Children: 2

Bessie Drysdale (née Ingram Edwards, 1871–1950) was a British teacher, suffragette activist, birth control campaigner, eugenicist and writer. She was a member of the Women’s Social and Political Union’s (WSPU) National Executive Committee and secretary of the Malthusian League.

== Early life ==
Drysdale was born in 1871 in Hereford, Herefordshire, England. She worked as a teacher at Stockwell College in South London.

== Marriage ==
Drysdale married Charles Vickery Drysdale in 1898, whose parents were Charles Robert Drysdale and Alice Vickery. He was an electrical engineer, fellow eugenicist, and social reformer, and was a founder member of the Men's League for Women's Suffrage (MLWS). The couple had one daughter called Eva Drysdale who died in 1914, aged 13, and an adopted son called Eric Charles Drysdale.

== Suffrage activism ==
Drysdale was a member of the Women's Social and Political Union (WSPU). She was one of the 52 women arrested during a suffragette march to the House of Commons on 14 February 1907 and spent 21 days in Holloway Prison. Later in 1907, Drysdale left the WSPU to join the breakaway group the Women's Freedom League (WFL). In 1908 she attended the congress of the International Women’s Suffrage Alliance in Stockholm, Sweden, as the WFL delegate. Her husband also attended to represent the Men's League for Women's Suffrage (MLWS).

When the 1911 census was taken, Drysdale participated in the suffragette boycott and wrote on her form: “as the Government refuses me a vote and as I am not therefore recognised as a citizen, I refuse to perform the duties of one in giving the information required by the Government”. She signed as a member of the WFL.

Drysdale left the WFL in April 1912 to campaign for women's enfranchisement independently. During this time she also wrote for the short lived radical feminist magazine The Freewoman (1911-1913), which covered topics including sexuality, women's rights, motherhood and marriage.

== Birth control activism ==
Drysdale believed that the limitation of family size was the "lever for individual and social betterment," "a cure for social ills" and key to achieving women's emancipation. She became a leader of the British birth control movement, advocating for women's access to abortion. From 1911 to 1923 Drysdale was secretary of the British eugenics and family planning organisation, the Malthusian League. She was also a member of the Eugenics Society. Drysdale was one of the most prominent female members of these organisations and often highlighted the erasure of women's bodies and opinions in discourse about reproduction, through her writing and talks.

During the First World War, Drysdale published leaflets concerning the need to reduce the birth-rate during war shortages. She also hinted in an article for the Daily Mirror about the possibility of women refusing "en masse" to give up their sons for war and that they could go on "birth strike" if "men would not listen to them." Drysdale however rejoiced at the end of the war, writing that if Germany had won that "democracy would have gone down in the dust before Germany's false goals and awful military power."

Drysdale continued writing after the war, and attacked collectivism and socialism in her 1920 pamphlet "Labour Troubles and Birth Control". In 1923 she ended an article with the line "working men and women look to yourselves, and get rid of poverty by refusing to breed it." An earlier leaflet, published in 1915, implored "To working men and women! Get rid of poverty by keeping your family to the size you can bring up well." It has been suggested by historians that Drysdale may have invented stories for a working class perspective for her papers. She has been described as "virulently anti-socialist," held an "abiding hatred of collectivism" and was known to condemn militant trade unionists. Her stance on socialism led to H. G. Wells threatening to resign from his role as vice president of the Malthusian League in 1915.

When the post-war Ministry of Health committed £1,100,000 to maternity care and child welfare programmes, Drysdale opposed the measure. She argued that the middle class was already overburdened with taxation to support the lower classes who created their own conditions by having too many children instead of adopting family planning methods. She wondered how long parents of small families would be expected to allow the poor to "solve their endless crises at the public expense". She also wrote negatively about that areas of poor housing, stating that "slums are to a great extent made and constantly inhabited by natural slum types."

Also after the war, Drysdale personally campaigned about family planning on a motor car tour, and arranged meetings across Britain held by the American birth control campaigner Margaret Sanger. Bessie gave Margaret advice about how to dress, telling her that the more radical a persons ideas the more conservatively they should dress. They attended an international conference of the Malthusian League together in Holland in 1921. She also worked alongside other activists, such as Marie Stopes, who Drysdale described as "powerful and disagreeable with a catty way of making tremendous publicity."

In 1922, Drysdale, her husband and Norman Haire founded the Walworth Women's Welfare Centre. This was one of the first birth control clinics in the country. and offered medical treatment and lectures on topic such as birth control, anatomy, physiology and hygiene for poor women. Drysdale and Haire disagreed about advertising the centre and he quit after they quarrelled about Drysdale's proposal for a "grand opening" day, but they later reconciled and he returned to work with the Drysdales at the centre.

== Death ==
Drysdale continued campaigning until she died in 1950.
