= O2 Academy Leeds =

Music venue in Leeds, England

O_{2} Academy Leeds
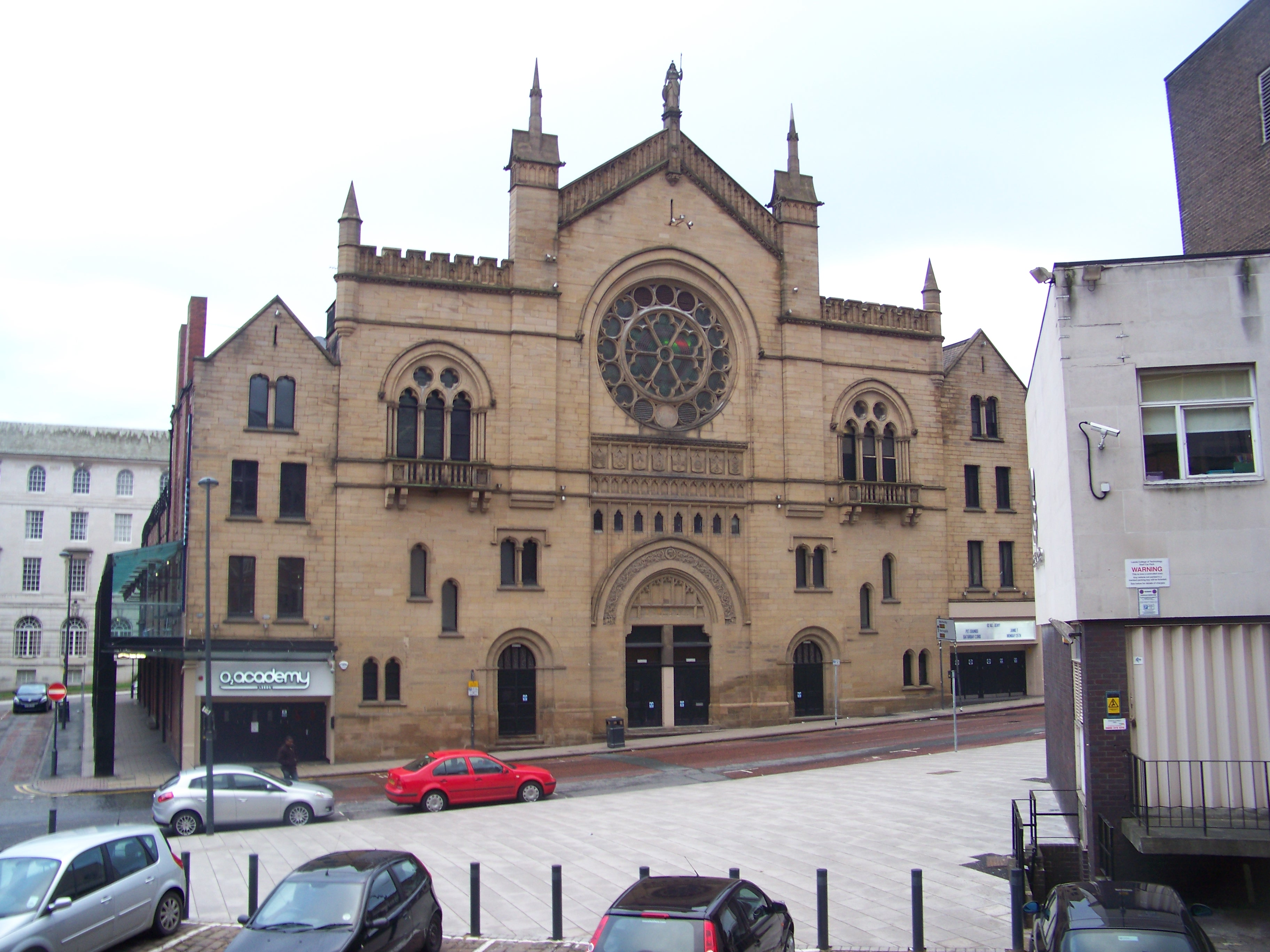
- Front exterior view of the venue (c.2010)
- Interactive map of O_{2} Academy Leeds
- Former names: Leeds Coliseum (1885–1938); Gaumont Coliseum (1938–61); Coliseum Theatre (1961–92); Town and Country Club (1992–2000); Creation (2001–07); Leeds Academy (2008); Carling Academy Leeds (2008–2009)
- Address: 55 Cookridge St; Leeds LS2 3AW; England
- Location: Millennium Square
- Coordinates: 53.802043°N 1.547069°W
- Owner: Academy Music Group
- Capacity: 2,300

Construction
- Opened: 15 July 1885
- Renovated: 1895, 1938, 1992, 2001, 2007
- Architect: William Bakewell

Website
- Venue Website

The O_{2} Academy Leeds (formerly known as the Town and Country Club) is a music venue situated in Leeds, West Yorkshire, England. It is run by the Academy Music Group, which has other music venues around the UK. The academy was nominated for the TPi Awards 2010 for the country's favourite venue.

== Building history ==
The venue for the Leeds Academy on Cookridge Street in the city was originally opened in 1885 by Prince Albert and is a grade II listed Gothic building. In the nineteenth century there was a legal dispute with the Sunday Lecture Society that met here as they were accused of disturbing the sabbath. The venue was known originally as the Coliseum where it hosted many different events during the early 20th century such as political meetings and circus shows. Between the 1930s and 1990s the building accommodated a cinema, television studio and bingo hall.

The venue opened in 1992 as the Town and Country Club and between 1992 and 2000 staged gigs by artists such as Placebo, Blur, Tangerine Dream, Robbie Williams, The Stereophonics, East 17 and The Stone Roses. The venue however closed in 2000.

In 2001, after a £7 million re-development of the venue by First Leisure Corporation, it opened as Creation Nightclub, but closed after six years in February 2007. The licence was acquired by AMG from Luminar and plans put in place for the new Leeds Academy in November 2007.

== The venue ==
The venue itself has a large room accommodating 2,300 guests, including a balcony which can hold 500 people. There is also a basement room for gigs by up and coming bands which will accommodate 400 guests. The Kaiser Chiefs opened the venue with a gig on 8 October 2008 Some other well known musicians which have played at The academy have included: Twenty One Pilots, Marina & The Diamonds, Cher Lloyd, All Time Low, Foals, Wolfmother, Levellers, Michael Schenker, Last Shadow Puppets, Ellie Goulding, The Pigeon Detectives, MGMT, Paolo Nutini, Anthrax, The Proclaimers, Robbie Williams, Madness, The Fratellis, Counting Crows, Johnny Marr, Beady Eye, The Pogues, Deftones, Band of Horses, Slayer, Crystal Castles and Hot Chip.

On 6 November 2008, it was announced that Telefónica Europe (owners of the O_{2} Network in the UK) had become the new sponsor of all Academy venues, in a deal with music promoter Live Nation. The deal, which lasts for five years, sees all venues rebranded "The O_{2} Academy", in line with Telefónica's purchase of the Millennium Dome (now The O_{2}).

== Gallery ==
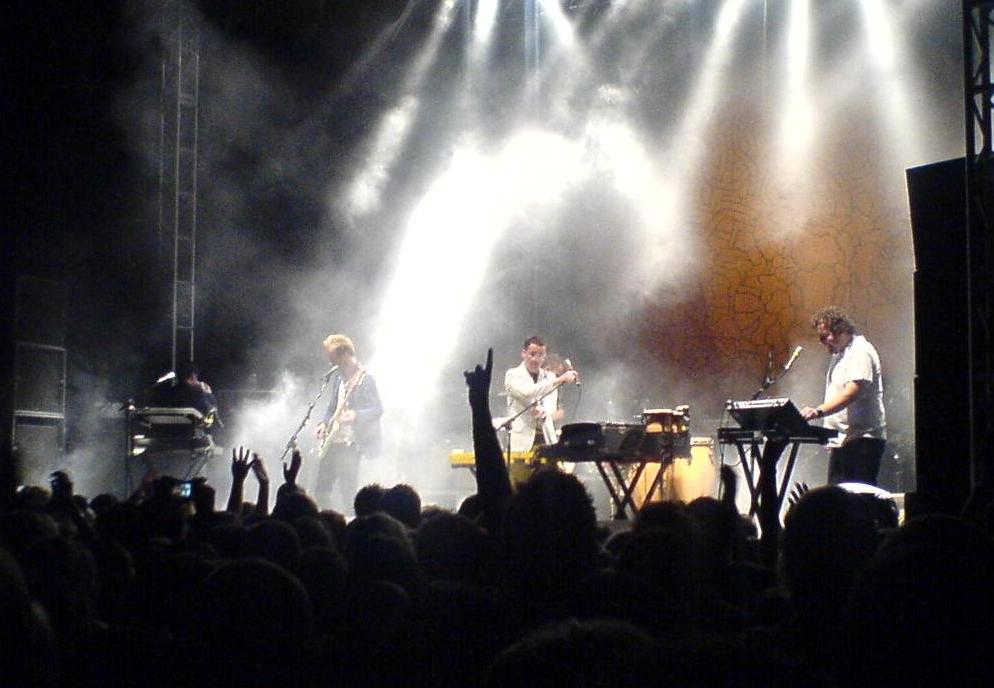
Hot Chip performing on stage at the Leeds Academy

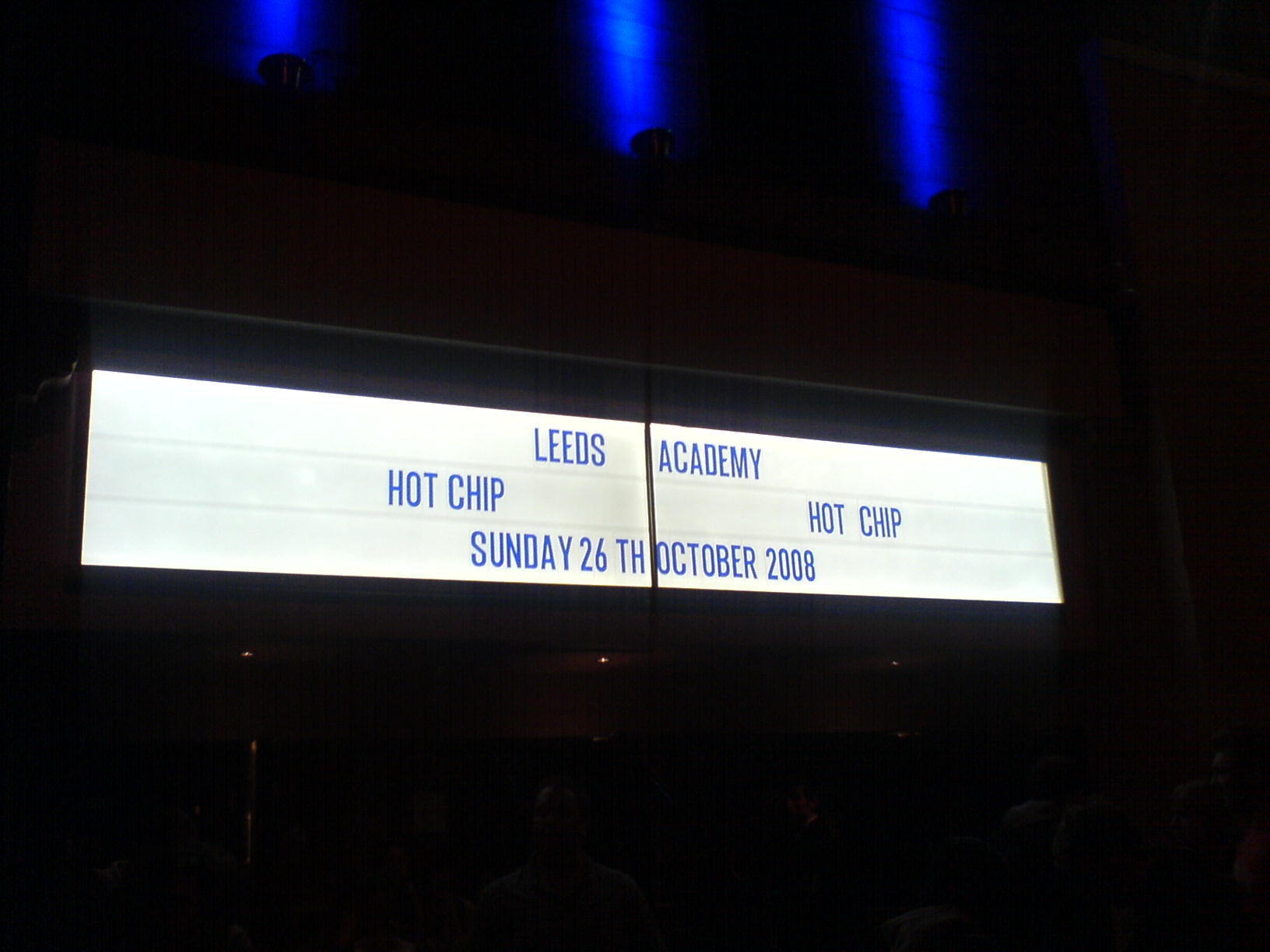
Event schedule

== See also ==
- Listed buildings in Leeds
- Music in Leeds
