= Malthusian League =

Early British eugenics and family planning organisation (1877–1927)

The Malthusian League was a British organisation which advocated the practice of contraception and the education of the public about the importance of family planning. It was established in 1877 and was dissolved in 1927. The organisation was secular, utilitarian, individualistic, and "above all malthusian." The organisation maintained that it was concerned about the poverty of the British working class and held that over-population was the chief cause of poverty.

== History ==
The league was initially founded during the "Knowlton trial" of Annie Besant and Charles Bradlaugh in July 1877. They were prosecuted for publishing Charles Knowlton's Fruits of Philosophy which explained various methods of birth control. The League was formed as a permanent body to advocate for the elimination of penalties for promoting birth control as well as to promote public education in matters of contraception. The trial demonstrated that the public was interested in the topic of contraception and sales of the book surged during the trial.

== Origins ==
The first president was Charles Robert Drysdale, who was succeeded by his free union partner Alice Vickery. Their daughter in law Bessie Drysdale was secretary from 1911 to 1923.

The league initially restricted itself primarily to an "educative role" which emphasised the importance of Malthus' economic arguments rather than practical information about birth control. The league had an increasingly socially and economically conservative tone as the 19th century wore on. Thus some earlier agreement between Malthusians and social reformers was replaced by mutual distrust. The league believed that the sole cause of poverty was an excess of births, and therefore opposed socialism, considered strikes and reforms of labour laws to be "useless."

League members were primarily middle class and did not make many serious efforts to communicate with the working class aside from some debates with socialists during the 1880s. Although the league doctrine as a whole was hostile to socialism, some members were indeed socialists who were sympathetic to arguments in favour of birth control. The league also maintained some overlap with the women's rights movement, which was concerned with birth control. The League began plans for a birth control clinic in 1917, but these stalled until they received funds from the philanthropist Sir John Sumner. The clinic finally opened on 9 November 1921 at 153a East Street, Walworth with Norman Haire as their honorary medical officer, three afternoons a week. Marie Stopes and her husband had opened their clinic nine months earlier. Stopes’ clinic was the first in the British Empire (but not the first in the world) and the League always emphasised that theirs was the first English clinic where birth control instruction was given under medical supervision.

== International Movements ==
Similar leagues were founded in several other European countries including Germany, France, and the Netherlands in the following years. In 1892, the Dutch league became the first to set up a medical clinic to provide information directly to the poor.

The period of the league's activity coincided with a substantial drop in the birth rate in Britain, and many European countries. Some have credited its activities, but others have disputed this conclusion, citing the general fall in birth rates even in countries without active league activity.

The Malthusian League forms part of the society within Aldous Huxley's novel Brave New World.

== See also ==
- List of population concern organizations
