= Charles Vickery Drysdale =

English electrical engineer, eugenicist, and social reformer (1874–1961)

Charles Vickery Drysdale FRSE CB OBE
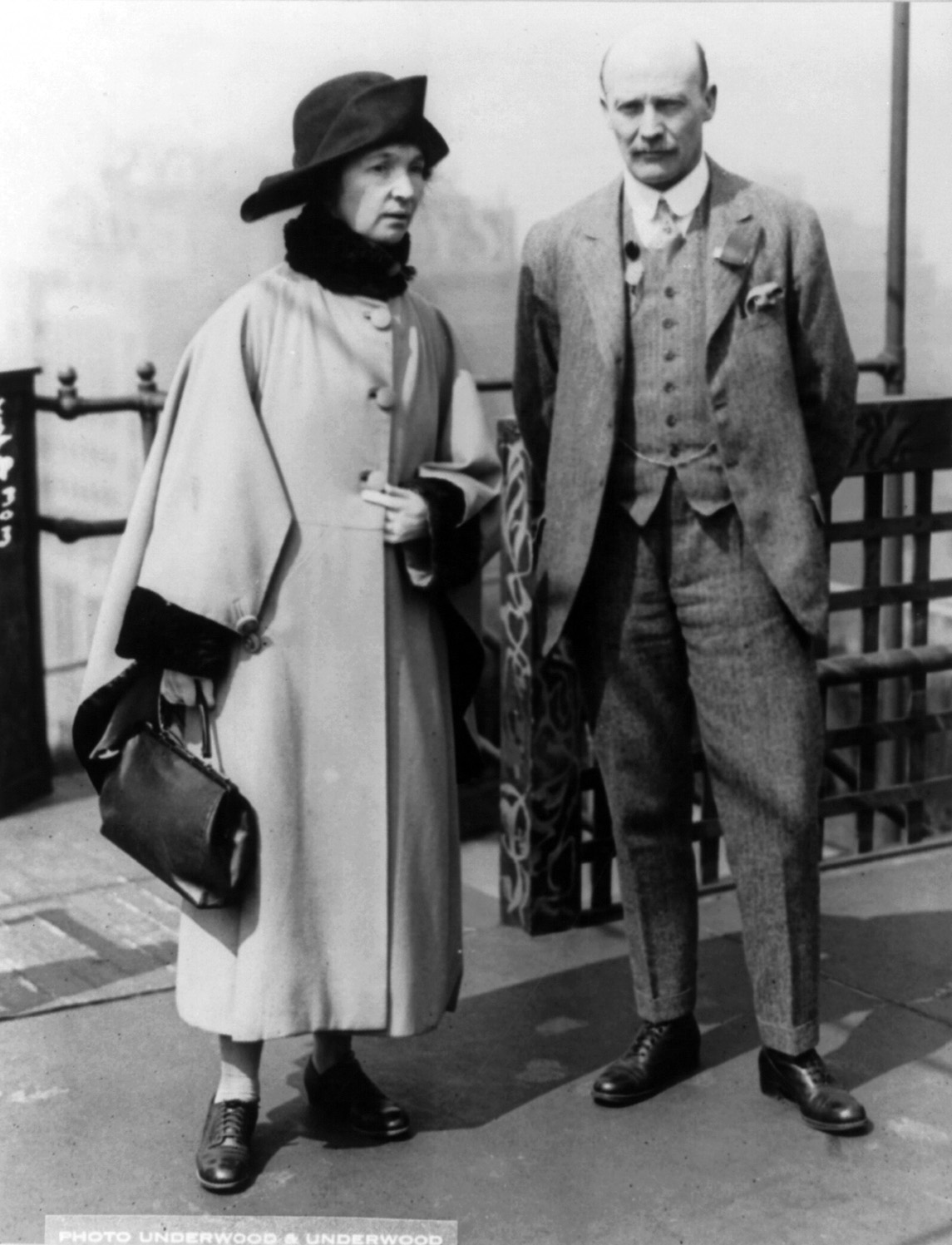
- Vickery and Margaret Sanger in 1925
- Born: 8 July 1874; Paris, France
- Died: 7 February 1961 (aged 86); Pebsham, Sussex, England
- Burial place: Brookwood Cemetery, Surrey, England
- Organization(s): Family Planning Association; Malthusian League; Physical Society of London; Institute of Physics; Men's League for Women's Suffrage; Royal Society of Edinburgh
- Spouse: Bessie Ingman Edwards (m. 1898)
- Parents: Charles Robert Drysdale (father); Alice Vickery (mother)
- Awards: Duddell Medal (1936)

Charles Vickery Drysdale FRSE CB OBE (8 July 1874 – 7 February 1961) was an English electrical engineer, eugenicist, suffragist, and social reformer. He is remembered for opening the second birth control clinic in Britain in 1921 and co-founding the Family Planning Association in 1930.

As an engineer he is remembered as the inventor of the Phase-shifting transformer. He was co-founder of the Institute of Physics and served as its vice-president 1932–1936.

He was first a Malthusian and then a Neo-Malthusian and served as President of the Malthusian League. He is seen as a founding father of Neo-Malthusianism.

== Life ==
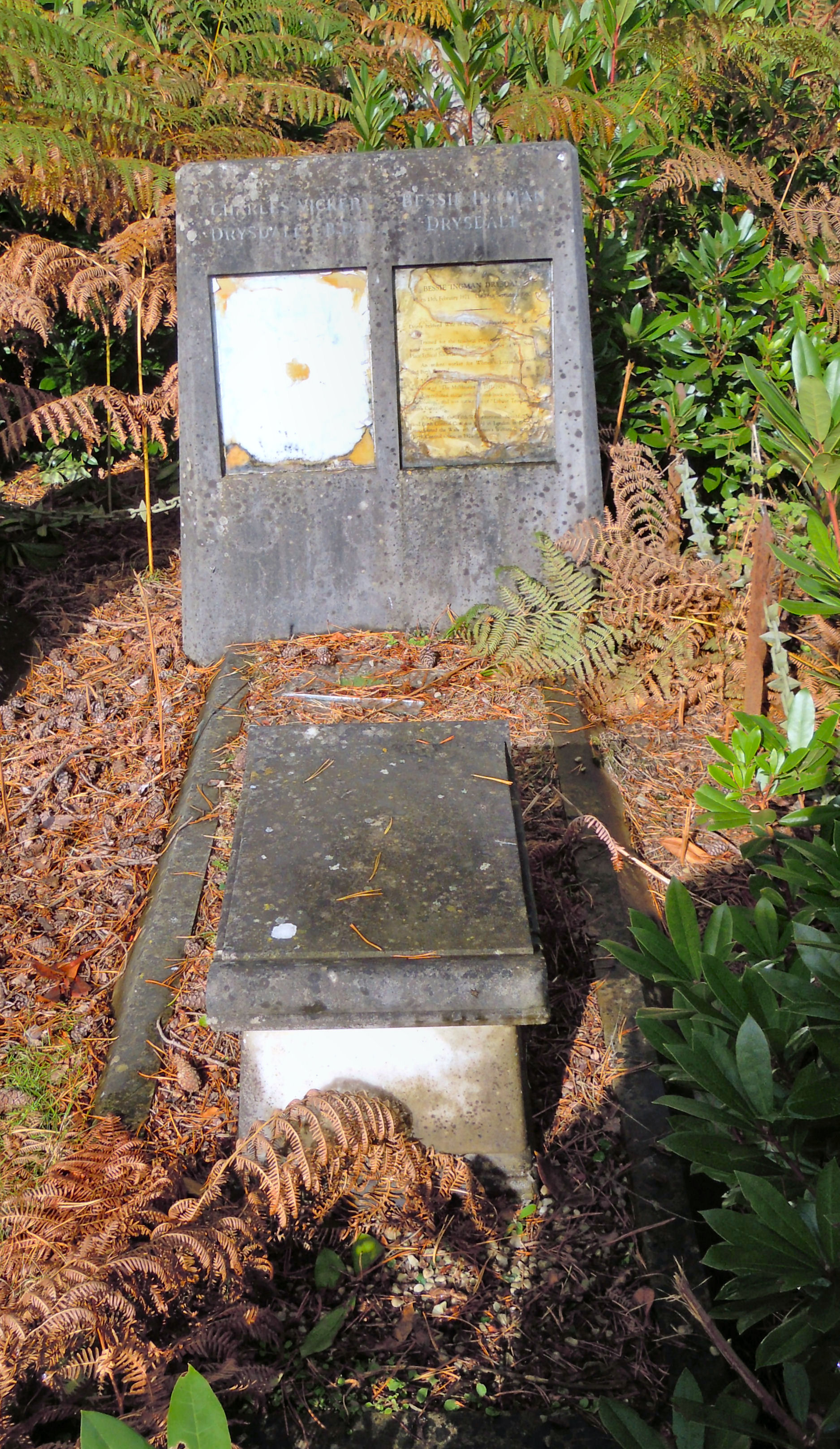
Drysdale's grave in Brookwood Cemetery

He was born the first son of Charles Robert Drysdale and Alice Vickery. He was born in Paris on 8 July 1874 while his mother was studying Medicine there. His uncle was John James Drysdale (1816–1890) founder of the Liverpool Homeopathic Hospital.

He was privately tutored then sent to Finsbury Technical College to study engineering. He completed his studies at the Central Technical College in South Kensington, where he was awarded the Siemens Medal.

From 1898 he was a member of the Physical Society and oversaw its transition into the Institute of Physics. He served as president of the Optical Society in 1904. Following the death of his father in 1907 he became Secretary of the Malthusian League and served as its president 1912 until 1952 (its demise). In 1914 he met Margaret Sanger who became a strong influence on his views. In both 1921 and 1925 he served as President of the Neo-Malthusian International Conference (London, 1921: New York, 1925). These views led to his involvement in Britain's National Birth Control Association in 1930. In 1907, greatly influenced by his mother's views he founded the Men's League for Women's Suffrage. He also sat on the Men's Committee for Justice for Women. In 1913 he was the first witness to give evidence to the National Birth-Rate Commission.

He was elected a Fellow of the Royal Society of Edinburgh in 1921. His proposers were Charles Glover Barkla, James Robert Milne, Sir Thomas Hudson Beare, Magnus Maclean and Ernest George Coker.

From 1934 to 1936 he was a joint manager of the Royal Institution. He was the Duddell Medalist for 1936.

Following his wife's death he went to live with his nephew at Ashley, Filsham Drive, Pebsham near Bexhill-on-Sea in Sussex and died there on 7 February 1961. He is buried with his wife beside his parents in Brookwood Cemetery.

== Career ==
From 1896 to 1910 he was Head of Electrical Engineering and Applied Physics at the Northampton Institute. From 1916 to 1918 he worked at H Tinsley & Co.

In January 1918 he joined the Admiralty Experimental Station at Parkeston Quay on the Essex coast. Here he developed the "leader cable" system: a ship guidance system where ships attached to an underwater cable. Following the end of the First World War in November he moved with the AES to Shandon on the western Scottish coast. From 1921 to 1929 he acted as Superintendent to the facility, and from 1929 to 1934 was director of the Admiralty Experimental Station in Scotland.

== Recognition ==
A Blue plaque commemorates Britain's second birth control clinic, which Drysdale managed. It stands on 153 East Street, Walworth, Southwark in London.

== Publications ==
See He succeeded his father as editor of The Malthusian from 1907. He also wrote the following books and papers:

- The Foundation of Alternate Current Theory (1910)
- Food Supply at the Electrical Engineer (1914)
- The Small Family System: Is it Injurious or Immoral (1917)
- Small or Large Families (1917) with contributions from Havelock Ellis
- Neo-Malthusianism and Eugenics (1922)
- Electrical Measuring Instruments (1952)
- A Religion for Humanity
- The Malthusian Doctrine and Criterion of Overpopulation
- To All Who Desire Permanent Peace and Prosperity
- Science and Post-War Policy
- Wage-Earners Save Yourselves!

== Family ==
In 1898 he married Bessie Ingman Edwards (1871–1950) a teacher at Stockwell College in South London. They had one daughter who died in 1914 aged 13. They adopted a son.
