= Ladies' Medical College =

Coordinates: 51°31′24″N 0°08′22″W

The Ladies' Medical College (renamed The Obstetrical College for Women) was a short-lived English medical college for women, established in 1864 by the Female Medical Society. It offered courses in midwifery and diseases associated with women and children, but failed to extend its curriculum to the full scope of medical training and closed in 1873.

== Formation ==
The Medical Act 1858, which for the first time regulated the licensing of physicians in the UK and created the Medical Register, effectively barred women from becoming doctors in the UK by requiring physicians to pass examinations offered by any of 19 examination boards, none of which permitted the admission of women. The practice of midwifery was unregulated, and was undertaken either by self-trained working class women, or by male physicians. The male medical establishment, as a rule, opposed encroachment on what it considered to be its territory by women.

Against this backdrop, a Female Medical Society was established in 1862 with a long term aim of enabling women to qualify as doctors, but with a shorter term focus on medicine applicable to women and children. At its outset, the society sought to raise the status of midwifery such that it could be considered a profession for educated women; to respect the feelings of female patients who preferred to be tended by female practitioners; and to save lives, both by the effect of better training and practice, but also by reducing infections introduced by male physicians who in their wider work came into contact with disease, surgery and post-mortems.

In support of its aims, the Society established in 1864 the Ladies' Medical College at premises in Fitzroy Square, London, (Note: Probably at No. 4 Fitzroy Square. James Edmunds is recorded as occupying the premises from 1866–1879, in "Fitzroy Square", Survey of London: Volume 21, the Parish of St Pancras Part 3: Tottenham Court Road and Neighbourhood. Eds. J R Howard Roberts, and Walter H Godfrey. London: London County Council, 1949. pp. 52-63. via British History Online.) initially offering a course in obstetrics and supporting and related subject matter, with a somewhat broader curriculum by 1870. From 1867 students gained clinical experience at the British Lying-In Hospital. 14 students entered in the first year of operation, 69 by 1867 and 84 in 1870. Notable students of the College include Isabel Thorne (who described its teaching as inadequate) and Matilda Chaplin, both of whom went on to be members of the Edinburgh Seven who in 1870 sought to qualify as doctors at the University of Edinburgh; Florence Fenwick Miller who traced the opposite journey, training in Edinburgh in 1871 and then taking a midwifery certificate at the College; and Alice Vickery, first British woman to qualify as a chemist and pharmacist.

== Criticism and ambivalent status ==
The medical profession, in general, reacted very poorly to the College, espousing various grounds in the British Medical Journal (BMJ): that the midwifery role should remain subordinate to the (male) physician; that the college provided a 'dangerously insufficient' training creating 'half-educated' female practitioners; or that the college aimed too high in serving educated women rather than working-class midwives. Feminist journals such as the Alexandra Magazine and English Woman's Journal were more supportive.

That the College's ambitions were limited appears to have limited its life-span. Aspiring female physicians were concerned with access to the acquisition of credentials enabling them to be listed on the Medical Register, and these the College did not offer. As a result, it was not supported by leading campaigners for the medical education of women such as the Edinburgh Seven nor Elizabeth Garrett Anderson. In 1872, the Society renamed it The Obstetrical College for Women' and unsuccessfully sought funds to extend the curriculum offered; the College closed in 1873. Writing in a later period, Ray Strachey noted that the College was "a half-measure'.

A year after the closure, the London School of Medicine for Women (LSMW) - unconnected with the Society and arising out of the experience and reaction to the Edinburgh Seven - opened in 1874 to provide full medical training, and the UK Medical Act 1876 enabled the medical authorities to license all qualified applicants irrespective of gender. The LSMW's success is noted to have overshadowed the Ladies' Medical College in the historical record.
