= Sunday Lecture Society =

The Sunday Lecture Society was a British-based society that gave a number of influential lectures on Sundays. The first incarnation of the society met at St. George's Hall, Langham Place for members to hear lectures on arts, history, science and literature. It was formed in November 1869 by solicitor William Henry Domville. The society came about because during November 1865, the National Sunday League (NSL) held a series of lectures for the general public entitled "Sunday Evenings for the People". This was fiercely opposed by the Lord's Day Observance Society (LDOS), which had the lectures cancelled after only four had been given. This was done by threatening the management of St Martin's Hall with legal action, as lectures on a Sunday were forbidden under the Sunday Observance Act 1780. In the aftermath, it was sometime later that the Sunday Lecture Society was formed, replacing the NSL.

The vice presidents included Thomas Henry Huxley, Herbert Spencer, William Spottiswoode, John Tyndall, and Charles Darwin. Gerald Parsons notes that "Huxley also presided over the organisational meeting, although he declined to serve as president in 1884 while holding the same office in the Royal Society."

The Sunday Lecture Society soon branched out to Tynedale, and established itself in Leeds where it held meetings at the Coliseum Theatre, situated at Cookridge Street. In 1894 the LDOS forced the prosecution of the Leeds branch of the Sunday Lecture Society under the Sunday Observance Act, leading to the fining of two members of the Society, Alderman Ward and Mr. Gavazzi King, as well as the proprietor of the Coliseum, a Mr. Wilson. The Sunday Lecture Society later had this verdict overturned on appeal, and the actions of the LDOS were dismissed with costs. John Wigley, writing about this in his book The rise and fall of the Victorian Sunday, says he considers this to have been a "tactical blunder" because after the prosecution another group, the Sunday Society, formed a National Association of Sunday Societies in order to better defend themselves. Furthermore, the prosecution galvanised one of the Sunday Lecture Society's members, Lord Hobhouse, to put forward a Sunday Bill to the House of Lords, where on its second reading it was put to committee. Wigley says that the Sabbatarians did not "make a good impression, rather letting down their side". Nonetheless, the bill was not enacted, and a second Sunday Bill introduced by Hobhouse in 1897 also failed.

== Lecturers ==
- Eliza Orme
- Anna Kingsford
- George Wotherspoon
- William Benjamin Carpenter
- George Simonds Boulger
- Thomas William Rhys Davids
- Henry Maudsley
- Henry Nottidge Moseley
- George Romanes
- Gustav Zerffi
- William Kingdon Clifford
- John Wentworth
- John Mackinnon Robertson
- Karl Pearson
- John Addington Symonds
- Florence Miller
- Edward Aveling
- Elizabeth Blackwell
