= Nannie Lambert Power O'Donoghue =

Irish writer and equestrian (1843–1940)

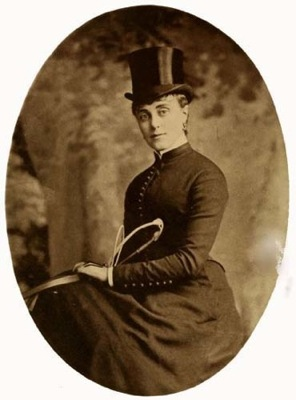
- Nannie Lambert Power O'Donoghue from 'Ladies on Horseback' 1881
- Born: Ann Stewart Lyster Lambert; Dublin
- Baptised: June 2, 1843
- Died: January 12, 1940 (aged 96)
- Occupations: Writer and equestrian
- Notable work: Riding for Ladies

Nannie Lambert Power O'Donoghue, also known as Ann Stewart Lyster Lambert, (2 June 1843, Dublin, Ireland – 12 January 1940, Dublin Ireland) was a writer and equestrian.

She was known for her horse riding, poetry and journalism projects. She was a journalist and wrote pieces and articles concerning social welfare and animals well being. She had written many different books, her most famous; Riding for Ladies (1887) sold more than 94,000 copies. She was also a musician, novelist and social activist.

She lived out her life in the heart of Dublin and from the year she turned 26 years old (1869) she was married to William Power O'Donoghue, a professor of music at the Royal Irish Academy of Music.

== Early life ==
Ann Stewart Lyster Lambert was baptized under the Church of Ireland on 2 June 1843 in the Parish Church of St. Thomas in North Dublin, youngest daughter of Charles and Jane Catherine Lambert (Maiden name Irwin). Her father, Charles Lambert of Athenry, was from a landlord family which originates from County Galway.

Nicknamed 'Nannie' as an endearment to her being the youngest child of the family, Ann had 3 sisters: Lizzie, Jane Catherine and Hannah Elizabeth Ellen, one brother: Charles Edward, and two half-brothers; Arthur Irwin and Robert Henry Downes, from her mother's first marriage to Robert Henry Downes Mahon. Ann grew up in various locations within Dublin first at 5 Cumberland Street, followed by a move to 19 Upper Gloucester Street in 1850 (now Seán McDermott Street) living a comfortable lifestyle thanks to her father's respectable position within the post office. She would also frequently visit Castle Ellen in Athenry, Co. Galway, throughout her youth for family gatherings and holidays, her family having moved from the estate prior to her birth due to the passing of Ann's grandfather in 1836 and the land's inheritance to Charles Lambert's brother the following year.

== Education ==
Nannie Lambert was highly trained in needlework, drawing, household work and cultural fields, such as knowledge in the classics, ability to speak multiple European languages by her twenties, as well as an education in performing as a vocalist, in the pianoforte and the harp. Her writing style in her youth was elegant and old-fashioned even when considered within the standards the 19th century. Nannie never received formal horseriding lessons, but instead managed to negotiate opportunities to practice riding, borrowing saddles etc. She travelled to England to stay with her aunt and uncle, Catherine and Reverend Theophilus Carroll, B.A., MA. During her stay there, she learned to speak Italian and kept company of the daughter of her aunt and uncle.

== Career ==
Nannie Lambert Power O'Donoghue had a professional writing career spanning over five decades. Her writings covered topics such as equestrianism, hunting, music, art, and social issues.

O’Donoghue’s professional career officially began in 1868 with the publication of her book Knave of Clubs; however she didn’t achieve any significant recognition from this first novel. It was in the 1880s that she really started to hit her stride as a writer with the publications of a series of articles in 1881 entitled "Ladies on Horseback". The social acceptance of ladies riding and hunting was on the rise during this time, and O’Donoghue was a prominent figure within these fields; this led to highly positive response to "Ladies on Horseback." In 1884, O’Donoghue published second set of articles in the magazine Lady’s Pictorial, these articles were later in 1987 published in book form in Riding for Ladies. Her book Ladies on Horseback; Learning Park-Riding and Hunting with Hints Upon Costume and Numerous Anecdotes was reported to have sold over 94,000 copies in five languages. During its short two year life, Mrs Power-O'Donoghue wrote a column called "The Ladies' Letter" in The Jarvey, a weekly comic magazine edited by Percy French from January 1889-January 1891. The letter focus on matters domestic, on education and on matters equestrian. When she left the column in March 1890 French thanked her and described her as an "Amazon" but her style surfaced in other gossip columns called 'Fan Lights' and 'Chit Chatters' and she may also have had a hand in a Leader column called 'Pony Leaders,' which may sometimes have been collaborations between her and Ethel French, Percy French's first wife.

At age 37, O'Donoghue suffered a spinal injury from a fall, preventing her from riding again. Following this, she started to branch out towards other writing subjects. She started writing articles and covering such things as shows and race meetings for Lady’s Pictorial. She also started to freelance as a journalist and it wasn’t uncommon for her to write pieces under pen names, continuously branching out and covering more and more topics of writing, such as art critique of plays, exhibitions, and concerts.

Through her writing O’Donoghue tried to initiate social reforms. She often brought up topics that she felt strongly about such as poverty, education for women, and animal abuse. Her humanitarian mindset and writing skill led her to write for the Irish times. She also served as editor for the Irish Society magazine.

O’Donoghue wrote an article about the Easter Rising, which she experienced first hand, devoid of any political expression within the text.

O’Donoghue continued to write professionally well into the 1920s, and her long career made her a prominent and influential figure within Irish literature.

== Family ==
In 1869 she married Professor William Power O'Donoghue.

== Bibliography ==
- The Knave of Clubs: A Novel, London, 1868
- Spring Leaves, London, 1877.
- Ladies on Horseback; Learning Park-riding and Hunting; With Hints upon costume and Numerous Anecdotes, London, W. H. Allen & Co., 1881 and 1891.
- Unfairly Won; A Novel, 3 volumes, London, Chapman and Hall 1882.
- A Beggar on Horseback; A Novel, 3 volumes, London, Hurst and Blackett, 1884.
- The Common Sense of Riding; Riding for Ladies, with Hints on the Stable, London, W. Thacker and Co., 1887 and 1904.
- Rhymes for Readers and Reciters, Dublin, 1895.

== Family tree ==
Her family tree is one that originates from the west of Ireland and was a wealthy Anglo-Irish family with her grandfather Walter Peter Lambert of Castle Ellen, originally from Yorkshire England, owning over three thousand acres of land in Galway when he was alive. Her father, Charles Lambert and mother, Jane Catherine Irwin had three other daughters and a son, as well as her mother having another two sons in her first marriage who would have been her half-brothers, but there is no documentation of them have a relationship with one another. Her family tree was not extended by O’ Donoghue and her husband but there are some notable relations within the family to be recognised such as her cousin being the mother to Edward Carson who was a unionist politician as well as a noted judge and barrister.

  John Lambert of Creg Clare, fl. 1645-after 1669.
 =Redish Lynch, daughter of Thomas Lynch, Mayor of Galway =Mary French
  |                                                            |
  |___________________________                                 |
  |                          |                                 |
  |                          |                                 |
  Mary                       Joseph of Mayo                    Charles Lambert of Creg Clare, k. Derry, 1689.
 =Robert French of Rashane                                    =Janet Taylor of Ballymacragh (Castle Taylor)
                                                               |
                                                               |
                                                        Walter Lambert of Creg Clare
                                                =Miss Hamilton =Sybilla Martyn of Tullira 
                                                |              |
                                                |              |__________________________________________
                                                |              |      |               |        |         |
                                                |              |      |               |        |         |
                                                Charles       John  Peter, d. 1836. Thomas   Belinda   Ms. Lambert
                                                                   =Miss Carrol of Ardagh
                                                                    |
                                        ____________________________|______________
                                        |                                         |
                                        |                                         |
                                        Walter Peter Lambert of Castle Ellen.     Sabina Lambert
                                        =Ellen Tubbs                              =Thomas Mahon of Belleville, Co. Galway.
                                        |
                                        |__________________________________________
                                        |                                         | 
                                        |                                         |
                                        Peter, 1785-1844.                         Charles, b. 1804.
                                        =Eleanor Seymour =Maria Louisa Caroll     =Jane Catherine Irwin of Oakfield, County Sligo.
                                        |                      |                                        |
                                        |                      |                                        |
                                        Isabella               Louisa Maria, 1837-1904                  Nannie, 1843–1940
                                        =Edward Henry Carson   =Henry Jenkins Stavely Bowdler           =William Power O'Donoghue
                                        |
                                        |
                                        Edward Carson
