= Female Medical Society =

The Female Medical Society was a British social organisation established in 1862 to promote the employment of women to treat women and children, and to act as midwives. Under its aegis, the first medical college for women, the Ladies' Medical College was founded in 1864, albeit with limited aims and a short life-span.

== Formation ==
The society was established at a time when women were effectively barred from becoming doctors in the UK by the Medical Act 1858, which required physicians to pass examinations offered by any of 19 examination boards, none of which permitted the admission of women. The practice of midwifery was unregulated, and was undertaken either by self-trained working-class women, or by male physicians. The male medical establishment, as a rule, opposed encroachment on what it considered to be its territory by women.

The society was established by James Edmunds, a physician at the British Lying-In Hospital in Holburn, and the social reformer Anthony Ashley-Cooper, 7th Earl of Shaftesbury acted as its first president. Patrons included the rising Frederick Temple Blackwood, Henry Edward Manning, George Campbell, 8th Duke of Argyll and Elizabeth Campbell, Duchess of Argyll, and Catherine Gladstone, wife of the then Chancellor of the Exchequer. Professionals who lent support included physicians serving at a number of London hospitals, and William Buchanan, a former master of the Worshipful Society of Apothecaries.

Concerns providing the impetus for the foundation of the society included a desire to raise the status of midwifery such that it could be considered a profession for educated women; to respect the feelings of female patients who preferred to be tended by female practitioners; and to save lives, both by the effect of better training and practice, but also by reducing infections introduced by male physicians who in their wider work came into contact with disease, surgery and post-mortems.

== Ladies' Medical College ==
In 1864, the society founded the Ladies' Medical College, initially offering a course in obstetrics and supporting and related subject matter, with a somewhat broader curriculum by 1870. From 1867 students gained clinical experience at the British Lying-In Hospital. 14 students entered in the first year of operation, 69 by 1867 and 84 in 1870.

The medical profession, in general, reacted very poorly to the college, espousing various grounds in the British Medical Journal: that the midwifery role should remain subordinate to the (male) physician; that despite its name, the college provided an insufficient education; or that the colleges aims were too high. Feminist journals such as the Alexandra Magazine and Englishwoman’s Journal were more supportive.

That the college's ambitions were limited appears to have limited its life-span. Aspiring female physicians were concerned with access to the acquisition of credentials enabling them to be listed on the Medical Register, and these the college did not offer. In 1872, the society unsuccessfully sought funds to extend the curriculum offered at the college, at the same time renaming it The Obstetrical College for Women' and in 1873 the college closed.

== Position on medical degrees for women ==
The society appears to have been divided within itself on the question of the admission of women to medical degrees. On the face of it, full admission of women was a stated goal of the society as late as its 6th annual meeting. Equally, James Edmunds spoke against the proposition three years earlier, and the society's main instrument, the college, was deliberately limited in its scope.

The society pursued a half-way house, lobbying Parliament for the extension of the Medical Register to cover "Licentiates in Midwifery", and to this end issued its own certificates in midwifery training.

== Closure ==
The society closed in 1869, partly from lack of funds, and partly because it had lost the support of women wishing for a full and complete training curriculum.

A year after the closure of the society's college, the London School of Medicine for Women – unconnected with the society and arising out of the experience and reaction to the Edinburgh Seven – opened in 1874 to provide full medical training, and the Medical Act 1876 enabled the medical authorities to license all qualified applicants irrespective of gender.
