= British Lying-In Hospital =

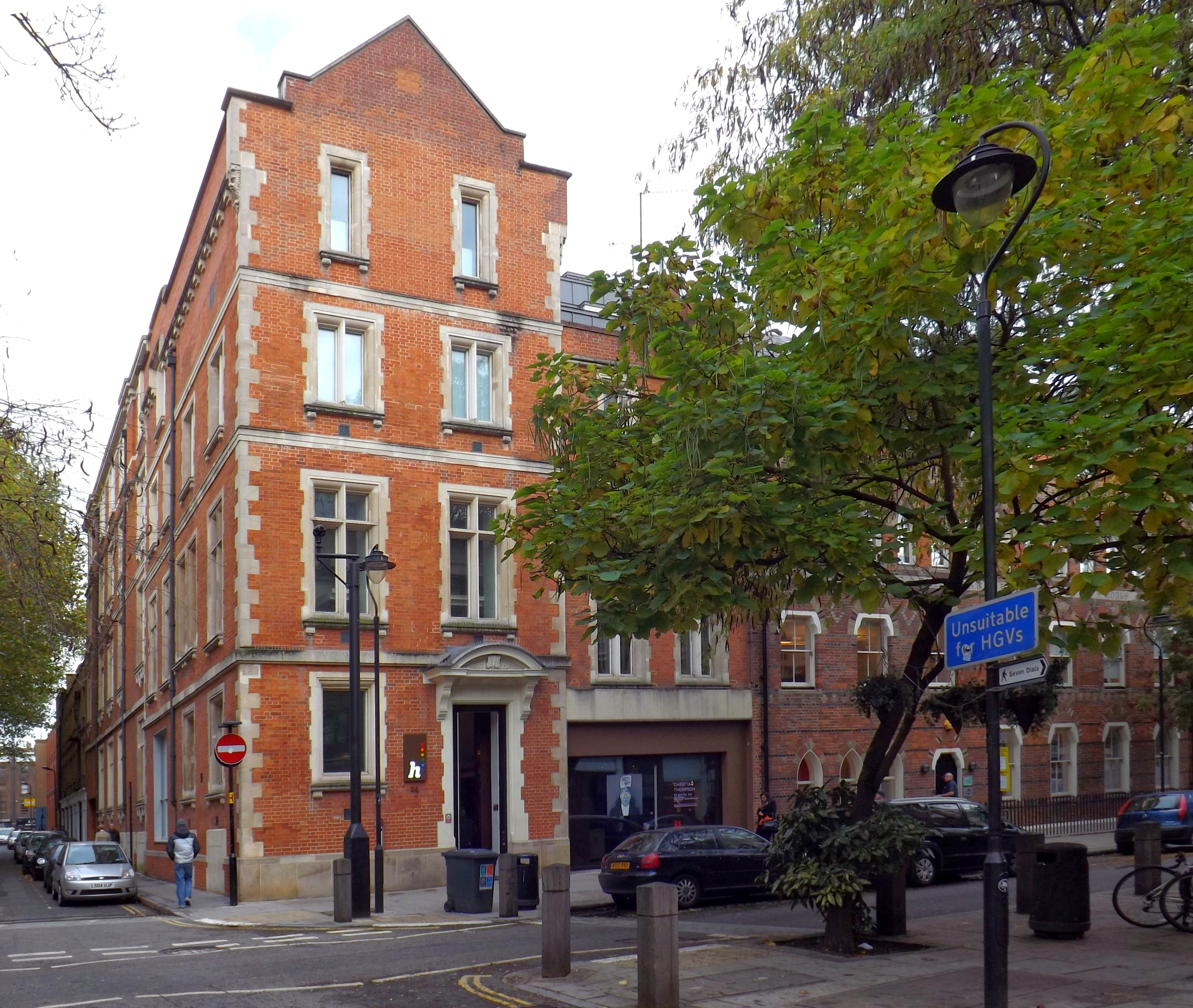
- The 1849 British Lying-In Hospital building in Endell Street, photographed in 2013

- Location within Westminster

Geography
- Location: Brownlow Street and later Endell Street, Holborn, London, England, United Kingdom
- Coordinates: 51.51485°N 0.12479°W

Organisation
- Type: Maternity

Services
- Beds: 20, later 40

History
- Founded: 1749, moved 1849
- Closed: 1913

Links
- Lists: Hospitals in England

The British Lying-In Hospital was a maternity hospital established in London in 1749, the second such foundation in the capital.

== Background ==
The impetus for the creation of a dedicated maternity hospital was dissatisfaction on the part of the governors of the Middlesex Hospital with its maternity facilities. A new hospital with 20 beds was established in 1749 in Brownlow Street, Long Acre, Holborn, under the presidency of the 2nd Duke of Portland, and initially called the Lying-In Hospital for Married Women. ("Lying-in" is an archaic term for childbirth, referring to the long bedrest prescribed for new mothers in their postpartum confinement.) Consequent on the establishment of the City of London Lying-In Hospital for Married Women in 1750, and the General Lying-In Hospital (later renamed the Queen Charlotte's Hospital) in 1752, the Holborn hospital changed its name to the British Lying-In Hospital for Married Women in 1856.

== Early years ==
The hospital was funded by voluntary subscriptions and donations. At the outset, the hospital provided only for in-patients, but by 1828 extended to an out-patient service, supervising home deliveries. In the 1870s, it was treating about 750 in-patients per annum.

The creation of the hospital was not without controversy at the time, and the nature, characteristics and effects of the British in particular, and maternity hospitals in general, continue to be a subject of study. Prior to the hospital's creation, childbirth was for the most-part a domestic affair relying on the good offices of largely untrained (if well-experienced) midwives (traditional birth attendant); only the rich were served by male physicians. The British Lying-In Hospital offered — to married women only — a largely female-only space removed from the home in which childbirth was supervised almost exclusively by female midwives under the supervision of female matrons. The intervention of male physicians was a rare event.

The hospital was attacked within the first two years of operation by Frank Nicholls, a prominent physician who issued, anonymously, a satirical essay, the Petition of the Unborn Babes, which raised a number of concerns questioning the involvement of (allegedly brutal) men-midwives, and asserting high mother and baby mortality rates. Nicholls's publication can be seen to set the tone for much of the subsequent discussion of maternity hospitals to this day. A Vindication of Man Midwifery (1752) attempted a positive spin, but the debate about Man Midwifery and the use of forceps raged for at least the next century.

== Victorian era ==
It moved to a new purpose-built building with 40 beds in Endell Street, in 1849.

The gender separation of roles at the British was called into question from 1862 when the then physician-in-residence, James Edmunds, established with other the Female Medical Society, and in 1864 when the Ladies' Medical College was established to train women in midwifery and obstetrics. From 1867, its students gained clinical experience at the British - albeit the nature of Edmunds's innovation led to disputes amongst the governing board and unsuccessful effort to unseat him.

A note in Old and New London: Volume 3 states that the hospital had by 1874 treated 47,000 in-patients.

== Merger and re-invention ==
The British Lying-In Hospital closed in May 1913 in anticipation of its amalgamation with the Home for Mothers and Babies and Training School for District Midwives in January 1915. The newly amalgamated establishment was called the British Hospital for Mothers and Babies.

The National Archives hold records of births and baptisms at the hospital in the period 1749–1868, and the London Metropolitan Archives holds a wealth of organisational records.
