= Gustav Zerffi =

George Gustav (or Gustavus) Zerffi, born with the surname Cerf or perhaps Hirsch (21 May 1820 – January 28, 1892) was a journalist, revolutionist and spy.

== Biography ==
Born in Hungary, Zerffi was educated in Budapest. He became a journalist at the age of eighteen. He was the author of Wiener Lichtbilder und Schattenspiele, with twelve caricatures (Vienna, 1848); and as editor of the liberal Der Ungar (Reform) in 1848, he became conspicuous by his attacks upon the Germans and the imperial family.

With Csernatoni, Stancsits, Zanetti, Steinitz, and others he set the tone for the revolutionists, and in 1848 he was József Schweidel's captain and adjutant in the Honvéd army. He also acted for a time as Kossuth's private secretary. On the failure of the revolution he fled to Belgrade (1849) where he entered the service of the French consul. By this time, however, he had become a member of the Austrian secret service, reporting on Hungarian émigré activities (and even other groups of revolutionary exiles) for the Habsburg Ministry of the Interior until 1865.

In 1850 he translated Kossuth's complete works into German for the Europäische Bibliothek der Neuen Belletristischen Litteratur (cccxxii., cccxlvii., cccxlix.), and two years later he visited Paris, going in 1853 to London, where he became a member of the Medical royal college, and afterward secretary of the German National Association. He resigned this post under suspicion, however, although he remained in London. He published an English version of Goethe's Faust with critical and explanatory notes (1859). He became a citizen of Great Britain.

In 1868 he was appointed a lecturer in art history at the National Art Training School in South Kensington, later known as the Royal College of Art. Throughout his career Zerffi gave much attention to the subjects of decoration and history and he asserted that history should be studied as a whole on philosophical principles. He published the popular Manual of the Historical Development of Art (1876), and later more general historical works (The Science of History, 1879; Studies in the Science of General History, 1887-9; and Evolution in History, Language and Science) which were modelled on Hegel, Gobineau and Taine. Yet Zerffi was also a racist and his racism impacted on his understanding of art and broader culture. He wrote that the “Negro’s reasoning faculty is very limited and his imagination slow. He cannot create beauty, for he is indifferent to any ideal conception. He possesses only 75-83% cubic inches of brain." In contrast to this he considered white men to be “the crowningproduct of the cosmical forces of nature” claiming that "To him exclusively we owe art in its highest sense."

According to Joseph McCabe, he gave "agnostic and strongly worded" Rationalist lectures to the London Sunday Lecture Society: his published efforts in this direction included Natural Phenomena and their Influence on Different Religious Systems (1873); Dogma and Science (1876); and The Spontaneous Dissolution of Ancient Creeds (1876).
