= Charles Robert Drysdale =

British physician and public health scientist (1829–1907)

- Born: 1829
- Died: 2 December 1907; West Dulwich, London, England
- Occupation(s): Physician, writer

Charles Robert Drysdale (1829 – 2 December 1907) was an English engineer, physician, public health scientist, and supporter of birth control. He was the first President of the Malthusian League and he published books on a variety of topics including population control, syphilis, the evils of prostitution and the dangers of tobacco smoking.

== Life and career ==
He was the son of William Drysdale (1781–1847) and Lady Elizabeth Drysdale. The family were close friends of Charles Darwin. His elder brothers included Dr John James Drysdale (1816–1890) founder of the Liverpool Homeopathic Hospital, and George Drysdale (1824-1904), an advocate of contraception.

Drysdale was educated at University College London. He obtained his M.R.C.S. in 1858 and took his M.D. in 1859, F.R.C.S. in 1861 and M.R.C.P. in 1862.

Although later remembered only as a doctor he was initially a trained and skilled engineer, working on the SS Great Eastern for Brunel in 1847 and conducting surveys for new railways in both Spain and Switzerland.

Together with his partner, Alice Vickery, he founded the Malthusian League and was its first President. The League, which was established in July 1877, advocated the practice of contraception and the education of the public about the importance of family planning; it was founded on the principle that over-population was the chief cause of poverty. Drysdale's 1878 book, The Population Question, according to T. R. Malthus and J. S. Mill, giving the Malthusian theory of over population, outlines his thinking on these matters. Drysdale was also an active member and treasurer of the London Dialectical Society, at which he spoke on subjects such as over-population and public health.

Drysdale and Vickery were witnesses for the defence of Charles Bradlaugh and Annie Besant during their 1877 trial concerning the publication of the Knowlton pamphlet Fruits of Philosophy (which advocated birth control).

Drysdale died on 2 December 1907 in West Dulwich.

== Campaign against tobacco smoking ==
Drysdale was one of the earliest campaigners against tobacco smoking. In a letter to The Times newspaper in 1878 to say 'I think that the use of tobacco is one of the most evident of all the retrograde influences of our time.' and 'The use of tobacco is one of the most evident of all the retrograde influences of our time. It invades all classes, destroys social life, and is turning, in the words of Mantegazza, the whole of Europe into a cigar divan.'

== Criticism of vegetarianism ==
Drysdale argued that a mixed-diet is best for mankind and was an opponent of vegetarianism. In 1891, Drysdale wrote an article, "Fallacies of Vegetarianism" for The Sanitary Inspector journal. He utilized arguments from anatomy, chemistry and physiology against vegetarianism. Vegetarians rejected his anatomical argument.

== Family ==
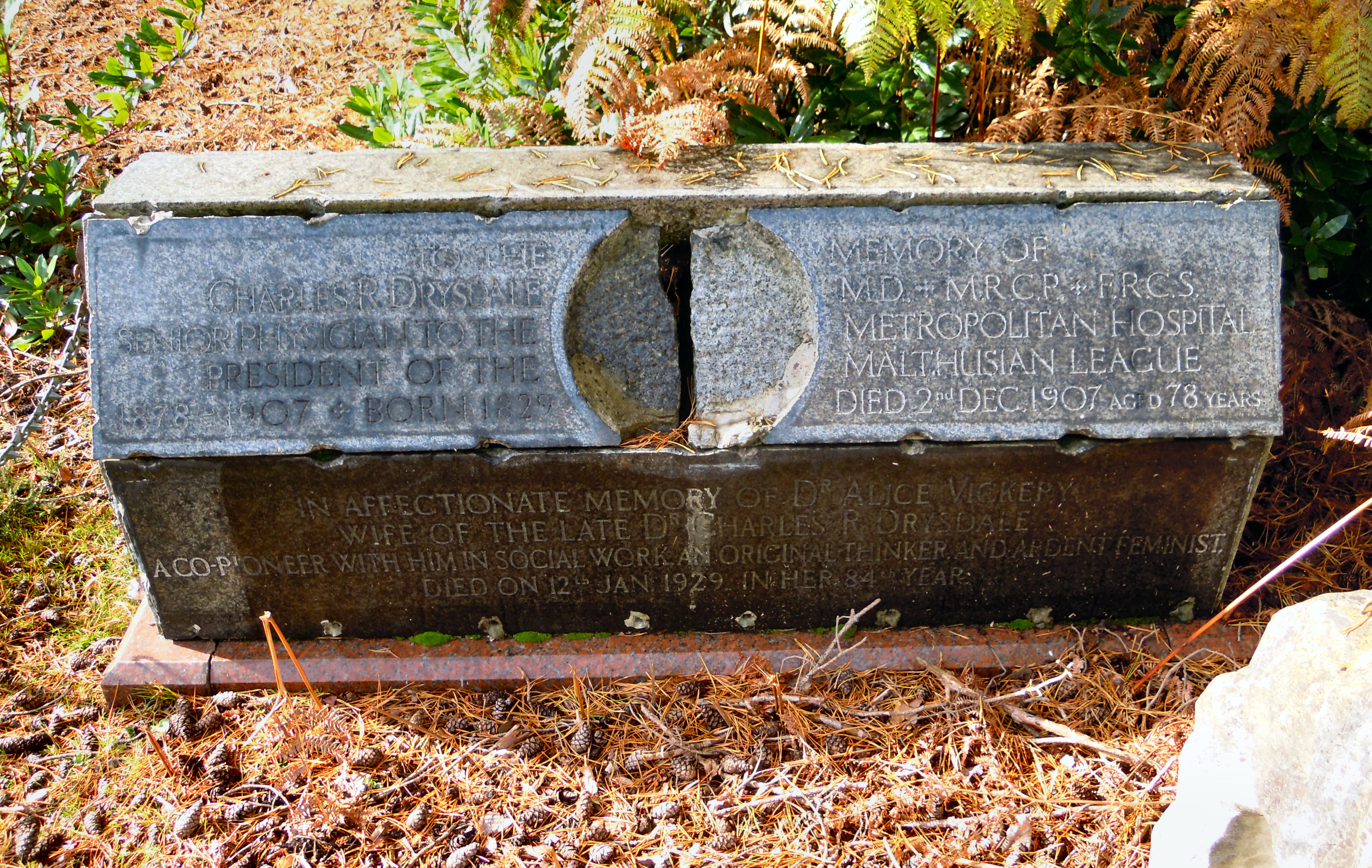
Drysdale's grave in Brookwood Cemetery

In 1869, he began a life-long relationship with fellow doctor and campaigner Alice Vickery. Neither believed in marriage, preferring instead to live in a free union, although many contemporaries assumed that they were husband and wife. They are buried together in Brookwood Cemetery.

Their son, Charles Vickery Drysdale (1874–1961) opened one of the first family planning clinics at East Street, Walworth, London SE17 in 1921. A Blue plaque marks the site.

== Selected publications ==
- Prostitution Medically Considered (1866)
- Tobacco and the Diseases it Produces (1875)
- The Population Question (1878)
- Fallacies of Vegetarianism (1891)
- The Life and Writings of Thomas R. Malthus (1892)
