= Florence Miller (writer) =

English journalist, author, and social reformer

Florence Fenwick Miller
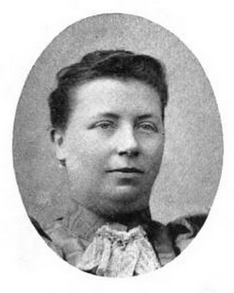
- Born: 1854; Stepney
- Died: 1935 (aged 80–81); Hove, Sussex
- Occupations: suffragist; journalist; writer; public speaker; physician

Florence Fenwick Miller (sometimes Fenwick-Miller, 5 November 1854 – 24 April 1935) was an English journalist, author and social reformer of the late 19th and early 20th century. She was for four years the editor and proprietor of The Woman's Signal, an early and influential feminist journal.

== Early life and education ==
Florence Fenwick Miller was born in Stepney, the eldest daughter of John Miller, a merchant sea-captain, and of Eleanor Estabrook Miller, daughter of a railway engineer. Miller was named after Florence Nightingale. Privately educated as a child, she read for a medical degree at the University of Edinburgh from 1871, in the year following the Edinburgh Seven, the first females to be admitted to the course. Like the Seven, she was unable to pursue clinical practise and Edinburgh declined to award a degree to her. Edinburgh University had decided against awarding medical degrees to women. In 1873, she took a midwifery certificate at the Ladies' Medical College in London.

== Career ==
Despite her training, Miller quickly moved away from medical practice towards wider spheres. She quickly established herself as a lecturer on literary and social reform topics, debating in London at the Sunday Lecture Society, appearing before the London Dialectical Society (which was engaged in investigating the phenomenon of Spiritualism; James Edmunds, the founder of the Ladies' Medical College was a committee member); and giving talks throughout the country. She was an early and vocal advocate of women's suffrage and, later, in 1889, was one of the founders, with Emmeline Pankhurst, of the Women's Franchise League.

Miller also wrote, as journalist and author of fiction and non-fiction. In the former capacity she contributed very widely, including to Fraser's Magazine, Lett's Illustrated Household Magazine, Belgravia, and The Governess, the Lady's Pictorial, The Woman's World, the Young Woman, and The Echo. She was for 32 years, from 1886, the 'Ladies' Notes' columnist for the Illustrated London News. Progressing in her career, she was from 1892 editor of two magazines for colonists, Outward Bound and Homeward Bound. In 1895 she assumed control of and edited The Woman's Signal, until 1899 a leading feminist publication. She later wrote for the Daily News.

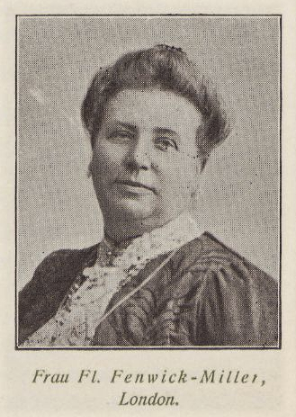
Florence Fenwick-Miller, c.1904

Her output as an author was wide: making use of her medical training, she published from 1878 onwards several books on anatomy, including contributing two books to the Hughes's Natural History Readers series. In 1879 she published a three volume fiction, Lynton Abbott's Children; in 1883 a book on Social Economy, and in 1884 a biography of the writer Harriet Martineau.

After she took over ‘Women’s Signal’ as editor, Florence Fenwick Miller changed the publications tagline to “A Weekly Record and Review devoted to the Interests of Women in the Home and in the Wider World.” This therefore allowed Miller to publish information about fashion, motherhood and the home whilst not sacrificing her passion of educating and informing women about the ”progress in the cause of the equal rights and the general advancement of women”.

Miller also engaged herself more directly in social reform. She was elected as a Liberal to the Hackney division of the London School Board in 1876 at the comparatively young age of 22, and held office from 1877–1885. Frederick Rogers, a fellow board member, describes her:

Young, good-looking, brilliant and daring enough to talk frankly on public platforms on matters relating to physiology - it required a tremendous courage to do this in the seventies - and very much of a demogogue, Mrs. Miller in those days enjoyed a popularity which whilst it lasted, was one of the most remarkable incidents of the time. The Commonwealth Club in Bethnal Green was packed to suffocation when she lectured on physiology.

Like her predecessor Elizabeth Garrett Anderson, Fenwick Miller served whilst getting married and went further to also go through pregnancy and child birth as an elected member.

Helen Taylor, Elizabeth Surr and Miller brought to public notice in 1882 certain scandals at St. Paul's Industrial School. The home secretary instituted an inquiry, and the school was ordered to be closed. In June 1882, Thomas Scrutton, a member of the school board and chairman of its industrial schools sub-committee, brought an action for libel against Taylor.

She spoke widely on women's suffrage, later in her career acting as an international delegate, notably visiting Chicago in 1893 for the World's Columbian Exposition and the World's Congress of Representative Women; and again in 1902 as part of the International Council of Women. Her international links brought her into association with leading American suffragists. She resigned from the International Women's Suffrage Committee in 1904.

Florence Fenwick Miller dedicated much of her life to the Women’s suffrage Movement. In 1883 she headed a meeting on what was later known as the “New Reform Bill”. This allowed women to the Parliamentary franchise of the same terms as men. Fenwick Miller gave five lectures all titled, ‘Women’s Work in the World” given in July and August 1883. In the Autumn of that same year she gave further talks, namely “Women and The New Reform Bill’

== Personal life ==
Miller made an unsuccessful marriage with Frederick Alfred Ford; they had two daughters, Irene (who became a WSPU activist, leading direct action, and was imprisoned several times) and Helen, but separated. L. A. Flammang, in a review of a biography of Miller, notes that Ford contributed little to the family and suggests that, in part, the volume of Miller's output was related to her straitened economic circumstances. Miller continued to use her own name after the marriage (Frederick Rogers noting that she changed it from Miss Fenwick Miller to Mrs. Fenwick Miller), leading to litigation seeking to remove her from her London School Board office for sitting under an illegal name: Miller prevailed, and the case established the precedent that women need not take the surname of their husband. Litigation happened with respect to the school boards.

Miller died on 24 April 1935 in Hove, Sussex. A biography, Florence Fenwick Miller: Victorian Feminist, Journalist and Educator written by Rosemary T. Van Arsdel, was published by Ashgate Publishing in 2001.

== Works ==
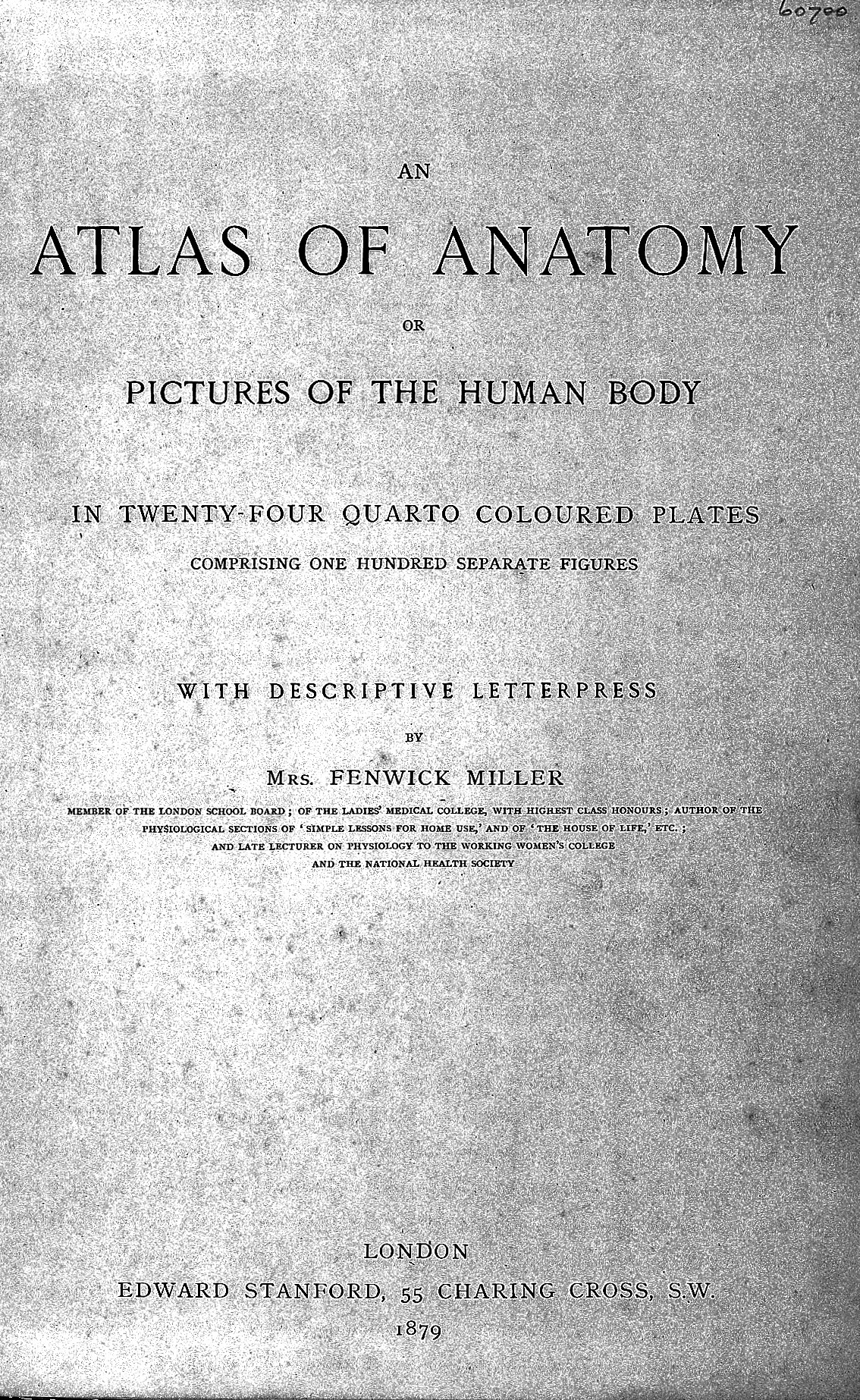
An atlas of anatomy

- Anatomy
  - The House of Life (1878)
  - An Atlas of Anatomy (1879)
  - Animal Physiology for Elementary Schools (1882)
- Social reform
  - Readings in Social Economy (1883)
  - On the Programme of the Women's Franchise League, An Address Delivered at the National Liberal Club, Feb. 25, 1890 (1890)
- Biography
  - The Lessons of a Life: Harriet Martineau. A Lecture, Etc (1877)
  - Harriet Martineau (1884)
- Fiction
  - Lynton Abbott's Children (1879, 3 volumes)
