= The Woman's Signal =

Defunct British feminist weekly magazine

The Woman's Signal was a weekly British feminist magazine published by Marshall & Son, London, from 4 January 1894 to 23 March 1899.

The magazine was edited by Lady Henry Somerset, Annie Holdsworth and Florence Fenwick-Miller. Although primarily a temperance paper, it dealt with several feminist issues including fair wages. It began life as The Women's Penny Paper (27 October 1888 – 27 December 1890), edited by Helena B Temple (Henrietta Müller), later becoming The Woman's Herald (3 January 1891 – 28 December 1893). In 1892, Mrs Frank Morrison became editor, followed by Christina Bremner, then by Lady Henry Somerset in 1893. It was bought out by Lady Henry and renamed The Woman's Signal. Florence Fenwick-Miller bought the paper in 1895 and was the editor and sole proprietor until its demise in 1899.
