= The Sketch =

British weekly journal (1893–1959)

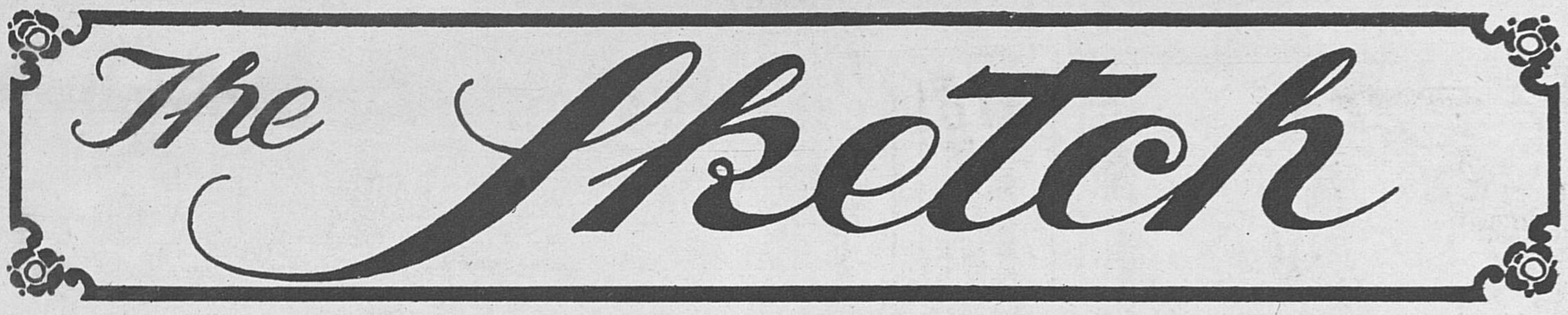

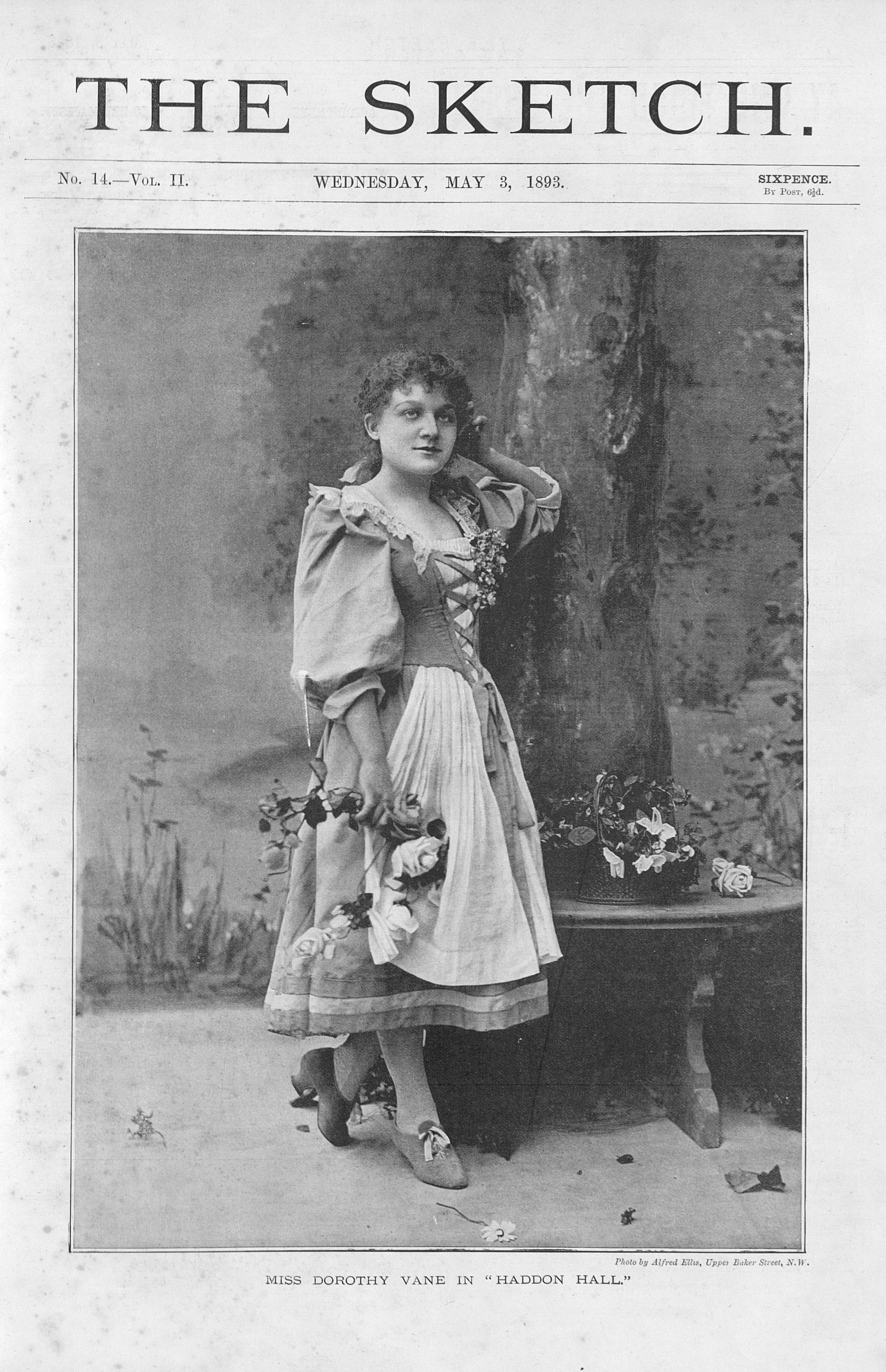
- Title page featuring a portrait by Alfred Ellis of a cast member of Haddon Hall from 1893, Vol.14, №2. British Newspaper Archive
- Publisher: Illustrated London News Company
- Founded: February 1, 1893
- Ceased publication: June 17, 1959
- Language: English
- City: London
- Sister newspapers: Illustrated London News

The Sketch was a British illustrated weekly journal. It ran for 2,989 issues between 1 February 1893 and 17 June 1959. It was published by the Illustrated London News Company and was primarily a society magazine with regular features on royalty, aristocracy and high society, as well as theatre, cinema and the arts. It had a high photographic content with many studies of society ladies and their children as well as regular layouts of point to point racing meetings and similar events.

Clement Shorter and William Ingram started The Sketch in 1893. Shorter was the first editor, from 1893 to 1900, succeeded by John Latey (until his death in 1902) and then Keble Howard. Bruce Ingram was editor from 1905 to 1946.

The magazine is remembered for first publishing the illustrations of Bonzo the dog by George E. Studdy (from 1921). It featured series of short stories within its pages, one per issue, with authors such as Walter de la Mare and Algernon Blackwood. Under the editorship of Bruce Ingram, it was also the first magazine to publish short stories by Agatha Christie, starting with "The Affair at the Victory Ball" in issue 1571 on 7 March 1923. Altogether, Christie wrote 49 stories for The Sketch between 1923 and 1924 (just under a third of her total output of short stories) which were later collected into some or all of the contents of the volumes Poirot Investigates (1924), The Big Four (1927), Partners in Crime (1929), Poirot's Early Cases (1974), and While the Light Lasts and Other Stories (1997). Christie dedicated the 1953 novel A Pocket Full of Rye to Ingram.

The Sketch printed photographs by Howard Coster, and illustrations by H. M. Bateman, Max Beerbohm, Edmund Blampied, Percy Venner Bradshaw (1877–1965), Thomas Arthur Browne, Hilda Cowham, Annie Fish, John Hargrave, John Hassall, Phil May, Bernard Partridge, Melton Prior, W. Heath Robinson, Josep Segrelles, Sidney Sime, Olive Snell, Bert Thomas, and Thomas Downey.

Writers included Carleton Allen, Lucie Armstrong, Nora Hopper, William Robertson Nicoll and John Courtenay Trewin. Keble Howard, editor until 1905, continued to contribute a column titled Motley Notes until two-weeks prior to his death, his final piece appearing on 14 March 1928.

The British Library holds a complete run of The Sketch.
