= Free union =

Romantic relationship without official recognition

The Purple Möbius symbol for polyamory and non-monogamy

A free union is a romantic union between two or more persons without legal or religious recognition or regulation.

The term has been used since the late 19th century to describe a relationship into which all parties enter, remain, and depart freely. The free union is an alternative to, or rejection or criticism of marriage, sometimes due to viewing it as a form of slavery and human ownership, particularly for women. According to this concept, the free union of adults is a legitimate relationship that should be respected. A free union is made between two individuals, but each individual may have several unions of their own.

== History ==
The "love outside the box" symbol for polyamory and non-monogamy

Much of the contemporary tradition of free union under natural law or common law comes from anarchist rejection of marriage, seeking non-interference of either church or state in human relations.

Leaving behind what was seen as law imposed by man in favor of natural law began during the late Enlightenment, when many sought to rethink the laws of property, family, and the status of women. Utopian socialist Robert Owen (1771–1858), who decried marriage as principally linked to the principle of ownership, offers a foretaste of the free union by use of the term "marriage contract in front of nature." Philosopher and feminist Mary Wollstonecraft (1759–1797) stated, "Marriage is an affirmation of the supremacy of man over woman [...] if I love a man, I want to love him while keeping my freedom." In the 1882, Élisée Reclus initiated the Anti-Marriage Movement, in accordance with which he and his partner allowed their two daughters to marry without any civil or religious ceremony, despite public and legal condemnation. Reclus had four partners throughout his lifetime, each with a different social contract.

In more modern times, free unions were common among members of the Spanish anarchist CNT political party during the popular revolution that ran alongside the Spanish Civil War. The couple desiring contractual validation of their relationship would simple go to the Party Headquarters and request the forms, which would be destroyed if the relationship were to not work out. The couple however, were strongly encouraged to make it work, as separation created administrative work for the party.

Additionally, many leading 20th Century intellectuals, including James Joyce, Pablo Picasso, Jean-Paul Sartre, and Simone de Beauvoir never chose to marry, or delayed it until the end of life for legal reasons. De Beauvoir said of the institution, "When we abolish the slavery of half of humanity, together with the whole system of hypocrisy that it implies, then the 'division' of humanity will reveal its genuine significance and the human couple will find its true form."

== Contemporary law ==
In French law, the union libre is an agreement between adults which grants rights between parents and potential children, but holds no obligation of sexual fidelity, nor does it grant reciprocal duties and rights between partners.

A free union can be between individuals of any gender, and an individual may have several concurrently, therefore making free union an option for LGBTQ or polyamorous relationships, as well as heterosexual and/or monogamous ones that do not wish to enter the contract of marriage for historical, social, or financial reasons.

United States law has no exact legal equivalent of a free union, although comparisons are often made to common law marriage. In the United States, partners wishing to have legal rights without entering into a marriage contract may choose to complete documents such as a healthcare proxy, domestic partnership agreement, will, and power of attorney. Members of a free union may refer to each other as partners, spouses, or any other title, but may find themselves subject to the laws of common law marriage if they consistently refer to themselves as husband and wife according to their local jurisdiction.

== Catholic criticism ==
According to the Catholic Church, the expression "free union" includes situations such as concubinage, rejection of marriage as such, or inability to make long-term commitments. According to the Catechism of the Catholic Church, being in a "free union" is a grave offense against the dignity of marriage, which it sees as a Sacrament. However, proponents maintain that the free union acts as a public recognition of a relationship without the obligations of church or state.

== See also ==
- Self-uniting marriage
- Domestic partnership
- Civil union
- Criticism of marriage
- Anarchism and issues related to love and sex
- Gandharva marriage
- Cohabitation
- Common-law marriage
- Free love
- Intimate relationship
- Open relationship
- Polyamory
