= Anne MacGregor =

British doctor

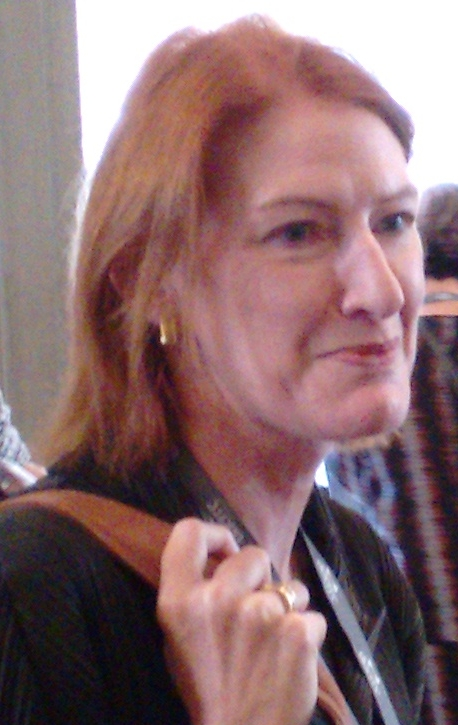
- MacGregor at the European Headache Foundation meeting in September 2018
- Born: New Zealand
- Education: St Bartholomew's Hospital
- Known for: Research on hormonal effects on migraine
- Medical career
- Profession: Physician
- Institutions: Barts Health NHS Trust Barts and The London School of Medicine and Dentistry 10 Harley Street London W1G 9PF
- Awards: Elizabeth Garrett Anderson Award 2002

Anne MacGregor is a New Zealand-born British medical researcher and clinician based in London. She is a leading researcher in the field of hormonal effects on migraine.

== Education ==
MacGregor received her MB BS from St Bartholomew's Hospital in London in 1986. She began training in headache medicine, noticing an important link between the menstrual cycle and migraine. To further this interest, MacGregor attained additional training and earned membership into the Faculty of Sexual and Reproductive Healthcare. She also earned a Doctorate in Medicine (MD) from the University of London and a Masters in Medical Education (MSc MedED) from the Royal College of Physicians and University College London. MacGregor's MD thesis discussed the role of estrogen in menstrual migraine.

== Career ==
She is currently Honorary Professor at the Centre for Neuroscience, Surgery and Trauma within the Blizard Institute of Cell and Molecular Science Barts and The London School of Medicine and Dentistry and Associate Specialist in Sexual and Reproductive Healthcare at Barts Health NHS Trust, London. She also has a busy private practice.

Between January 1988 and July 2011 MacGregor worked at the City of London Migraine Clinic (now the National Migraine Centre), initially training under the neurologists Dr Marcia Wilkinson and Dr Nat Blau. In 1999, she became Director of Clinical Research and joined the Board of Directors as Vice Chairman. She was actively involved with the other headache charities, serving as a trustee of the Migraine Trust and member of the Medical Advisory Board of Migraine Action Association. She has served on the Executive Boards of the British Association for the Study of Headache and the Anglo-Dutch Migraine Association. For almost a decade she was on the Board of Directors of the International Headache Society, serving first as Honorary General Secretary and later as Honorary Treasurer. She was an assistant editor of Cephalagia between 1989 and 1992. In 2002 she received the Elizabeth Garrett Anderson Award, which was awarded by the World Headache Alliance to a woman who has "made an extraordinary contribution toward relieving the burden of headaches on those affected".

In addition to her work in headache, MacGregor is active in the field of education and also sexual and reproductive healthcare. She was joint Vice Chair of the Examination Committee and Convener of the critical reading question group for the MFSRH, General Training Programme Director for Barts Health NHS Trust and member of the FSRH eKA review group. She is a certified trainer in SRH and Menopause Care has been a member of the Medical Advisory Committee of the British Menopause Society since 2017.

She writes for and lectures to healthcare professionals and lay groups both nationally and internationally and appears on radio and television. She has published over 200 research papers and book chapters, five single author books, co-authored seven books and co-edited three books. She was an expert advisor for the NICE headache guidelines and was a co-author of first to third editions of the British Association for the Study of Headache (BASH) Headache Management Guidelines.

== Research and publications ==
MacGregor has published over 200 research papers and book chapters, five single author books, five co-authored books, and has co-edited four books. She has experience of trials in drug treatments for migraine and cluster headache as well as her specified interest in menstrual migraine. The results of her research led to the development of research criteria for menstrual migraine, adopted by the International Headache Society in 2004.

== Awards and honours ==
- In 2002, MacGregor received the Elizabeth Garrett Anderson Award, awarded to women whose work over time has made an extraordinary contribution to relieving those affected by headaches.
- In 2011, she received the Special Recognition Award and Honorary Life Membership from the International Headache Society.
- In 2013, co-authored book with Professor John Guillebaud, "Contraception: Your Questions Answered," was Highly Commended in the British Medical Association Book Awards.

== Selected works ==
- MacGregor EA. Menstrual and perimenopausal migraine: a narrative review. Maturitas 2020 DOI: https://doi.org/10.1016/j.maturitas.2020.07.005
- Barra M, Dahl FA, Vetvik KG, MacGregor EA. A Markov chain method for counting and modelling migraine attacks.Scientific Reports 2020;10:3631 (Link)
- Ornello R, Canonico M, Merki-Feld GS, Kurth T, Lidegaard O, MacGregor EA et al. Migraine, low-dose combined hormonal contraceptives, and ischemic stroke in young women: a systematic review and suggestions for future research. Expert Review of Neurotherapeutics 2020;20(4):313-7 (Link)
- Barra M, Dahl FA, MacGregor EA, Vetvik KG. Identifying menstrual migraine– improving the diagnostic criteria using a statistical method. J Headache Pain 2019;29:95 (Link)
- Steiner TJ, Jensen R, Katsarava Z, et al. Aids to management of headache disorders in primary care (2nd edition) : on behalf of the European Headache Federation and Lifting The Burden: the Global Campaign against Headache. J Headache Pain 2019;20(1):57. (Link)
- MacGregor EA, Guillebaud J. Time to consign the contraceptive hormone free interval to history. BMJ Sexual and Reproductive Healthcare 2018 doi:10.1136/bmjsrh-2017-200036 (Link)
- Sacco S, Merki-Feld GS, Aegidius KL, et al. Effect of exogenous estrogens and progestogens on the course of migraine during reproductive age: a consensus statement by the European Headache Federation (EHF) and the European Society of Contraception and Reproductive Health (ESCRH). J Headache Pain 2018;19(1):76. doi: 10.1186/s10194-018-0896-5 (Link)
- Guillebaud J, MacGregor A. Contraception: Your Questions Answered (7th Edition). Churchill Livingstone 2017 ISBN 978-0-7020-7000-6
- MacGregor EA. In the Clinic: Migraine. Ann Intern Med. 2017;166(7): ITC49-ITC64. doi: 10.7326/AITC201704040
- Vetvik K, MacGregor EA. Sex differences in the epidemiology, clinical features, and pathophysiology of migraine. Lancet Neurol. 2017; 16:76-87 (Link)
- MacGregor EA. Diagnosing Migraine. J Fam Plann Reprod Health Care. 2016;42:280–286. (Link)
- MacGregor EA. Migraine management during menstruation and menopause. Continuum. 2015;21:990-1003.
- Vetvik KG, Benth JS, MacGregor EA, Lundqvist C, Russell MB. Menstrual versus non-menstrual attacks of migraine without aura in women with and without menstrual migraine. Cephalalgia. 2015;35:1261-1268.
- Vetvik KG, MacGregor EA, Lundqvist C, Russell MB. A clinical interview versus prospective headache diaries in the diagnosis of menstrual migraine without aura. Cephalalgia. 2015;35:410-416.
- Vetvik KG, MacGregor EA, Lundqvist C, Russell MB. Contraceptive-induced amenorrhoea leads to reduced migraine frequency in women with menstrual migraine without aura. J Headache Pain 2014;15 (Link)
- Vetvik KG, MacGregor EA, Lundqvist C, Russell MB. Prevalence of menstrual migraine: A population-based study. Cephalalgia 2014;34:280-288
- MacGregor EA. Headache in pregnancy. Continuum. 2014;20:128-147
- Shephard MK, MacGregor EA, Zakrzewska JM. Orofacial Pain: A Guide for the Headache Physician. Headache 2014;54:22-39
- MacGregor EA. Contraception and Headache. Headache 2013;53:247-76
- Westergaard ML, Steiner TJ, MacGregor EA, Antonaci F, Tassorelli C, Buse DC, Lipton RB, Jensen RH. The Headache Under-Response to Treatment (HURT) Questionnaire: Assessment of utility in headache specialist care. Cephalalgia 2013;33:245–55
- Guillebaud J, MacGregor A. Contraception: your questions answered (6th Edition) Elsevier 2013 ISBN 978-0-7020-4619-3
- MacGregor EA. Headache in Pregnancy. Neurol Clin 2012;30:835-66
- MacGregor EA. Classification of Perimenstrual Headache: Clinical Relevance. Curr Pain Headache Reports 2012;16:452-60
- MacGregor EA. Minireview: Perimenopausal migraine in women with vasomotor symptoms. Maturitas 2012;71:79-82
- MacGregor EA. Progress in the pharmacotherapy of menstrual migraine. Clinical Medicine Insights: Therapeutics 2011:3 245–273
- MacGregor EA, Rosenberg JD, Kurth T. Sex-related differences in epidemiological and clinic-based headache studies. Headache 2011;51:843-59
- Guillebaud J, MacGregor A. The Pill and other forms of hormonal contraception (7th Edition) OUP 2009 ISBN 978-0-19-956576-4
- MacGregor EA, Frith A (Eds). ABC of Headache. Wiley Blackwell 2008 ISBN 978-1-4051-7066-6
- MacGregor Dr Anne. Understanding Migraine and Other Headaches. Family Doctor Publications (BMA) 2006 ISBN 1-903474-49-3
- MacGregor Dr. Anne. Understanding the menopause and HRT. Family Doctor Publications (BMA). 2006 ISBN 1-903474-24-8
- MacGregor EA, Frith A, Ellis J, Aspinall L, Hackshaw A. Prevention of menstrual attacks of migraine: a double-blind placebo-controlled crossover study. Neurology 2006;67(12):2159-63.
- MacGregor EA, Frith A, Ellis J, Aspinall L, Hackshaw A. Incidence of migraine relative to menstrual cycle phases of rising and falling estrogen. Neurology 2006;67(12):2154-8.
- MacGregor EA, Frith A, Ellis J, Apsinall L. Predicting menstrual migraine with a home-use fertility monitor. Neurology 2005;64:561-3.
- MacGregor EA. Oestrogen and attacks of migraine with and without aura. Lancet Neurol 2004;3:354-61.
- MacGregor EA, Hackshaw A. Prevalence of migraine on each day of the natural menstrual cycle. Neurology 2004;63:351-3.
- MacGregor EA, Hackshaw A. Prevention of migraine in the pill-free week of combined oral contraceptives using natural oestrogen supplements. J Fam Plann Reprod Healthcare 2002;28:27-31
- MacGregor EA. Menstrual migraine: towards a definition. Cephalalgia 1996;16:11-21.
- MacGregor EA, Chia HMY, Vohrah C, Wilkinson M. Migraine and menstruation: a pilot study. Cephalalgia 1990;10:305-10.
