= Eliza Walker Dunbar =

Scottish physician (1845–1925)

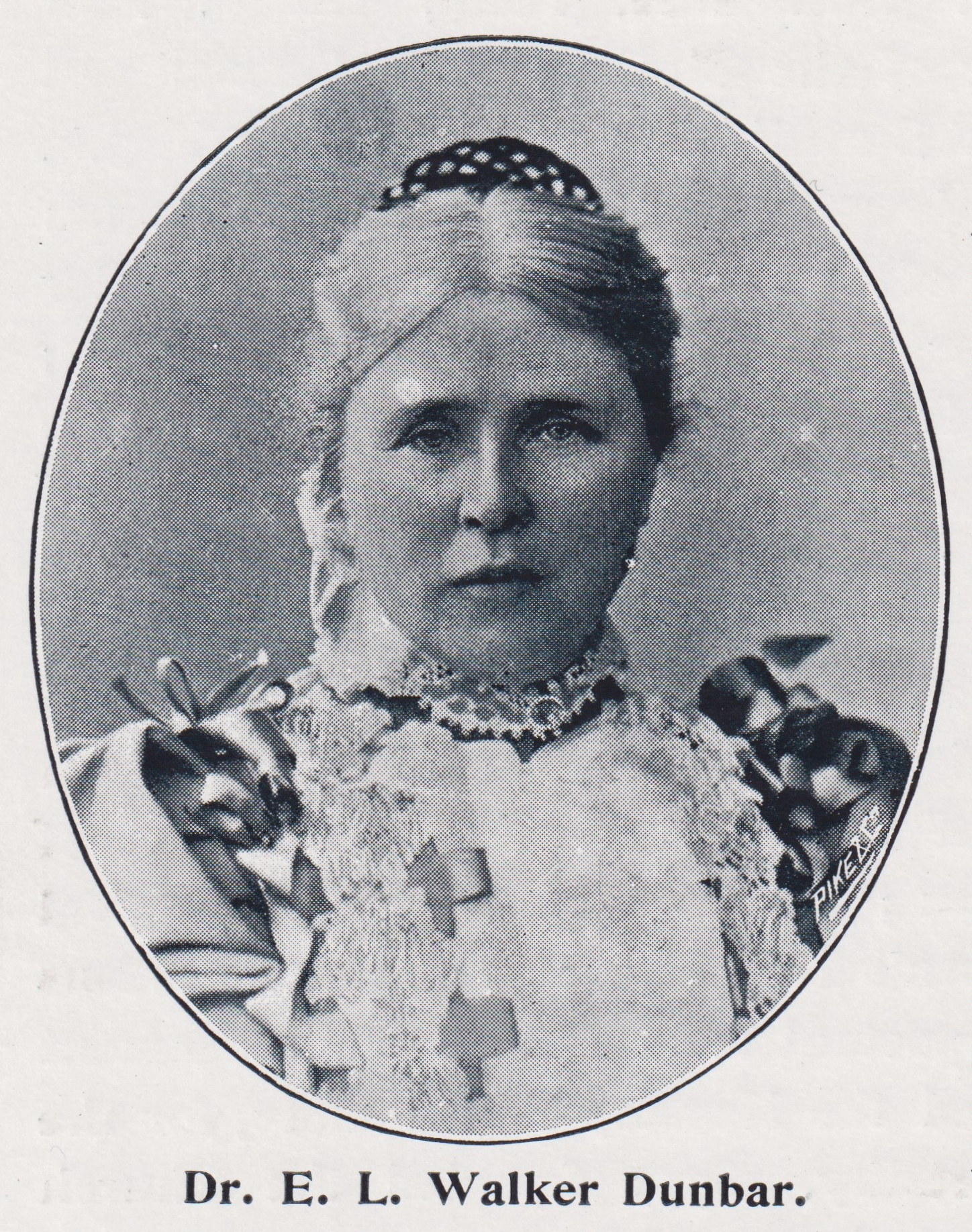
- Photograph of Dr Eliza Walker Dunbar (1898)
- Born: Eliza Louisa Walker; 1845; Bombay, India
- Died: 25 August 1925 (aged 79–80); Clifton, Bristol, England
- Education: Cheltenham Ladies' College; St. Mary's Dispensary for Women; Frankfurt; University of Zurich; Vienna
- Occupation: physician
- Known for: one of the first female medical doctors in the UK
- Medical career
- Profession: Surgeon
- Field: women and children's healthcare

Eliza Walker Dunbar (4 November 1845 – 25 August 1925) was a Scottish physician, one of the first women in the UK to be employed as a hospital doctor and the first to receive a UK medical licence by examination.

== Early life and education ==
Eliza Louisa Walker was born in Balaram Street, Bombay, India in 1845. Her father, Alexander Walker, was a doctor from Edinburgh who worked for the Bombay Military Department. Her younger brother, Archibald Dunbar Walker, also trained in the medical profession.

Walker attended Cheltenham Ladies' College (1856–61), during the early headship of Dorothea Beale. The daughter of a surgeon, Beale was a prominent suffragist, who promoted the teaching of science and German to girls, over the humanities and Latin. Walker continued to engage with Dorothea Beale and the college after she left, serving as one of the founding committee members of the Guild of Cheltenham Ladies' College when it was established in 1884.

After leaving Cheltenham, Eliza Walker studied at a private school in Frankfurt. By 1867 she was studying medicine and receiving medical training in London at St Mary's Dispensary in Marylebone, run by Elizabeth Garrett. Walker's hope was that, like Garrett, she would be able to take the licentiate examination of the Society of Apothecaries and be accepted on to the medical register this way. However, the Society of Apothecaries then changed its rules in 1867 to exclude those who had not attended regular medical schools. Since no English medical school accepted women, this effectively excluded all female applicants.

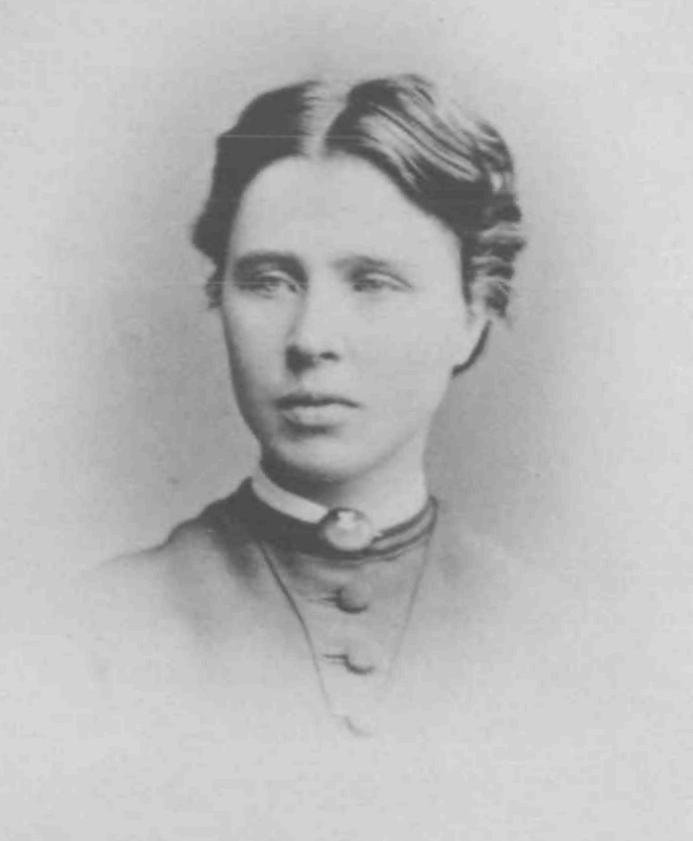
Photograph of Eliza Walker while studying in Zurich, c.1870

Realising that she could not progress in the UK, Eliza Walker applied to study medicine at the University of Zurich. In 1867 the university had decided to allow women to take their degree there. In the summer of 1867 the Russian, Nadezhda Suslova, who had been attending lectures and studying medicine in Russia and Switzerland for several years, passed her qualifying examinations for the M.D. She defended her thesis and was awarded her doctorate in December 1867.

Eliza Walker studied at Zurich 1868–72, along with two other British women, Frances Elizabeth Morgan and Louisa Atkins. Eliza was the youngest of the group known as the 'Zurich Seven', who were the first women to gain a medical degree from the university. She appears to have been well liked, being described as 'la très jolie Ecossaise' (the very pretty Scottish woman) by Auguste Forel. After studying at Zurich for four years, she submitted her thesis on blockages of the arteries of the brain (Ueber Verstopfung der Hirnarterien), receiving an MD with distinction in 1872. While at the university, she became the first woman assistant in the Zurich canton hospital's women's ward. She carried on to do a year's postgraduate study in Vienna, before returning to England in 1873.

== Career ==
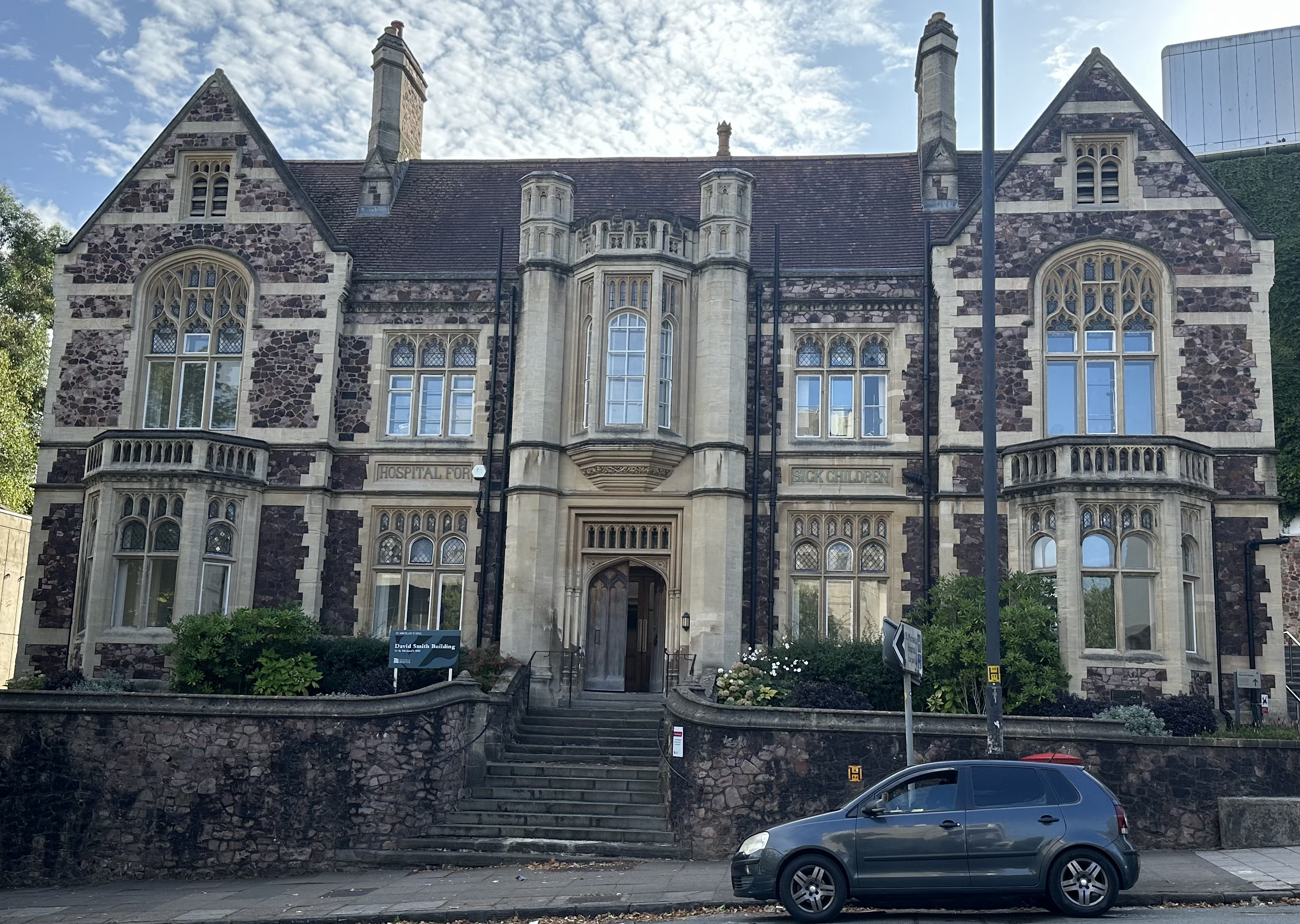
The surviving part of Bristol's Hospital for Sick Children (est. 1866) where Eliza Walker was appointed as House Surgeon in 1873. This part dates to 1885.

On her return to England in 1873, Dr Walker applied for and was appointed to the position of House Surgeon at Bristol Hospital for Sick Children (est. 1866). This was located at that time in a converted dwelling house in Royal Fort, St Michael's Hill, on the south side of the Royal Fort Gatehouse. She was the only woman among thirteen candidates. The incumbent medical staff informed the hospital's board of governors that they would resign if she were appointed. When she did get the job, two staff immediately left. The governors, who were all wealthy Bristol men, continued to back her, while press coverage suggests there was also much public support her appointment, both in Bristol and nationally. However, five weeks later, an argument between Walker and another staff member over the treatment of a patient led to the remainder of the doctors, all male, walking out. Part of the problem was that Walker was the only salaried doctor at the hospital, with overall charge for supervising care there. The male doctors, who were all honorary staff volunteering their services, resented having their judgments questioned by a woman. After the walk-out, Walker remained in post for five more days, the only medical practitioner on site, before tendering her resignation on 25 July to save the hospital further embarrassment.

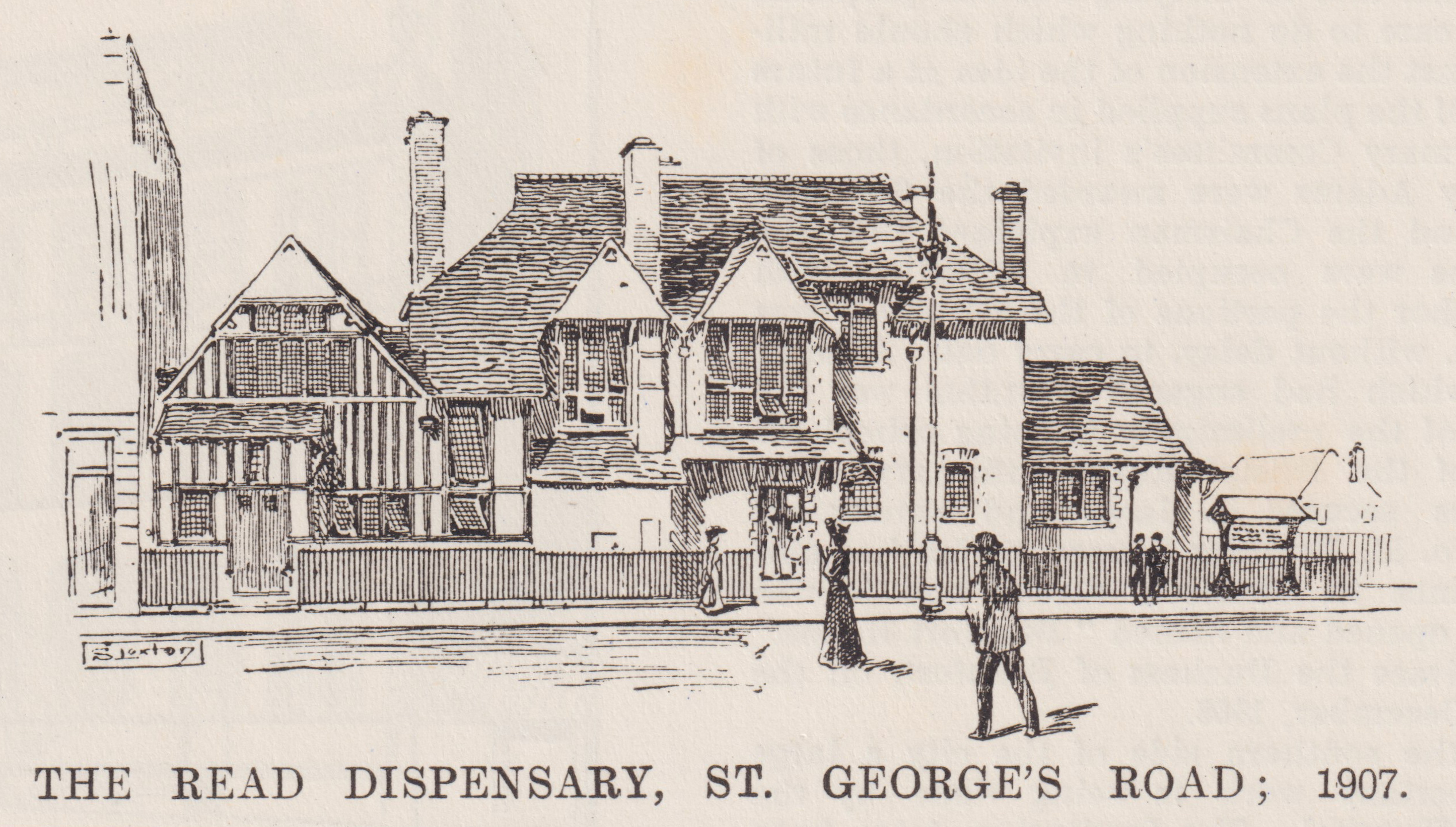
The Read Dispensary, Bristol, 1907

Following her resignation, Dr Walker set up a private practice in Clifton, Bristol. In December 1874 she added the family name Dunbar to that of Walker to become 'Walker Dunbar'. This was her maternal grandmother's maiden name. She was, however, most commonly known as just 'Dr Dunbar' in later life.

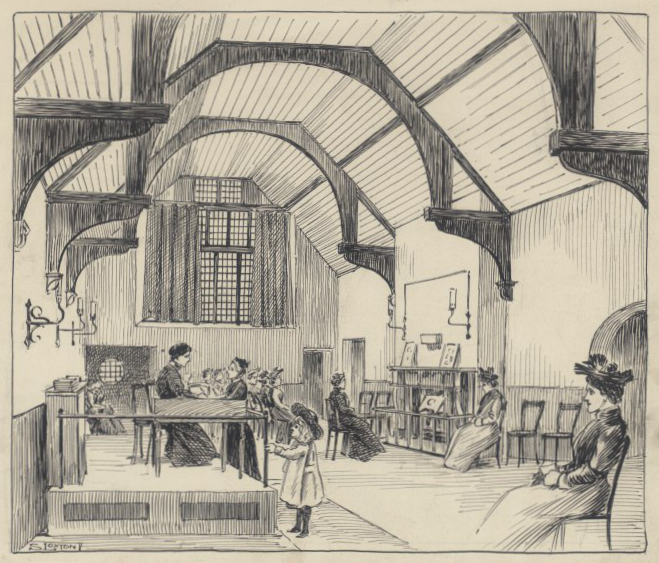
The waiting hall of The Read Dispensary, 1907

In 1876 Dr Dunbar established the Read Dispensary for Women and Children in Hotwells, Bristol, with the help and support of Miss Lucy Read, a supporter of the women's movement in Bristol. This was on St. George's Road, initially open two days a week. Within a few years it had expanded significantly, attracting women from all over Bristol and beyond. By 1885 it was seeing c.1,800 patients per year. In October 1906 the dispensary moved to a larger, purpose built site, on St George's Road.

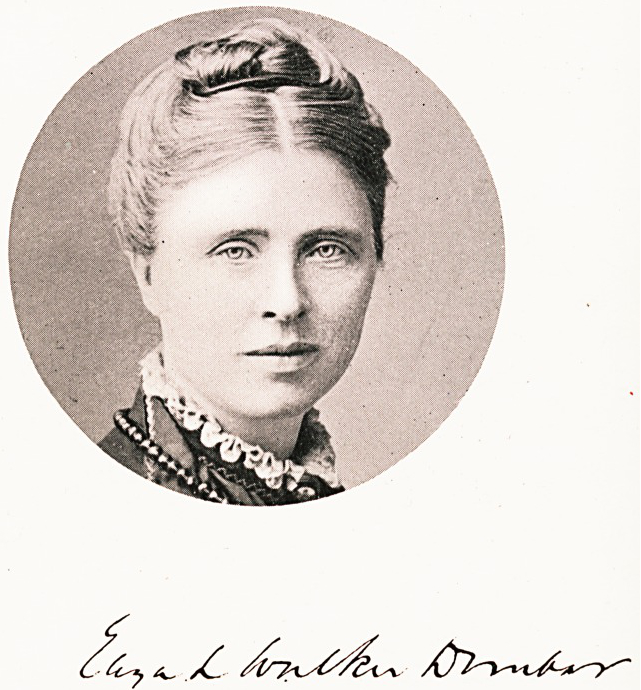
Dr Eliza L Walker Dunbar, c.1880

On 11 August 1876, Parliament passed the Medical Act 1876 (also known as the 1876 Enabling Act) allowing UK medical authorities to license qualified applicants regardless of gender. The King and Queen's College of Physicians in Ireland were the first UK authority to allow women who already had foreign degrees to take their licence examinations there from 1877. Dr Dunbar took the exam in Dublin on 10 January 1877, to become the first woman to qualify for a medical licence by examination from a UK medical institution. That a woman had been awarded a 'degree in medicine' was widely reported in the UK Press, this being the first time a woman had been awarded such a qualification by a UK institution. Dr Walker Dunbar's name was added to the UK medical register on 12 September 1877, along with Louisa Atkins, Frances Hogan and Sophia Jex-Blake, who also took their exams in Dublin that year. These were not the first women to be registered: Elizabeth Blackwell had been on the UK medical register since 1 January 1859. However, Blackwell had been registered under a clause of the Medical Act 1858 which permitted doctors with foreign degrees to register if they had practiced medicine in the UK prior to 1858. So no examination had been required.

Dr Dunbar held a number of roles in subsequent years, including medical officer for educational facilities in Bristol such as the Red Lodge Reformatory for Girls, the Bristol Training College of Elementary Teachers and the Department of Education (women) of University College Bristol from its foundation in 1892. She also acted in some teaching roles, lecturing at the London School of Medicine for Women in 1888 and delivering a course of lectures on Physiology at University College Bristol in 1890, funded by the Bristol and Clifton Branch of the Teachers' Guild of Great Britain and Ireland. In addition, Dunbar ran courses at the newly established Redland High School for Girls on 'Hygiene' (1888) and 'Physical Training for Girls' (1891). Even for a school run on liberal lines, the latter course was considered 'a rather advanced subject to lecture on in those days'.

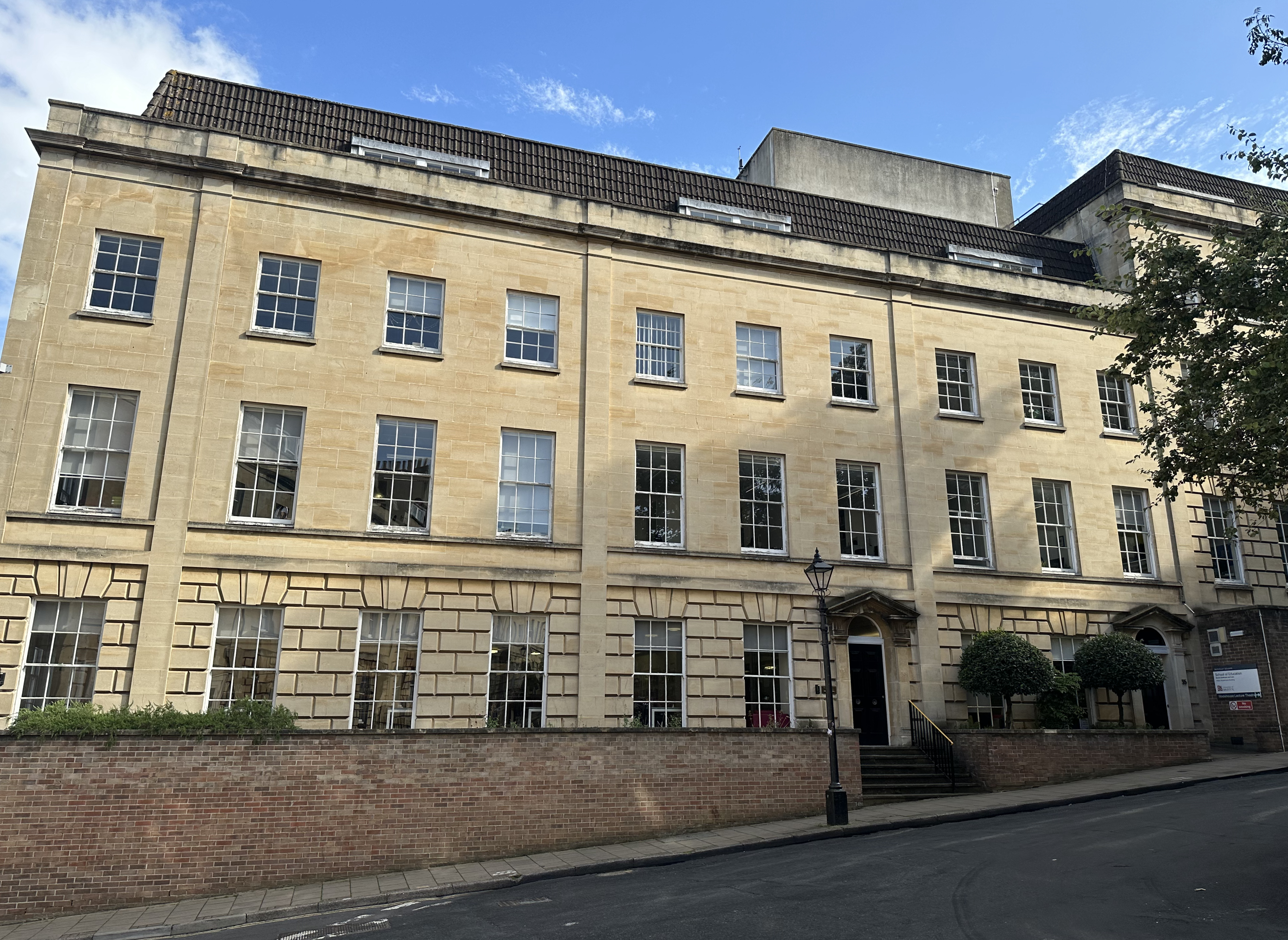
School of Education, University of Bristol. Site of Dr Dunbar's hospital (est. 1895) at 34 Berkeley Square

In August 1878, the Irish Graduates Association for medical practitioners, convening at the British Medical Association annual meeting in Bath, agreed to accept Eliza Walker Dunbar into their association. However, at the same meeting the BMA decided to expel women who had been recently been accepted as members, such as Frances Hogan, on the grounds that they had been 'illegally elected' and 'inadvertently admitted to the Association'. This decision was only reversed in 1892. That year, Dr Walker Dunbar, along with Elizabeth Garrett Anderson and Dr Sarah Gray, attended the annual meeting of the British Medical Association, held in Nottingham. There they lobbied successfully for the BMA to remove its bar on the admission of women. In 1894 Dunbar, along with 40 other female doctors, were admitted into the BMA. She was one of two women to give papers at the BMA annual meeting held at Bristol that August, both in the 'Obstetrics and Gynaecology' section.

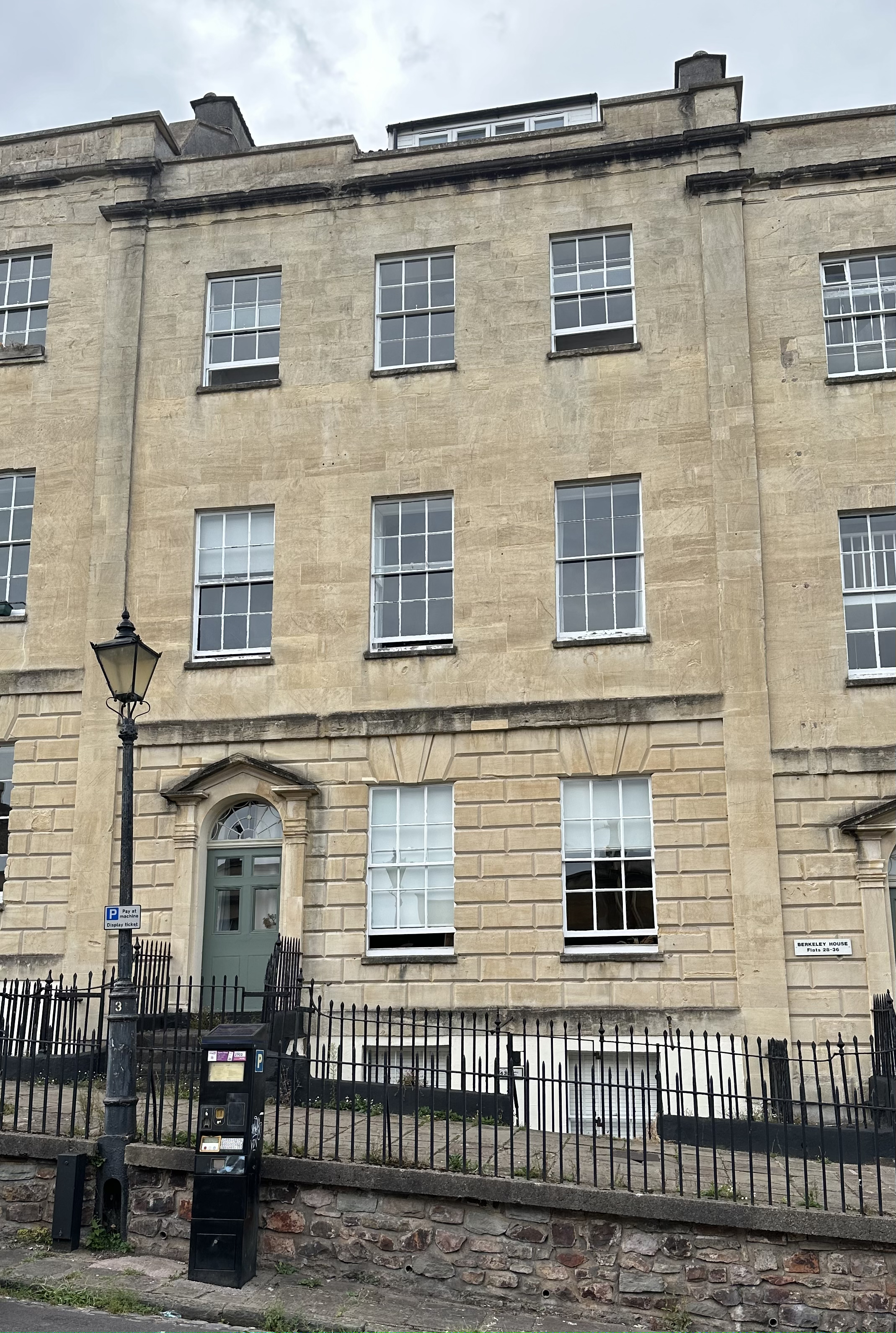
7 Charlotte Street, Bristol. The second site of Dr Dunbar's Private Hospital for Women and Children, est. 1895

In December 1895, Dr Dunbar opened the Bristol Private Hospital for Women and Children at 34 Berkeley Square, Clifton, realising 'the grand idea of her life'. She held the post of Senior Surgeon there until her death. The site is now part of the School of Education at the University of Bristol. Originally the private hospital had space for 12 patients, and focused on the treatment of women by women. By 1914 the hospital had expanded to a second site, about 50 metres away, on 7 Charlotte Street. The hospital was staffed by three female doctors, Walker-Dunbar, Marion S. Linton and Lilly A. Baker, all three of whom were also the chief medical attendants at the Read Dispensary. Both the hospital and the dispensary were supported by a combination of 'voluntary contributions and payment.'

In 1898 Eliza Dunbar was the only woman to get an entry in her own right in the 'Contemporary Biographies' section of a biographic encyclopaedia of Bristol, out of a total of 464. In 1906 she published an article in the Bristol Medico-Chirurgical Journal on "The new theory and prophylactic treatment of puerperal eclampsia."

Dunbar continued her work until her death following a fall at her home, 9 Oakfield Rd in Bristol on 25 August 1925. In accordance with her written instructions, her remains were cremated at Golders Green Crematorium in London on 30 August, her ashes afterwards being scattered in the Garden of Rest.

On her death a colleague commented:

Dr Dunbar was essentially a pioneer, and to the end of her career she showed as outstanding qualities courage, perseverance and pluck. She gathered round her, and retained throughout her life, a devoted band of friends and supporters.

== Political activism ==
Eliza Walker Dunbar became involved in Bristol's female suffrage movement soon after her arrival in 1873, serving on the committee of the Bristol & West of England Society for Women's Suffrage from 1875. Chairing a suffrage meeting in October 1877, she linked the movement to the campaign to extend the franchise to male agricultural labourers, arguing that 'It was just that women be considered as a class, as long as men and women differ as to what were the true interests of women.'

She was a leading member of the Bristol Working Women's Union and one of the founders of the National Union of Working Women (NUWW), established in Bristol on the suggestion of the London trade unionist, Emma Paterson. Dunbar addressed the NUWW's first meeting on 3 August 1875. In 1878 she was one of the NUWW's three delegates to the Annual meeting of the Trades Union Congress, held that year in Bristol. There she argued that working women needed to proceed by:

seeking by combination with other women to obtain those ends which we believe to lie near our best interests. The weakest point of the Trades' Unions seems to me at present that there are comparatively few women who belong to them.

Dunbar organised a number of conferences in Bristol in the late nineteenth century on 'Women workers', where she advocated positions that were more left-wing and more critical of social darwinist positions than most of the Bristol's elite female reformers. She was one of the few women in these groups who believed that socialism might bring about a better society, voting against a 1910 motion attacking the ideology. One of the purposes of the hospital Dr Dunbar founded in 1895 was to provide training opportunities for women doctors. As reported in The Englishwoman's Review, which was one of the first feminist journals:

It is not only a hospital for women patients, it is a hospital for the women doctors of Bristol...for this was the only hospital in England, outside London, for women, attended by a medical staff of women, and its value, therefore, was great, not only for the patients, but for the women doctors of Bristol.

Dunbar's hospital was managed by her colleague, Dr Emily Eberle. Although Dunbar was a Temperance supporter, she was critical of both teetotalism and the common tendency to blame the poor for their drinking habits, which was often cast as an inherited deficiency. She argued at a 1892 conference on 'The Temperance Question' that:

The dulness of the poor drives them to drink. How dull is the poor woman whose work for her family has no end and no relief of friendly aid! It is not so much drink she longs for as the contentment and cheerfulness which alcohol induces.

On evangelical teetotalism, she argued:

If you think that by drinking a little wine you will ruin the whole world, then, for God’s sake, don’t do it! But be tolerant to those who see no harm in moderation, and cannot agree that the abstinence of the few will cure the inebriety of the world.

== Legacy ==
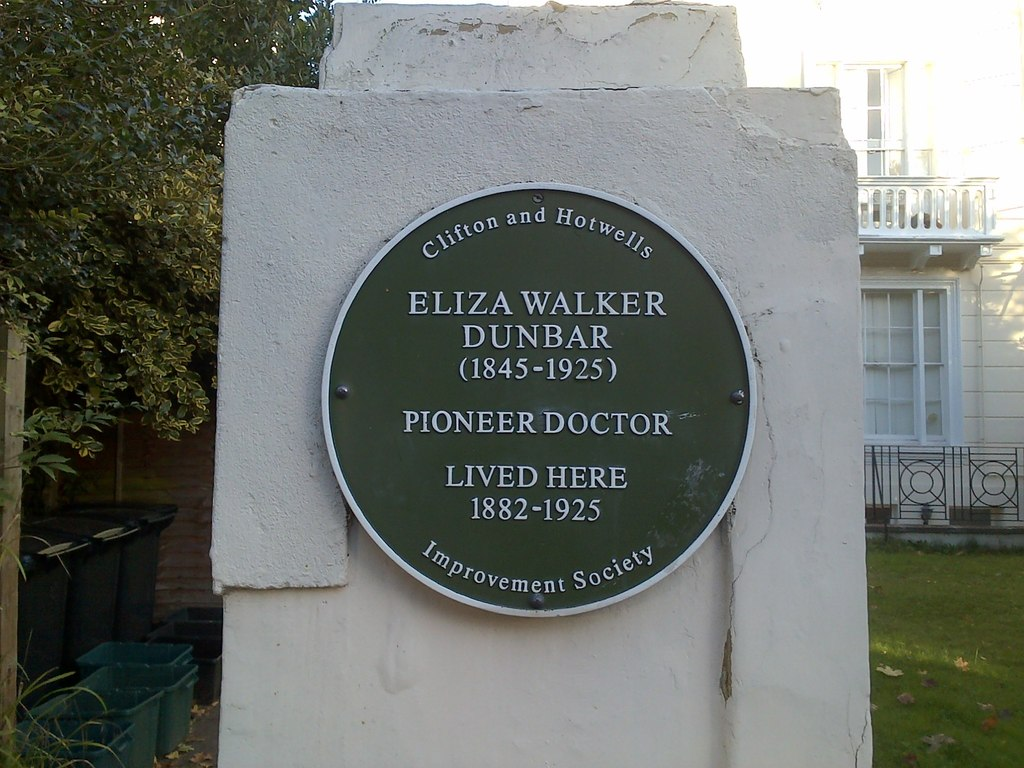
Green Plaque at 9 Oakfield Road, Clifton, to honour the house of Eliza Walker Dunbar

Eliza Dunbar's death was recorded in a number of medical obituaries, including the British Medical Journal. The obituary for The Medical Women's Federation Newsletter said of her:

Dr. Dunbar was essentially a pioneer and a born fighter. Intrepid in thought and action she possessed, and retained to the end, high qualities of courage and enterprise. She was remarkably loyal and devoted to her old friends and patients, by whom also she was greatly beloved, and her sympathy and support were always forthcoming for the women's cause, to the advancement of which she herself so ably and fearlessly contributed.

A local medical journal added:

It is well to recall that the present advantage of freedom to work enjoyed by women are the direct fruit of the heroic struggles of those earlier determined spirits who, like Dr. Walker Dunbar, fought their way onward through obloquy and opposition. For many years Dr. Dunbar used to remove her brass plate at night lest morning should find it stolen or defaced!

After her death, Dr Dunbar's foundation was renamed the Walker Dunbar Hospital, retaining that name until the 1960s as a part of the Southmead General Hospital Group. By this time the main site of the much expanded hospital was on Clifton Down Road.

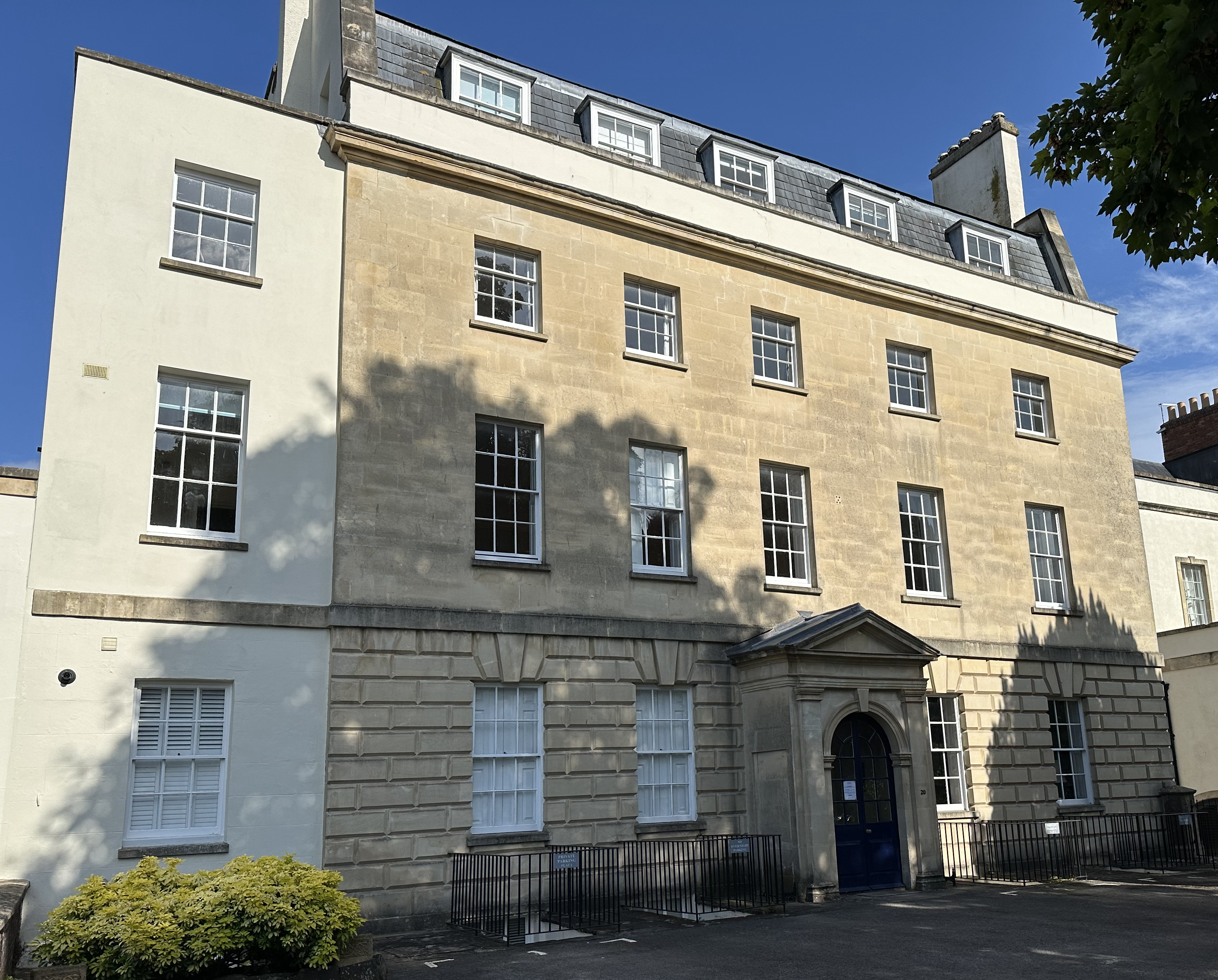
Duncan House, Clifton: former Walker Dunbar Hospital

Despite being recognised as a pioneer in her lifetime, little was written about Dr Dunbar during the twentieth century. Even in 2000, her entry in the Biographical Dictionary of Women in Science, noted merely that 'Biographical information is very sketchy on Eliza Walker.' The only known biographical source at that time was the 1925 obituary in The Medical Women's Federation Newsletter. This had been identified by the historian Thomas Bonner following his brief discussion of Walker in his 1989 article on the 'Zurich Seven' More became known with the publication of Mary Ann Elston's short article on Dr Dunbar in the Oxford Dictionary of National Biography, which drew on a wider range of printed sources. A growth in interest in women's history / gender history also resulted in Dunbar being discussed by historians in relation to her political and social activism.

Blue Plaque installed by University of Bristol

Doctor's plate installed by University of Bristol, 34 Berkeley Square

In 2003 a plaque was added to Dunbar's house in Clifton in her honour by the Clifton and Hotwells Improvement Society. In 2023 the Bristol Post published two page article about Dunbar to commemorate the 150th anniversary of her appointment to the Bristol Children's Hospital. In November 2026 the University of Bristol installed a Blue Plaque on 34 Berkeley Square, which is the site of the hospital she opened in 1895 and is now part of its School of Education. The plaque recognises Dr Dunbar's wider contribution to the Women's Movement in Bristol. It is accompanied by a replica of the brass doctor's plate she used to remove each night to protect it from vandals.
