= Louisa Atkins =

British physician (1842–1924)

- Born: Louisa Catherine Fanny Bell; 1842
- Died: 1924 (aged 81–82)
- Occupations: Physician, medical lecturer
- Employer(s): Birmingham and Midlands Hospital for Women; New Hospital for Women
- Known for: Being one of the first British women to qualify in medicine

Louisa Atkins (1842–1924) was a British physician, and one of the first British women to qualify in medicine. She was also England's first female House Surgeon, at the Birmingham and Midlands Hospital for Women. The BMJ described her as "a pioneer in the cause of medicine as a profession for women".

== Early life ==
Louisa Catherine Fanny Bell was born in 1842, the daughter of Robert and Henrietta Bell of Hull. Atkins had a "continental upbringing", and had been educated in France. When still young, she went to India, where in 1860 she married Frederick William Maclean Atkins - an army officer many years her senior. He died a few years after their marriage, when Louisa was still considered a minor.

== Medical career ==
The London School of Medicine for Women not yet being open, Atkins attended medical school in Zurich, matriculating in 1867 and gaining her degree in 1872. She was one of the "Zurich 7": the first group of women to be admitted to, and awarded degrees from, Zurich's medical school. Her thesis was titled Ueber Gangraena Pulmonum bei Kindern (pulmonary gangrene in children).

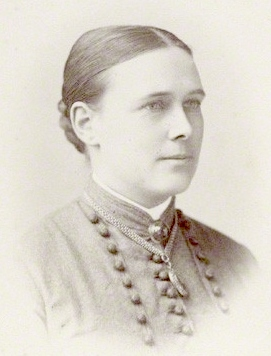
Edith Pechey, who succeeded Atkins as House Surgeon at the Birmingham Hospital for Women

In July 1872, Atkins was appointed house surgeon at the Birmingham and Midlands Hospital for Women, where she began a lifelong friendship with Arthur Chamberlain, brother of Neville Chamberlain. As women were not yet permitted to sit the examinations of any of the medical licensing bodies, Atkins was not fully registered, but the hospital's committee awarded her the position over two male candidates. This was a controversial decision, which led to accusations of a fixed appointment. A year later, though, it was acknowledged as a great success, and said that "A fair field and no favour should be given to a competent lady candidate". In 1877, Atkins took the Licence of the King and Queen's College of Physicians in Ireland when they began to admit women, qualifying alongside Sophia Jex-Blake and Edith Pechey.

Atkins was an early member of the Association of Registered Medical Women (ARMW), formed in 1879 in response to the British Medical Association's refusal to admit women doctors. At that time, 14 women were on the medical register in Britain, all of whom were invited to join the Association. Fellow members included Elizabeth Blackwell, Elizabeth Garrett Anderson, Sophia Jex-Blake, Annie Reay Barker, Annie Clark, Matilda Chaplin-Ayrton, Eliza Macdonogh Frikart, and Eliza Walker Dunbar.

Atkins began working at the New Hospital for Women (later the Elizabeth Garrett Anderson and Obstetric Hospital), where she remained for a number of years. Her colleagues there included Elizabeth Garrett Anderson and Annie de la Cherois. She also acted as lecturer on the Diseases of Women at the Women's School. Atkins resigned from the New Hospital for Women in 1888, due to her unheeded concerns about Garrett Anderson's surgical proficiency. Edith Pechey was appointed her successor.

Following her resignation, Atkins moved from Hanwell to Northwood, into a house built for her. There, and from consulting rooms in Upper Gloucester Place in London, she continued in private practice. This work, wrote The BMJ, "engaged her powers and absorbed her interest, to the great advantage of her patients' health (she was most successful in her practice) and to the acquisition of more than her share of devoted friends (she was much beloved)". Mary Scharlieb described Atkins as "an excellent physician and was able to bring to her patients' service those powers of vision and sympathy without which the greatest professional skill and knowledge are comparatively useless." The BMJ wrote that Atkins was "very human, very kind", adding that:

She possessed an open mind, nimble in its workings; and if she suffered at times from depression, at other times she could be very gay, delighting her company by her lively sallies. She was quite fearless in the expression of her mind and in the practice of her principles, wheresoever these might lead.

== Death ==
Atkins died at home in Northwood in 1924. The BMJ reported that it had been "her wish that her death should not appear in tho obituary columns of the papers, and so it came about that the event escaped the notice even of those among those circle of her intimate friends".

In an obituary for the Medical Women's Federation, Mary Scharlieb wrote of Atkins:

She was a woman who never courted publicity and was fully satisfied by her own consciousness that she had done her best and that her best was adequate. Apparently all her energies were given to the practice of Medicine, for none of her colleagues are aware of her having published books, pamphlets or papers. She did not speak in public but devoted all her surplus energies to the primitive and excellent occupation of gardening. I think amongst her claims for consideration among her colleagues and the students were her habitual graceful hospitality and her lovely roses.

In a 1995 paper for the History of Anaesthesia Society, E.T. Mathews wrote that Louisa Atkins "should be remembered as one who overcame exceptional difficulties to achieve her place in the profession."
