= Marcia Wilkinson =

English neurologist and researcher

Marcia Wilkinson FRCP
- Born: Marcia Isobel Pamela Harvey; 11 September 1919; Sheffield, England
- Died: 4 February 2013 (aged 93)
- Education: Somerville College, Oxford
- Occupation: neurologist
- Known for: contributions to the treatment of carpal tunnel syndrome rehabilitation of disabled young people migraine clinics and migraine research
- Medical career
- Field: neurology
- Institutions: City of London Migraine Clinic
- Sub-specialties: headache, migraine

Marcia Isobel Pamela Wilkinson FRCP (née Harvey; 11 September 1919 – 4 February 2013) was an English consultant neurologist, researcher and medical director of the City of London Migraine Clinic (now the National Migraine Centre).

Early in her career she made a significant contribution to the understanding and surgical treatment of carpal tunnel syndrome. In 1963 she established a rehabilitation unit for disabled young people which radically improved their chances of returning home rather than remaining in care as was norm at that time. She led research at the City of London Migraine Clinic, developing new methods for the treatment and management of migraine.

In 2000 she became the first recipient of the Elizabeth Garrett Anderson Award for her extraordinary contribution to relieving the burden of those affected by headache.

== Early life and education ==
Marcia Harvey was born on 11 September 1919 in Sheffield, England to Constance Armine (née Sandford) and Cosmo George St Clair Harvey, a colonel in the Royal Artillery. She attended Wycombe Abbey school, where she was head girl. She studied medicine at Somerville College, Oxford, where she was also a successful sports woman with blues in tennis and lacrosse, and a half blue in squash.

== Career ==
After graduating she worked at Radcliffe Infirmary, Oxford, and then at Maida Vale Hospital with eminent neurologist Russell Brain. Her first paper, published in The Lancet in 1947 and co-authored with Brain, is considered a landmark in the understanding and surgical treatment of carpal tunnel syndrome. Initially Brain hypothesized that flexion was responsible for median nerve compression however Wilkinson suggested that it was due to extension. To test Wilkinson's proposal, manometers were inserted into a wrist, and the measurements taken proved that Wilkinson was correct.

In 1949 she took up a position as a Nuffield Foundation research fellow at the Bernhard Baron Pathological Institute in the Royal London Hospital, where she studied the degeneration of the spine (spondylolysis). She used her research as the subject of her DM thesis.

In 1953 she took a consultant position at the Elizabeth Garrett Anderson Hospital, London remaining there until 1984. She also held posts at Hackney Hospital, South London Hospital and St Margaret's Hospital, Epping.

In 1963 she established a rehabilitation unit at Eastern Hospital, Hackney for young disabled people who had suffered head injuries. Her approach to rehabilitation differed radically from other units, with patients remaining at the unit on average for five months, undertaking physiotherapy and occupational therapy to maximising their recovery. With this approach 87% of patients returned home, where in other units many remained in care for the rest of their lives having had on average only four to six weeks of rehabilitation.

In October 1963, influenced by Elizabeth Garrett Anderson's thesis on migraine, which Wilkinson translated from French, and her own experiences as a migraine suffered, she established a migraine clinic at the Elizabeth Garrett Anderson Hospital. The clinic both treated patients and carried out research.

In 1970 she was appointed medical director of the City Migraine Clinic (later Princess Margaret Migraine Clinic). The clinic was the first of its kind in the world, seeing patients while they were suffering from migraine, and assessing and treating them. The work of clinic led to a change in the treatment of migraine through the use of metoclopramide to assist the gastric absorption of pain killer combined with rest in quiet, dark rooms. The clinic was successful; most patients recovered within two to three hours, and in the first four years more than 2,000 patients were directly treated with 6,000 more being referred to other physicians. When the clinic was threatened with closure in 1979, Wilkinson lobbied for it to remain open, securing the necessary funding 24 hours before it was due to close.

She retired in 1999.

== Awards and recognition ==
Wilkinson had an international reputation for her work on the treatment of migraine and was invited to give guest lectures around the world.

She received many awards in recognition of the importance of her work.

- Fellow of the Royal College of Physicians (1963)
- Distinguished Clinician Award, American Association for the Study of Headache (1982)
- Elizabeth Garrett Anderson Award (2000)
- Honorary Fellow, American Neurological Association
- Honorary member, Scandinavian Migraine Society
- Honorary member, British Association for the Study of Headache
- Honorary member, Anglo-Dutch Migraine Association
- Marcia Wilkinson Annual Lecture (1993-), Anglo-Dutch Migraine Association

== Personal life ==
In 1944 she married Anthony Wilkinson. He died in action a few weeks later. In 1952 she married fellow physician Louis Sefton, a dermatologist, and together they had two daughters, Ottilie and Armine. Sefton died in March 1956.

Wilkinson died in her sleep on 4 February 2013.
