= Cold-stimulus headache =

- Other names: Ice-cream headache, brain freeze
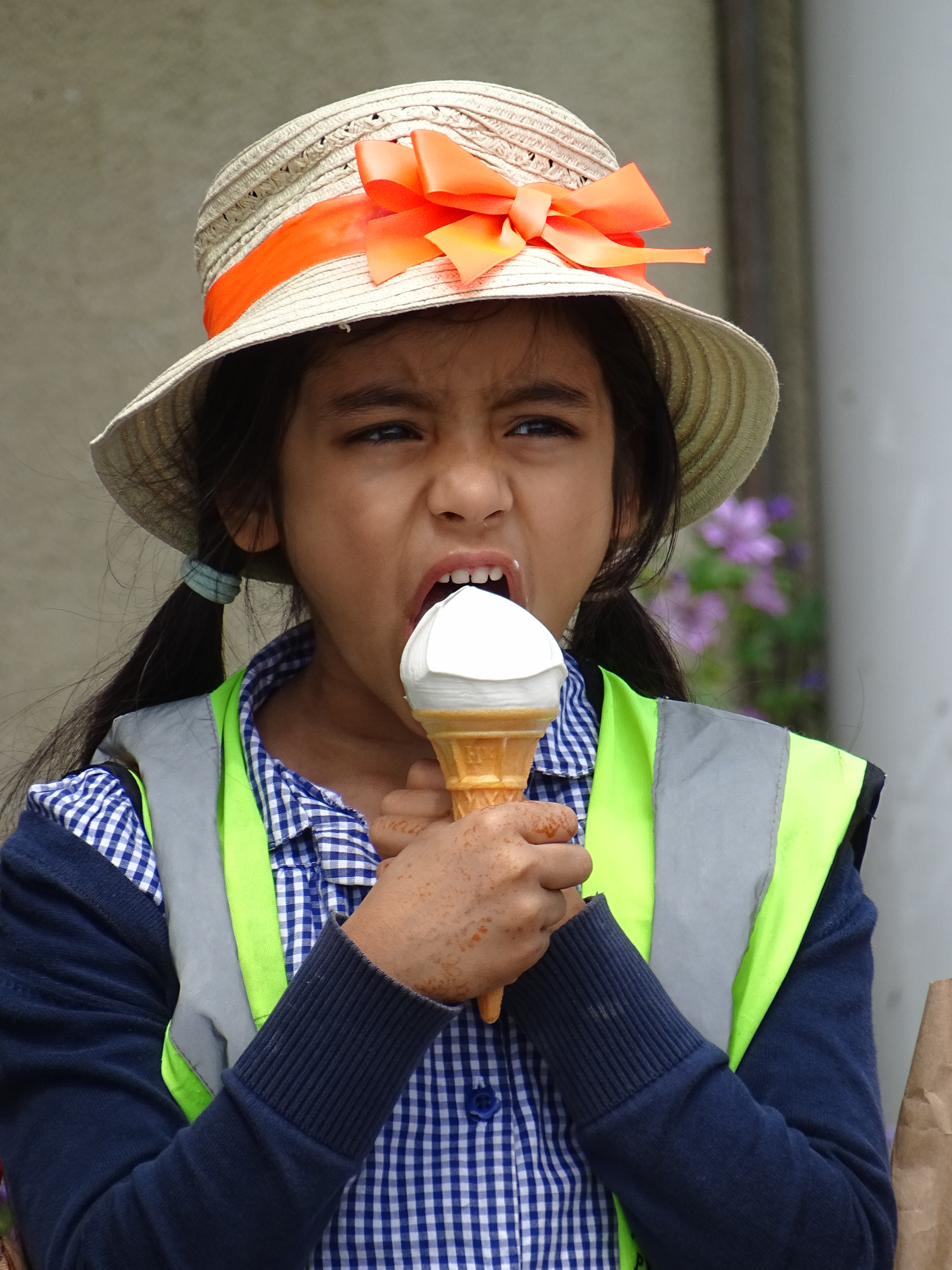
- A young girl hastily consuming ice cream, a common cause of cold-stimulus headaches, which are aptly called "brain freezes" or "ice-cream headaches"
- Specialty: Neurology
- Duration: 20 seconds to 2 minutes depending on severity
- Causes: Quick consumption of cold foods and beverages or prolonged oral exposure to cold stimuli
- Treatment: Removal of the cold stimulus from the oral cavity and thrusting the tongue towards the tip of the nose or roof of the mouth to relieve pain. Drinking warm water can also ease pain.

A cold-stimulus headache, colloquially known as brain freeze or an ice cream headache, is a form of brief pain or headache, commonly associated with consumption (particularly quick consumption) of cold beverages or foods such as ice cream, popsicles, slushies, and snow cones. It is caused by a cold substance touching the roof of the mouth, and is believed to result from a nerve response causing rapid constriction and swelling of blood vessels, "referring" pain from the roof of the mouth to the head. The rate of intake for cold foods has been studied as a contributing factor. It can also occur during a sudden exposure of the unprotected head to low temperatures, such as by diving into cold water. A cold-stimulus headache is distinct from dentin hypersensitivity, a type of dental pain that can occur under similar circumstances.

Cats and other animals have been observed exhibiting a similar reaction when presented with a similar stimulus.

== History ==
According to The New Yorker, the first written account of a cold-stimulus headache comes from Patrick Brydone in the 1770s. Brydone described a British naval officer in Sicily who consumed a large bite of ice cream and spat it out "with a horrid oath".

The term ice-cream headache has been in use since at least January 31, 1937, contained in a journal entry by Rebecca Timbres published in the 1939 book We Didn't Ask Utopia: A Quaker Family in Soviet Russia. The first published use of the term brain freeze, in the sense of a cold-stimulus headache, was in 1986. (Note: The earliest recorded use of the term "brain freeze" (with a different meaning) was in 1968 in a Canadian academic journal.) 7-‍Eleven has registered the term as a trademark.

== Cause and frequency ==
A cold-stimulus headache is thought to be the direct result of the rapid cooling and rewarming of the capillaries in the sinuses leading to periods of vasoconstriction and vasodilation. A similar, but painless, blood vessel response causes the face to appear "flushed" after being outside on a cold day. In both instances, the low temperature causes the capillaries in the sinuses to constrict and then experience extreme rebound dilation as they warm up again.

In the palate, this dilation is sensed by nearby pain receptors, which then send signals back to the brain via the trigeminal nerve, one of the major nerves of the facial area. This nerve also senses facial pain, so as the neural signals are conducted the brain interprets the pain as coming from the forehead—the same "referred pain" phenomenon seen in heart attacks. Brain-freeze pain may last from a few seconds to a few minutes. Research suggests that the same vascular mechanism and nerve implicated in "brain freeze" cause the aura (sensory disturbance) and pulsatile (throbbing pain) phases of migraines.

It is possible to have a cold-stimulus headache in both hot and cold weather, contrary to popular belief, because the effect relies upon the temperature of the food being consumed rather than that of the environment. Other causes that may mimic the sensation of cold-stimulus headache include that produced when high speed drilling is performed through the inner table of the skull in people undergoing such a procedure in an awake or sedated state.

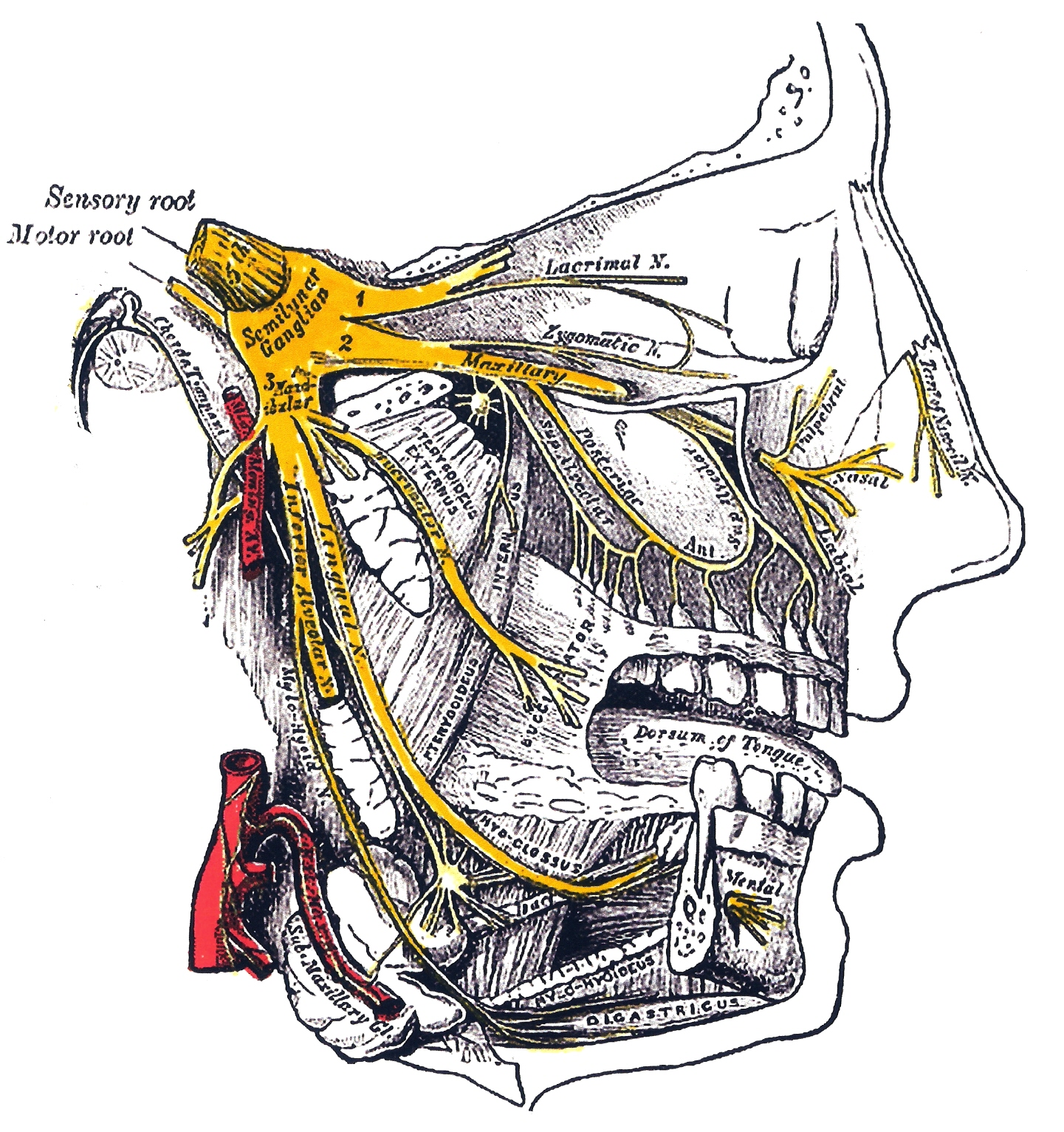
The trigeminal nerve, shown in yellow, conducts signals from dilating blood vessels in the palate to the brain, which interprets the pain as coming from the forehead.

=== Anterior cerebral artery theory ===
Another theory into the cause of cold-stimulus headaches is explained by increased blood flow to the brain through the anterior cerebral artery, which supplies oxygenated blood to most medial portions of the frontal lobes and superior medial parietal lobes. This increase in blood volume and resulting increase in size in this artery is thought to bring on the pain associated with a cold-stimulus headache.

When the anterior cerebral artery constricts, reining in the response to this increased blood volume, the pain disappears. The dilation, then quick constriction, of this blood vessel may be a type of self-defense for the brain.

This inflow of blood cannot be cleared as quickly as it is coming in during the cold-stimulus headache, so the blood flow could raise the pressure inside the skull and induce pain that way. As the intracranial pressure and temperature in the brain rise the blood vessel contracts, and the pressure in the brain is reduced before reaching dangerous levels.

== Research ==
Due to how shortlived the headache is, researchers like Amokrane Chebini and Esma Dilli have voiced how difficult it is to study the phenomenon. Thus, there is not much research that has been conducted on the topic.

The phenomenon is common enough to have been the subject of research published in the British Medical Journal and Scientific American. A study conducted by Maya Kaczorowski demonstrated a higher incidence of headache in subjects consuming an ice cream sample quickly, in less than five seconds, vs. those who consumed slowly, taking longer than thirty seconds (27% and 12%, respectively).

According to research conducted by Nigel Bird, Anne MacGregor, and Marcia I. Wilkinson published in the journal Headache, "17% of the migraine patients and 46% of the students developed headache following palatal application or a swallow of ice cream."

Research conducted by Ilaria Bonemazzi and several other colleagues found that the children participating in their study were more likely to develop cold-stimulus headaches compared to their adult counterparts. This may suggest that children are more sensitive to cold-stimulus headaches, and that children grow a resistance to these headaches as they grow into adults.

Cold-stimulus headaches are not always caused by consuming ice cream and other cold foods similar to it; it has been found that simply being in a colder environment may trigger the same symptoms associated with a cold-stimulus headache. In a letter written by SK Jankelowitz and AS Zagami, the authors describe a patient who experienced cold-stimulus headache symptoms while she was ice skating.
