= Fluorescent lamps and health =

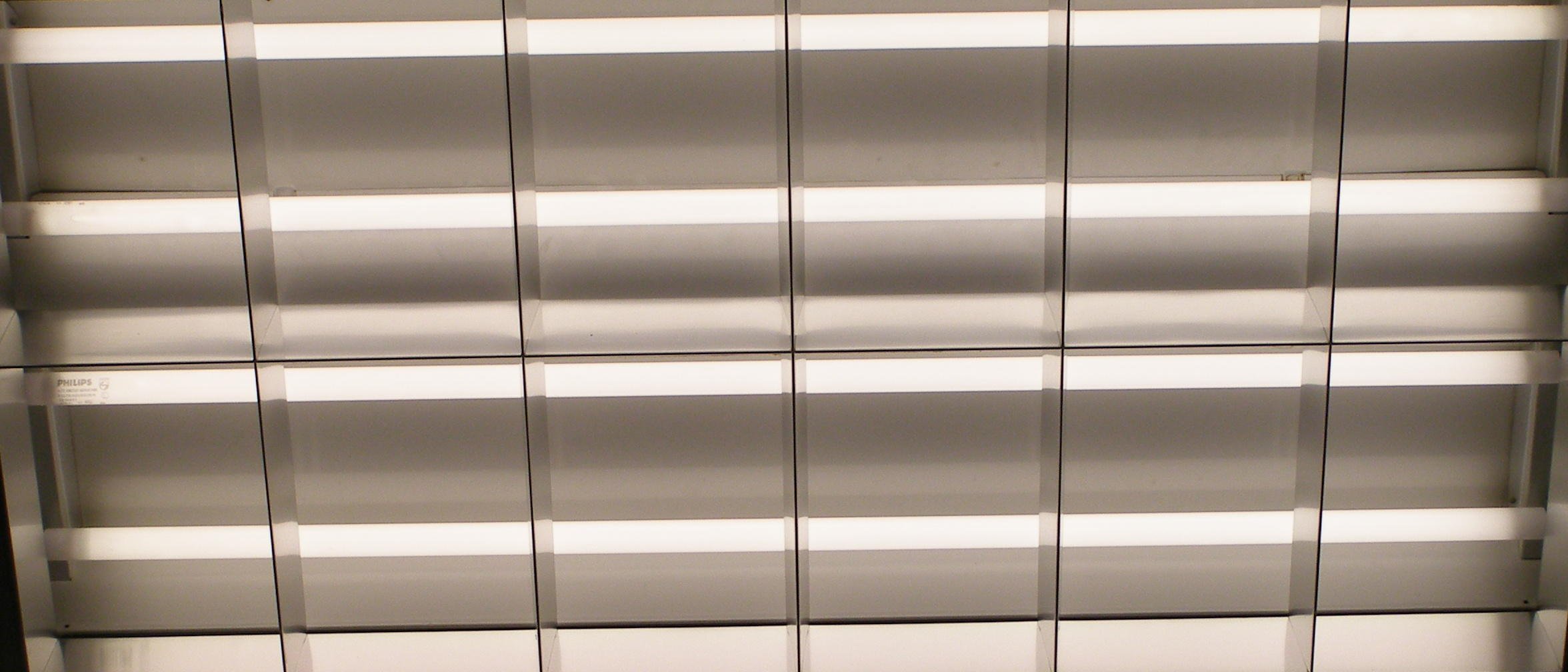
Common T8 fluorescent lighting fixture

Fluorescent lamps have been suggested to affect human health in various ways.

== Flicker effects ==
New lighting systems have not used magnetic ballasts since the turn of the century; however, some older installations still remain. Fluorescent lamps with magnetic ballasts flicker at a normally unnoticeable frequency of 100 or 120 Hz (twice the utility frequency – the lamp is lit on both the positive and negative half-wave of a cycle). This flickering can cause problems for some individuals with light sensitivity and are associated with headaches and eyestrain. Such lamps are listed as problematic for some individuals with autism, epilepsy, lupus, chronic fatigue syndrome, Lyme disease, and vertigo. Newer fluorescent lights without magnetic ballasts have essentially eliminated flicker.

Individuals with high flicker fusion threshold are particularly affected by these obsolete, electromagnetic ballasts: their EEG alpha waves are markedly attenuated and they perform office tasks with greater speed and decreased accuracy. Ordinary people have better reading performance using frequency (50–60 Hz) electromagnetic ballasts than electronic ballasts, although the effect was large only for the case of luminance contrast.

Early studies suspected a relationship between the flickering of fluorescent lamps with electromagnetic ballasts and repetitive movement in autistic children. However, these studies had interpretive problems and have not been replicated.

== Ultraviolet radiation risk ==
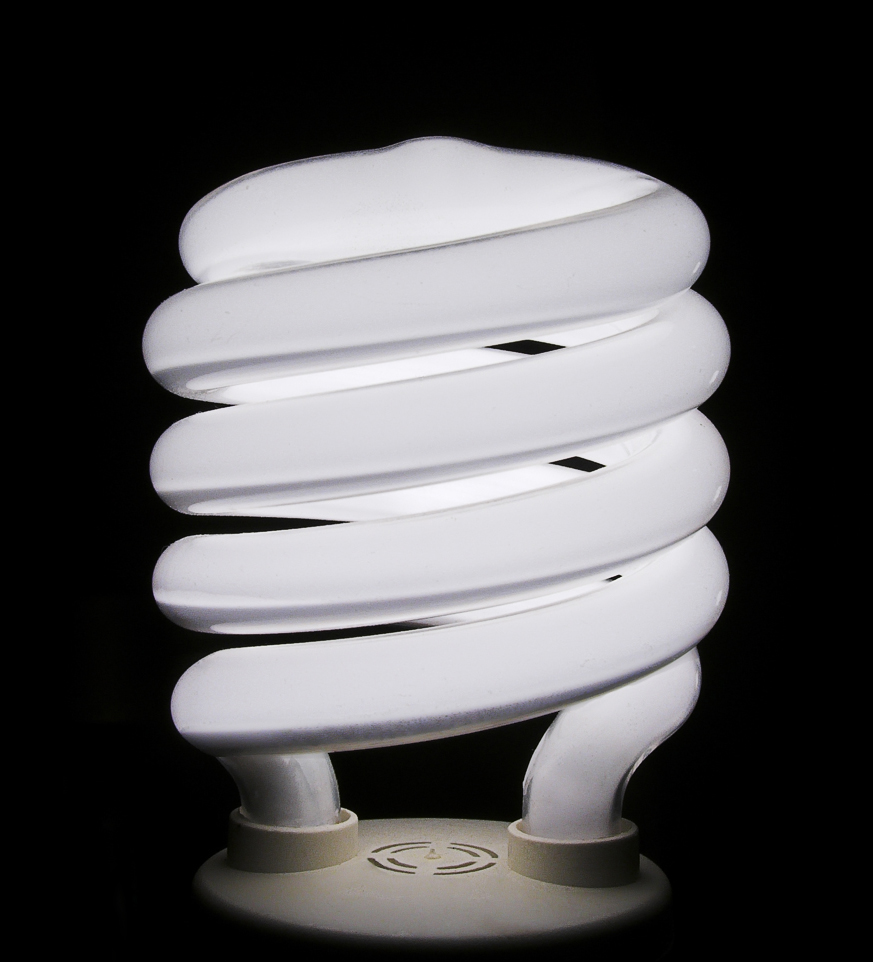
An open (single envelope) CFL

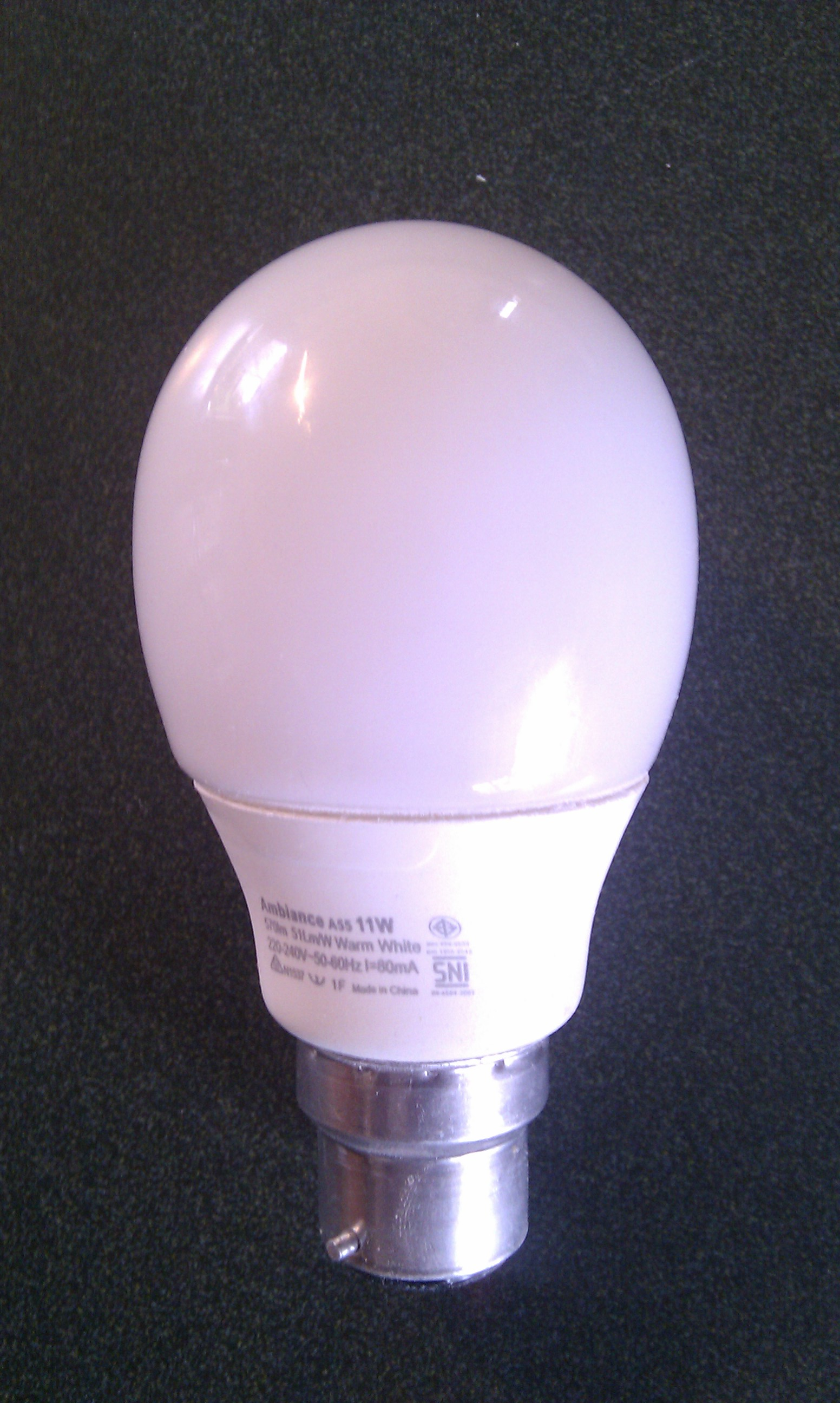
An encapsulated/closed (double envelope) CFL

Some fluorescent lamps emit ultraviolet radiation. The Health Protection Agency of the United Kingdom has conducted research concluding that exposure to open (single envelope) compact fluorescent lamps (CFLs) for over 1 hour per day at a distance of less than 30 cm can exceed guideline levels as recommended by the International Commission on Non-Ionizing Radiation Protection (ICNIRP).

Not all open CFLs produce significant UV emissions. However, close proximity to bare skin can result in exposure levels similar to direct sunlight. The Health Protection Agency of the United Kingdom recommend that in situations requiring close proximity to the light source, open (single envelope) CFLs be replaced with encapsulated (double envelope) CFLs.

In 2009, Natural Resources Canada released a report describing the possible UV exposure from several types of lamps. The report states that at 3 cm distance, the recommended daily exposure to ultraviolet radiation for skin and eye damage (if looking directly at the lamp) was attained between 50 minutes and 5 hours depending on the type of lamp. The report observes that such a close distance is unlikely in actual use. The report also states that most bare-spiral lamps tested gave off more UV than the 60 watt incandescent lamp tested, but that the encapsulated (double envelope) CFLs emitted less UV radiation. At 30 cm distance, the recommended maximum daily exposure was attained between 3 hours and 6 hours, with little difference between the studied 60 watt incandescent lamp and any bare-spiral CFL. The report states that the threshold limit values used represent otherwise healthy individuals who are not experiencing any hypersensitivity conditions or exposed to substances that increase UV sensitivity. Outdoor sunlight can supply the maximum recommended daily UV exposure in 20 to 100 minutes.

== SCENIHR study and report ==
The Scientific Committee on Emerging and Newly Identified Health Risks (SCENIHR) in 2008 reviewed the connections between artificial light and numerous human diseases. The abstract of the report states that no suitable scientific evidence was available of a relationship between fluorescent lighting and several diseases in humans. The abstract states that in the worst case 0.05% of the European Union population have light-sensitivity conditions that may be affected by blue light or UV emitted by artificial light sources. The abstract further notes that double-walled lamps would reduce UV emissions of concern to sensitive individuals.

Self-reporting suggests fluorescent lamps aggravate dyslexia, but tests show that dyslexic patients are unable to detect flicker emanating from light sources. This opinion was updated by SCENIHR in 2012, with no significant changes from the opinion of 2008.

== Mercury ==
Fluorescent bulbs contain mercury, a toxic substance. The United States Environmental Protection Agency (EPA) provides safety guidelines for how to clean up a broken fluorescent bulb. Mercury can be harmful to children and developing fetuses, so children and pregnant women should avoid being in the area whilst a broken bulb is cleaned up.

Bulbs which have reached the end of their life should not be disposed of in normal trash, as this may release the mercury into the environment if the bulb is damaged. Several countries have specialised recycling or disposal systems for fluorescent bulbs. According to the U.S. Environmental Protection Agency (EPA), the amount of mercury contained in a compact fluorescent lamp (about 4–5 mg) is approximately 1% of the amount found in a single dental amalgam filling or old-style glass thermometer. Some linear fluorescent lamps contain reduced mercury (as low as 1.7 mg) and are typically termed as "Green" and are recognizable by their green caps/tips.

The U.S. EPA states that using energy-efficient CFLs reduces demand for power, which reduces the amount of coal burned by power plants and hence reduces the amount of mercury emitted from coal fired power plants.

== Other conditions associated with fluorescent light ==
In rare cases individuals with solar urticaria (allergy to sunlight) can get a rash from fluorescent lighting, although this is true of any source of light. Very photosensitive individuals with systemic lupus erythematosus may experience disease activity under artificial light. Standard acrylic diffusers over the fluorescent lamps absorb nearly all the UV-B radiation and appear to protect against this.

One paper suggested that in rare cases, fluorescent lighting can also induce depersonalization and derealization; subsequently, it can worsen depersonalization disorder symptoms.

The charity Migraine Action Association reported concerns from members that CFL bulbs can cause migraines, and there are many anecdotal reports of such occurrences.

Although it is possible to retrofit with electronic ballasts, many fluorescent lighting installations retain older ballasts containing toxic polychlorinated biphenyls.
