= Frances Hoggan =

Welsh medical doctor

- Born: Frances Elizabeth Morgan; 20 December 1843; Brecon, Wales
- Died: 5 February 1927 (aged 83); Brighton, Sussex, England
- Citizenship: British
- Occupation: Physician

Frances Elizabeth Hoggan (née Morgan; 20 December 1843 – 5 February 1927) was a Welsh doctor. In 1870 she became the first woman from the UK to receive a doctorate in medicine from any university in Europe. She was a pioneering medical practitioner, researcher and social reformer – and the first female doctor to be registered in Wales. She and her husband opened the first husband-and-wife medical practice in Britain. She was honoured with Wales' 11th Purple Plaque in her birth-town of Brecon in March 2023.

== Early life and education ==
Frances Morgan was born in Brecon, Wales, where her father, Richard Morgan, was a curate in Brecon Cathedral. She was brought up in Aberafan, then educated at Cowbridge in Glamorgan and later at Windsor. During her teens, she gave birth to an illegitimate daughter, who was brought up by her mother Georgiana Catherina (née Philipps) and passed off as Frances' sister. She went on to study at Paris and Düsseldorf.

Following the exclusion of women from its professional exams by the Council of the Worshipful Society of Apothecaries in 1867, Morgan sought her medical education at the University of Zurich, where Nadezhda Suslova, Russia's first woman physician, had received her degree in December 1867. Morgan completed the medical course in three years rather than the expected five, and in March 1870, became only the second woman to gain an MD (with a thesis on progressive muscular atrophy) at Zürich University. Afterwards, at a clinic in Vienna she undertook study on operative midwifery and became a pupil of surgeon Gustav Braun.

Morgan earned her medical doctorate from the University of Zurich in March 1870, completing the six-year course in three years, becoming the first British woman to obtain a European MD degree.

== Career ==
Following her graduation, Morgan did post-graduate work at top medical schools in Vienna, Prague and Paris before returning to Britain. She spent several years as a medical practitioner working with Elizabeth Garrett Anderson at the New Hospital for Women in London. She also helped to found the National Health Society with Elizabeth Blackwell in 1871. Its purpose was to "promote health amongst all classes of the population".

In 1874, Frances Morgan married Dr George Hoggan and adopted his surname. She earned her licence to practice medicine in the UK from The King's and Queen's College of Physicians of Ireland in February 1877.

Together with her husband, she opened the first husband-and-wife general medical practice in the UK. They both wrote medical research papers over the next decade, some of which were co-authored.

In 1882, she called for a publicly funded women's medical service for female patients in India, where religious and social practices made it difficult for some women to consult male doctors. This helped pave the way for the Dufferin Fund. In the same year she became medical superintendent at the North London Collegiate School, one of the first rigorously academic secondary schools for girls. She held this role for six years.

In 1884, Frances Hoggan wrote a paper called 'The Position of the Mother of the Family', using the latest understanding about conception and reproduction to argue that mothers should have more rights over their children.

Hoggan and her husband George were anti-vivisectionists and opponents of compulsory vaccination. In an article for the Vaccination Inquirer in September 1883 they both argued against compulsory vaccination. George became ill in 1885 and the couple moved to the south of France. George died of a cerebral tumour in 1891.

Hoggan became a campaigner and social reformer, and toured the United States lecturing. She had a particular interest in racial issues, and was a speaker at the Universal Race Congress in London in 1911.

== Death and legacy ==
Frances Hoggan died in 1927. Her cremated remains are buried, with her husband's, in Woking cemetery.

The Learned Society of Wales awards the Frances Hoggan Medal to outstanding women connected with Wales in the areas of science, medicine, engineering, technology or mathematics.

On 3 March 2023 a plaque was placed at her birthplace in Brecon to celebrate Hoggan, with Wales' 11th purple plaque placed to celebrate remarkable women in Wales. Welsh government's social justice minister, Jane Hutt said she hoped the plaque would "make sure her name is elevated to the status she deserves".

== Selected works ==
- Education for Girls in Wales (1882) printed by Women's Printing Society
- American Negro Women During Their First Fifty Years of Freedom (1913)

== See also ==
=== Welsh ===
- Mary Elizabeth Phillips (physician)
- Mary Morris (doctor)
- List of Welsh medical pioneers

=== Other ===
- Elizabeth Blackwell
- Elizabeth Garrett Anderson
- Nadezhda Suslova
- Edinburgh Seven
