= Migraine Trust =

British charity

The Migraine Trust is a British registered charity (no. 1081300), whose aim is to "empower, inform, and support those affected by migraine, while educating health professionals and actively funding and disseminating research". It was founded in 1965 and is part of the Headache UK alliance.

The other members of the Headache UK alliance are OUCH (UK) (the Organisation for the Understanding of Cluster Headache), the Migraine Action Association, the British Association for the Study of Headache (BASH) and Migraine in Primary Care Advisors.
