= Medical Act 1876 =

Act of the Parliament of the United Kingdom

Medical Act 1876 (Note: The citation of this act by this short title was authorised by section 1 of, and the first schedule to, the Short Titles Act 1896. Due to the repeal of those provisions it is now authorised by section 19(2) of the Interpretation Act 1978.)
- Act of Parliament
- Parliament of the United Kingdom
- Long title: An Act to remove Restrictions on the granting of Qualifications for Registration under the Medical Act on the ground of Sex.
- Citation: 39 & 40 Vict. c. 41
- Territorial extent: United Kingdom

Dates
- Royal assent: 11 August 1876
- Commencement: 11 August 1876 (Note: The Acts of Parliament (Commencement) Act 1793.)
- Repealed: 27 May 1976
Other legislation
Repealed by	Statute Law (Repeals) Act 1976

Status: Repealed

Text of statute as originally enacted

The Medical Act 1876 (39 & 40 Vict. c. 41), or the Enabling Act 1876 or Russell Gurney Act, was an act of the Parliament of the United Kingdom which repealed the previous Medical Act in the United Kingdom and allowed all British medical authorities to license all qualified applicants whatever their gender. It was introduced by Member of Parliament Russell Gurney. The act obtained royal assent and became law despite Queen Victoria's strong private objections to women's medical training.

The Medical Acts was the collective title of the Medical Act 1876 as well as the following acts:

- Medical Act 1858 (21 & 22 Vict. c. 90)
- Medical Act 1859 (22 Vict. c. 21)
- Medical Acts Amendment Act 1860 (23 & 24 Vict. c. 7)
- Medical Practitioners Act 1876 (39 & 40 Vict. c. 40)
- Medical Act 1886 (49 & 50 Vict. c. 48)

== Subsequent developments ==
The whole act was repealed by section 1(1) of, and part X of schedule 1 to, the Statute Law (Repeals) Act 1976, which came into force on 27 May 1976.
