= Migraine Action Association =

UK charity

Migraine Action (MA) was the UK's leading charity offering support and advisory information to those affected by migraine, whether individuals, families, employers or employees and medical professionals. It closed in 2018.

== History ==
The association was founded in 1958 by Peter Wilson and a group of people who suffered from migraines, under the name British Migraine Association. It was a member of the Headache UK alliance. Its office was based in Leicester but MA was a national organization, helping the one in seven people estimated to be affected by migraine across the UK, including 10% of school-aged children. The charity ran a telephone helpline and had over a hundred Department of Health-accredited leaflets on all aspects of migraine. It also ran a specialist headache nurse service, had websites for adults and children with migraine, ran information and support events around the UK and helped to fund research into migraine and to support the work of specialist migraine centres.

The organisation was the subject of a BBC Radio 4 Appeal 7 June 2015, presented by Sarah Jarvis. Migraine Action closed in 2018 and donated its assets to the Migraine Trustin 2019.

Migraine Action held four art competitions from 1980 to 1987, asking people who had migraines to depict their experiences. Over 500 works were submitted, mostly by people with no art experience. When the charity closed, the collection was given to the Wellcome Collection. The works are available to view online at the collection's website.
