= Elizabeth Garrett Anderson =

English physician, doctor and feminist (1836–1917)

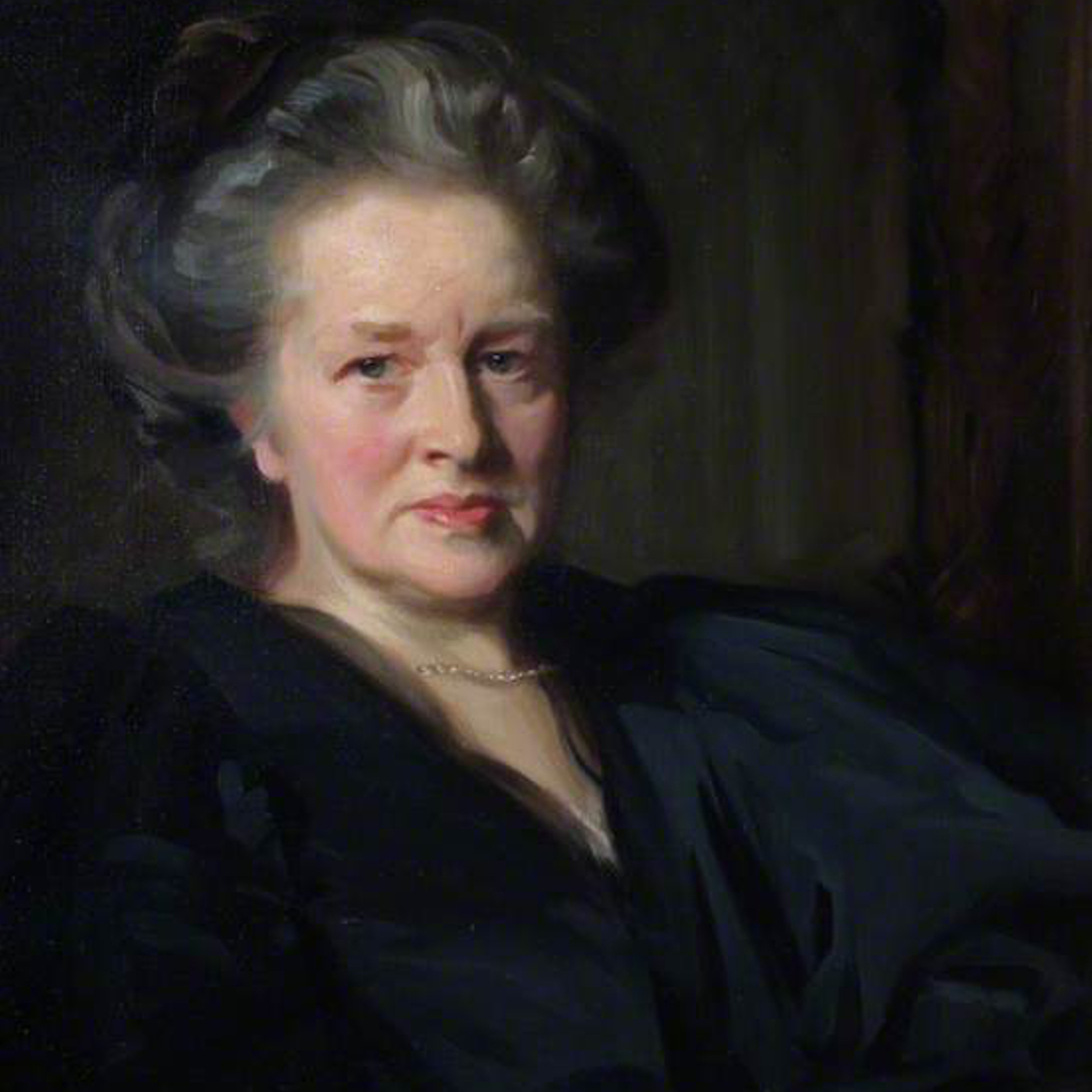
- Detail from a portrait of Garrett Anderson circa 1900
- Born: Elizabeth Garrett; 9 June 1836; Whitechapel, London, England
- Died: 17 December 1917 (aged 81); Aldeburgh, Suffolk, England
- Education: Studied privately with physicians in London hospitals Society of Apothecaries
- Known for: First woman to gain a medical qualification in Britain; Creating a medical school for women
- Relatives: Louisa Garrett Anderson (daughter); Alan Garrett Anderson (son); Newson Garrett (father); Agnes Garrett (sister); Millicent Garrett Fawcett (sister)
- Medical career
- Profession: Physician
- Institutions: New Hospital for Women; London School of Medicine for Women

Elizabeth Garrett Anderson (9 June 1836 – 17 December 1917) was an English physician and suffragist. She is known for being the first woman to qualify in Britain as a physician and surgeon and as a co-founder and dean of the London School of Medicine for Women, which was the first medical school in Britain to train women as doctors. She was the first female dean of a British medical school, the first woman in Britain to be elected to a school board and, as mayor of Aldeburgh, the first female mayor in Britain.

== Early life ==
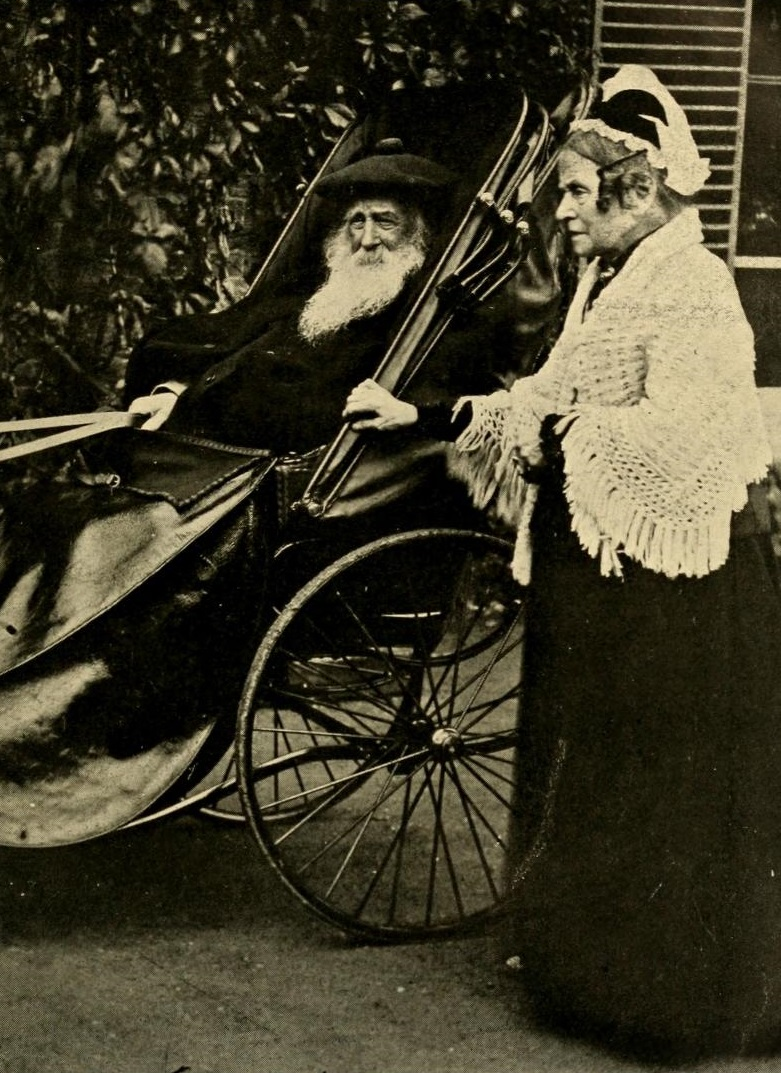
Her parents, Newson and Louisa Garrett in their old age; from What I Remember by Millicent Garrett Fawcett

Elizabeth was born in Whitechapel, London, and was the second of eleven children of Newson Garrett (1812–1893), from Leiston, Suffolk, and his wife, Louisa (born Dunnell; c. 1813–1903), from London.

Her paternal ancestors had been ironworkers in East Suffolk since the early seventeenth century. Newson was the youngest of three sons and not academically inclined, although he possessed the family's entrepreneurial spirit. When he finished school, Newson found few opportunities in Leiston, so he moved to London to make his fortune. There, he fell in love with his brother's sister-in-law, Louisa Dunnell, the daughter of an innkeeper of Suffolk origin. After their wedding, the couple went to live in a pawnbroker's shop at 1 Commercial Road, Whitechapel. The Garretts had their first three children in quick succession: Louisa, Elizabeth, and a son, Dunnell, who died at the age of six months. When Garrett was three years old, the family moved to 142 Long Acre, where they lived for two years, while one more child was born and her father advanced in his career, becoming not only the manager of a larger pawnbroker's shop, but also a silversmith. Garrett's grandfather, owner of the family engineering works, Richard Garrett & Sons, had died in 1837, leaving the business to his eldest son, Garrett's uncle. Despite his lack of capital, Newson was determined to be successful and in 1841, at the age of 29, he moved his family to Suffolk, where he bought a barley and coal merchants business in Snape, constructing Snape Maltings from 1846.

The Garretts lived in a square Georgian house opposite the church in Aldeburgh until 1852. Newson's malting business expanded and more children were born, Edmund (1840), Alice (1842), Agnes (1845), Millicent (1847), who was to become a leader in the constitutional campaign for women's suffrage, Sam (1850), Josephine (1853) and George (1854). By 1850, Newson was a prosperous businessman and was able to build Alde House, a mansion on a hill behind Aldeburgh. A "by-product of the industrial revolution", Garrett grew up in an atmosphere of "triumphant economic pioneering" and the Garrett children were to grow up to become achievers in the professional classes of late-Victorian England. Elizabeth was encouraged to take an interest in local politics and, contrary to practices at the time, was allowed the freedom to explore the town with its nearby salt-marshes, beach and the small port of Slaughden with its boatbuilders' yards and sailmakers' lofts.

== Early education ==
There was no school in Aldeburgh, so Garrett learned reading, writing, and arithmetic from her mother. When she was 10 years old, a governess, Miss Edgeworth, a poor gentlewoman, was employed to educate Garrett and her sister. Mornings were spent in the schoolroom; there were regimented afternoon walks; educating the young ladies continued at mealtimes when Edgeworth ate with the family; at night, the governess slept in a curtained off area in the girls' bedroom. Garrett reportedly despised her governess and sought to outwit the teacher in the classroom. When Garrett was 13 and her sister 15, they were sent to a private school, the Boarding School for Ladies in Blackheath, London, which was run by the step aunts of the poet Robert Browning. There, English literature, French, Italian and German as well as deportment, were taught.

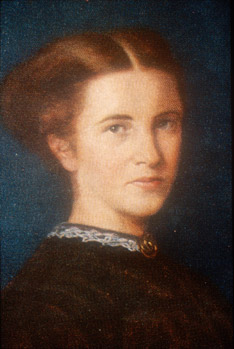
A portrait of Garrett in the 1860s

Later in life, Garrett recalled the stupidity of her teachers there, though her schooling there did help establish a love of reading. Her main complaint about the school was the lack of science and mathematics instruction. Her reading there included works of Tennyson, Wordsworth, Milton, Coleridge, Trollope, Thackeray and George Eliot. Elizabeth and Louie were known as "the bathing Garretts", as their father had insisted they be allowed a hot bath once a week. However, they made what were to be lifelong friends there. When they finished in 1851, they were sent on a short tour abroad, ending with a memorable visit to the Great Exhibition in Hyde Park, London.

After this formal education, Garrett spent the next nine years tending to domestic duties, but she continued to study Latin and arithmetic in the mornings and also read widely. Her sister Millicent recalled Garrett's weekly lectures, "Talks on Things in General", when her younger siblings would gather while she discussed politics and current affairs from Garibaldi to Macaulay's History of England. In 1854, when she was eighteen, Garrett and her sister went on a long visit to their school friends, Jane and Anne Crow, in Gateshead where she met Emily Davies, the early feminist and future co-founder of Girton College, Cambridge. Davies was to be a lifelong friend and confidante, always ready to give sound advice during the important decisions of Garrett's career. It may have been in the English Woman's Journal, first issued in 1858, that Garrett first read of Elizabeth Blackwell, who had become the first female doctor in the United States in 1849. When Blackwell visited London in 1859, Garrett travelled to the capital. By then, her sister Louie was married and living in London. Garrett joined the Society for Promoting the Employment of Women, which organised Blackwell's lectures on "Medicine as a Profession for Ladies" and set up a private meeting between Garrett and the doctor. It is said that during a visit to Alde House around 1860, one evening while sitting by the fireside, Garrett and Davies selected careers for advancing the frontiers of women's rights; Garrett was to open the medical profession to women, Davies the doors to a university education for women, while 13-year-old Millicent was allocated politics and votes for women. At first Newson was opposed to the radical idea of his daughter becoming a physician but came round and agreed to do all in his power, both financially and otherwise, to support Garrett.

== Medical education ==
After an initial unsuccessful visit to leading doctors in Harley Street, Garrett decided to first spend six months as a surgery nurse at Middlesex Hospital, London in August 1860. On proving to be a good nurse, she was allowed to attend an outpatients' clinic, then her first operation. She unsuccessfully attempted to enroll in the hospital's Medical School but was allowed to attend private tuition in Latin, Greek and pharmacology with the hospital's apothecary, while continuing her work as a nurse. She also employed a tutor to study anatomy and physiology three evenings a week. Eventually she was allowed into the dissecting room and the chemistry lectures. Gradually, Garrett became an unwelcome presence among the male students, who in 1861 presented a memorial to the school against her admittance as a fellow student, despite the support she enjoyed from the administration. She was obliged to leave the Middlesex Hospital but she did so with an honours certificate in chemistry and materia medica. Garrett then applied to several medical schools, including Oxford, Cambridge, Glasgow, Edinburgh, St Andrews and the Royal College of Surgeons, all of which refused her admittance.

A companion to Garrett in this effort was the lesser known Sophia Jex-Blake. While both are considered "outstanding" medical figures of the late 19th century, Garrett was able to obtain her credentials by way of a "side door" through a loophole in admissions at the Worshipful Society of Apothecaries. Having privately obtained a certificate in anatomy and physiology, she was admitted in 1862 by the Society of Apothecaries who, as a condition of their charter, could not legally exclude her on account of her sex. She was the only woman in the Apothecaries Hall who sat the exam that year. Among the 51 male candidates was William Heath Strange, who went on to found the Hampstead General Hospital, which was on the site now occupied by the Royal Free Hospital. She continued her battle to qualify by studying privately with various professors, including some at the University of St Andrews, the Edinburgh Royal Maternity and the London Hospital Medical School.

Elizabeth Garrett Anderson 1866.jpg

In 1865, Garrett finally took her exam and obtained a licence (LSA) from the Society of Apothecaries to practise medicine, the first woman qualified in Britain to do so openly (previously there was Dr James Barry who was born and raised female but presented as male from the age of 20). On the day, three out of seven candidates passed the exam, Garrett with the highest marks. The Society of Apothecaries immediately amended its regulations to prevent other women obtaining a licence meaning that Jex-Blake could not follow this same path; the new rule disallowed privately educated women to be eligible for examination. It was not until the Medical Act 1876 (39 & 40 Vict. c. 41) passed, which allowed British medical authorities to license all qualified applicants whatever their gender.

== Career ==
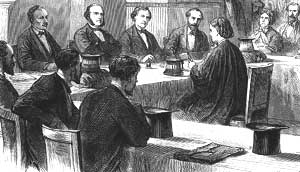
Elizabeth Garrett Anderson before the Faculty of Medicine, Paris

Though she was now a licentiate of the Society of Apothecaries, as a woman, Garrett could not hold a medical post in any hospital. So in late 1865, Garrett opened her own practice at 20 Upper Berkeley Street, London. At first patients were scarce, but the practice gradually grew. After six months in practice, she wished to open an outpatients dispensary, to enable poor women to obtain medical help from a qualified practitioner of their own gender. In 1865, there was an outbreak of cholera in Britain, affecting both rich and poor, and in their panic, some people forgot any prejudices they had in relation to a female physician. The first death due to cholera occurred in 1866, but by then Garrett had already opened St Mary's Dispensary for Women and Children, at 69 Seymour Place. In the first year, she tended to 3,000 new patients, who made 9,300 outpatient visits to the dispensary. On hearing that the Dean of the faculty of medicine at the University of Sorbonne, Paris was in favour of admitting women as medical students, Garrett studied French so that she could apply for a medical degree, which she obtained in 1870 after some difficulty.

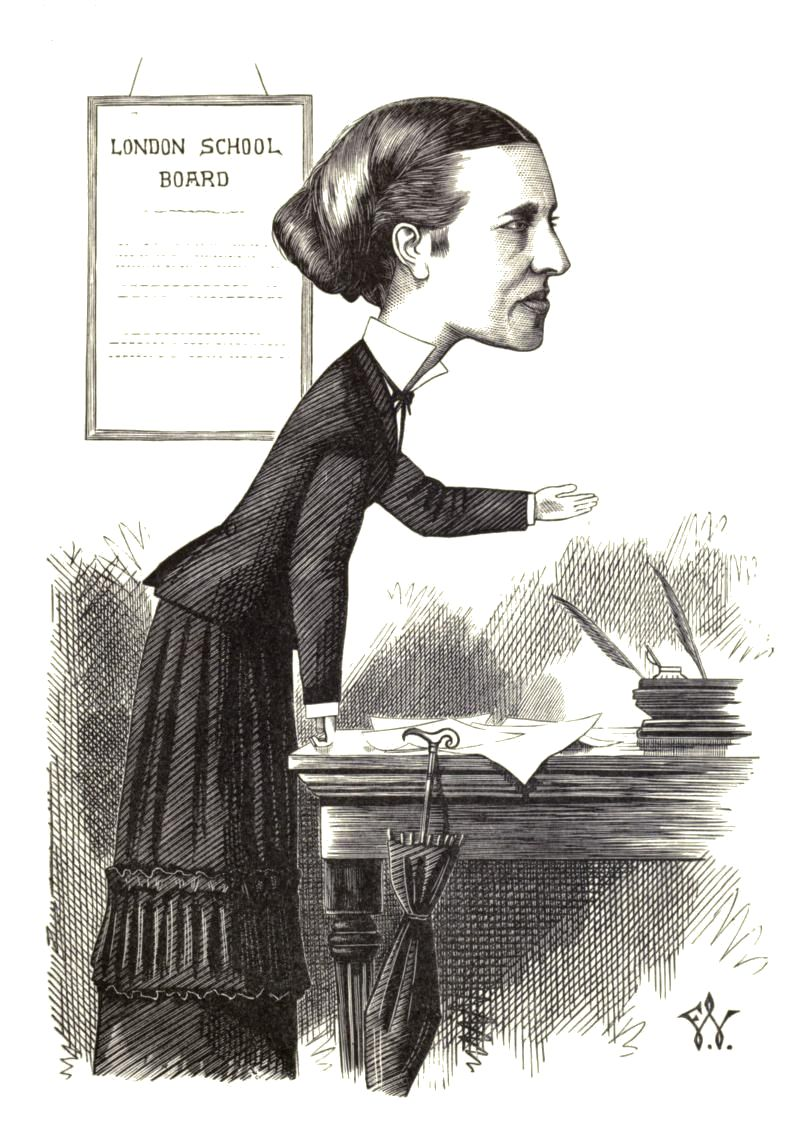
Caricature of Garrett Anderson published in 1872

The same year she was elected to the first London School Board, an office newly opened to women; Garrett's was the highest vote among all the candidates. Also in that year, she was made a visiting physician of the East London Hospital for Children (later the Queen Elizabeth Hospital for Children), becoming the first woman in Britain to be appointed to a medical post, but she found the duties of these two positions to be incompatible with her principal work in her private practice and the dispensary, as well as her role as a new mother, so she resigned from these posts by 1873. In 1872, the dispensary became the New Hospital for Women and Children, treating women from all over London for gynaecological conditions; the hospital moved to new premises in Marylebone Street in 1874. Around this time, Garrett also entered into discussion with male medical views regarding women. In 1874, Henry Maudsley's article on Sex and Mind in Education appeared, which argued that education for women caused over-exertion and thus reduced their reproductive capacity, sometimes causing "nervous and even mental disorders". Garrett's counter-argument was that the real danger for women was not education but boredom and that fresh air and exercise were preferable to sitting by the fire with a novel. In the same year, she co-founded the London School of Medicine for Women with Sophia Jex-Blake and became a lecturer in what was then the only teaching hospital in Britain to offer courses for women. She continued to work there for the rest of her career and was dean of the school from 1883 to 1902. This school was later called the Royal Free Hospital School of Medicine, and became part of the medical school of University College London.

=== BMA membership ===
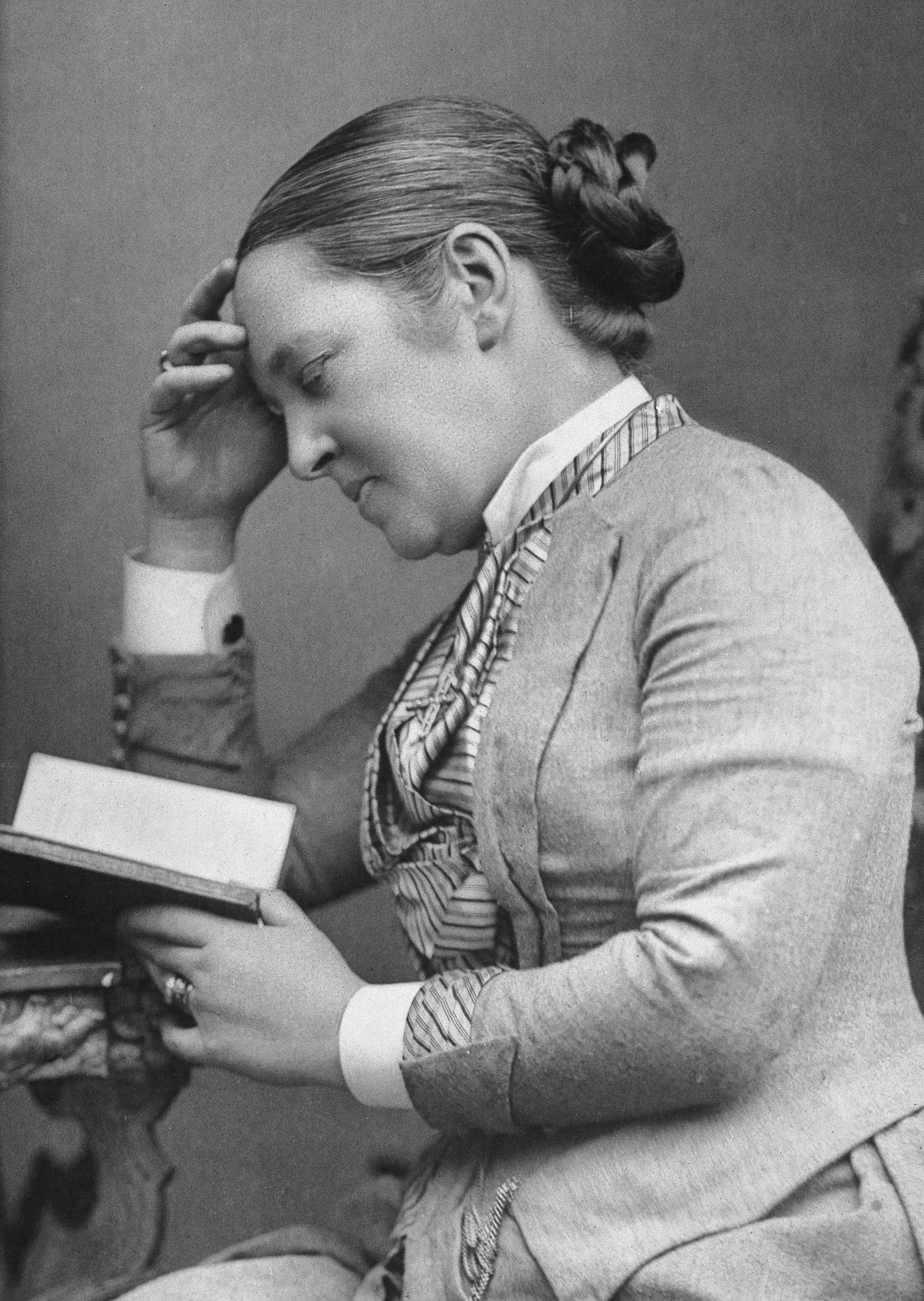
Garrett Anderson circa 1889

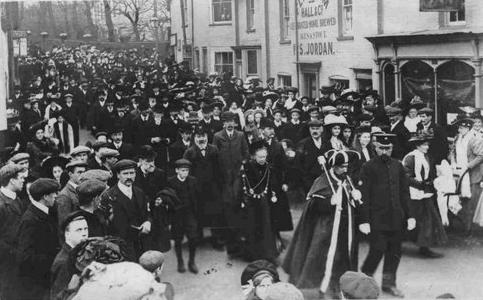
Garrett Anderson as mayor of Aldeburgh, November 1908

In 1873, Garrett gained membership of the British Medical Association (BMA). In 1878, a motion was proposed to exclude women following the election of Garrett Anderson and Frances Hoggan. The motion was opposed by Dr Norman Kerr who maintained the equal rights of members. This was "one of several instances where Garrett, uniquely, was able to enter a hitherto all male medical institution which subsequently moved formally to exclude any women who might seek to follow her." In 1892, women were again admitted to the British Medical Association following a long campaign by Anderson and others. She, along with Dr Sarah Gray and Dr Eliza Walker Dunbar attended the BMA meeting at Nottingham that year, lobbying successfully for the readmission of women to the association. In 1897, Garrett Anderson was elected president of the East Anglian branch of the BMA.

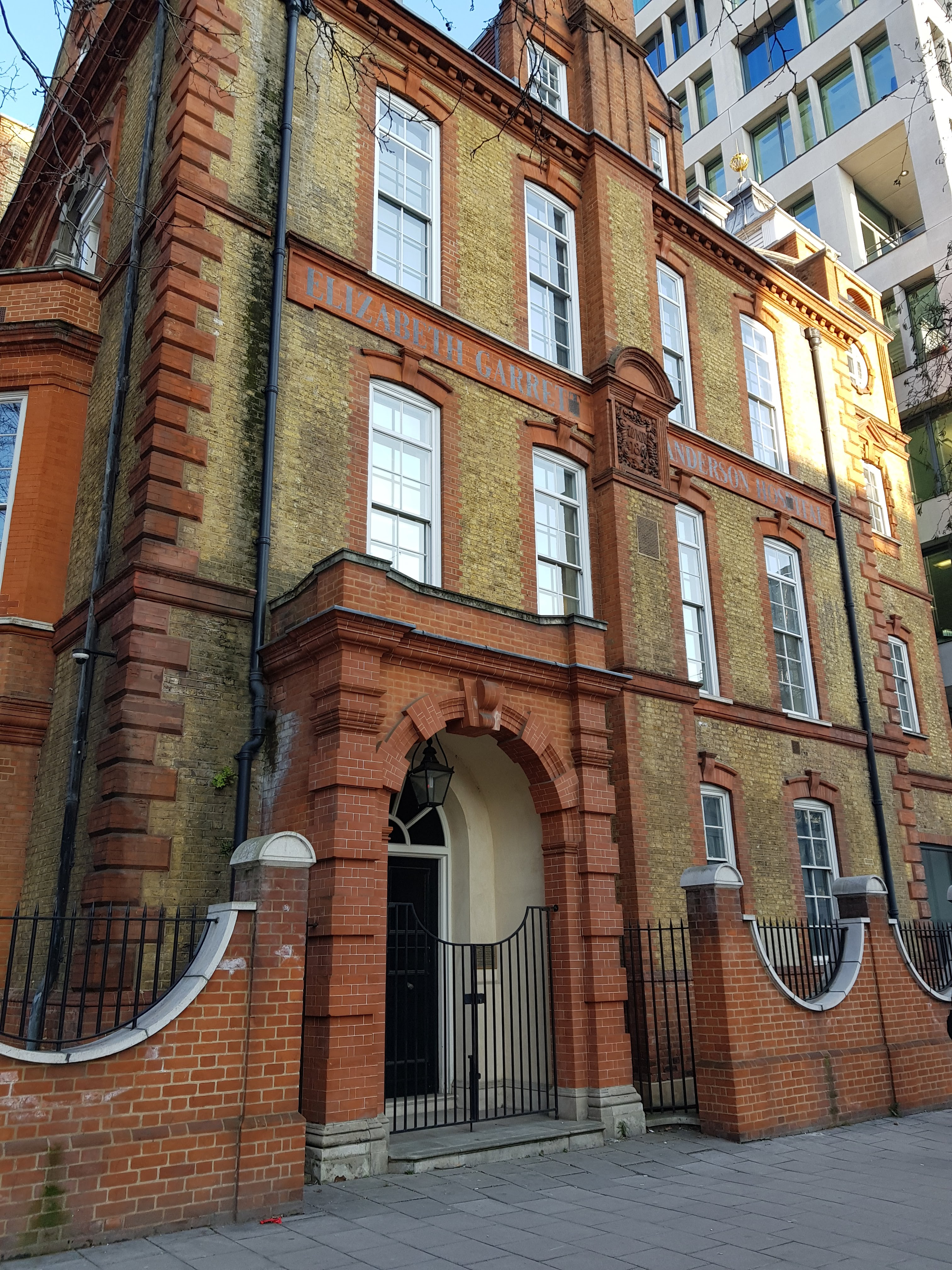
The Hospital for Women, now occupied by Unison, in 2018

Garrett Anderson worked steadily at the development of the New Hospital for Women and Children and in 1874 co-founded and served as dean of the London School of Medicine for Women (LSMW). Both institutions were handsomely and suitably housed and equipped. The New Hospital for Women commissioned a building in the Euston Road; the architect was J. M. Brydon, who took into his employment Anderson's sister Agnes Garrett and her cousin Rhoda Garrett, who contributed to its design. For many years, the hospital was staffed entirely by medical women. The schools (in Hunter Street, WC1) had over 200 students, most of them preparing for the medical degree of London University, which was opened to women in 1877.

== Women’s suffrage movement ==
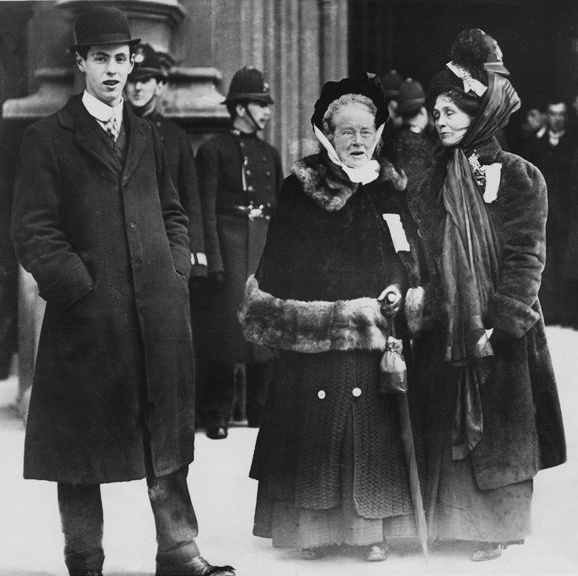
Garrett Anderson with Emmeline Pankhurst on Black Friday, 18 November 1910

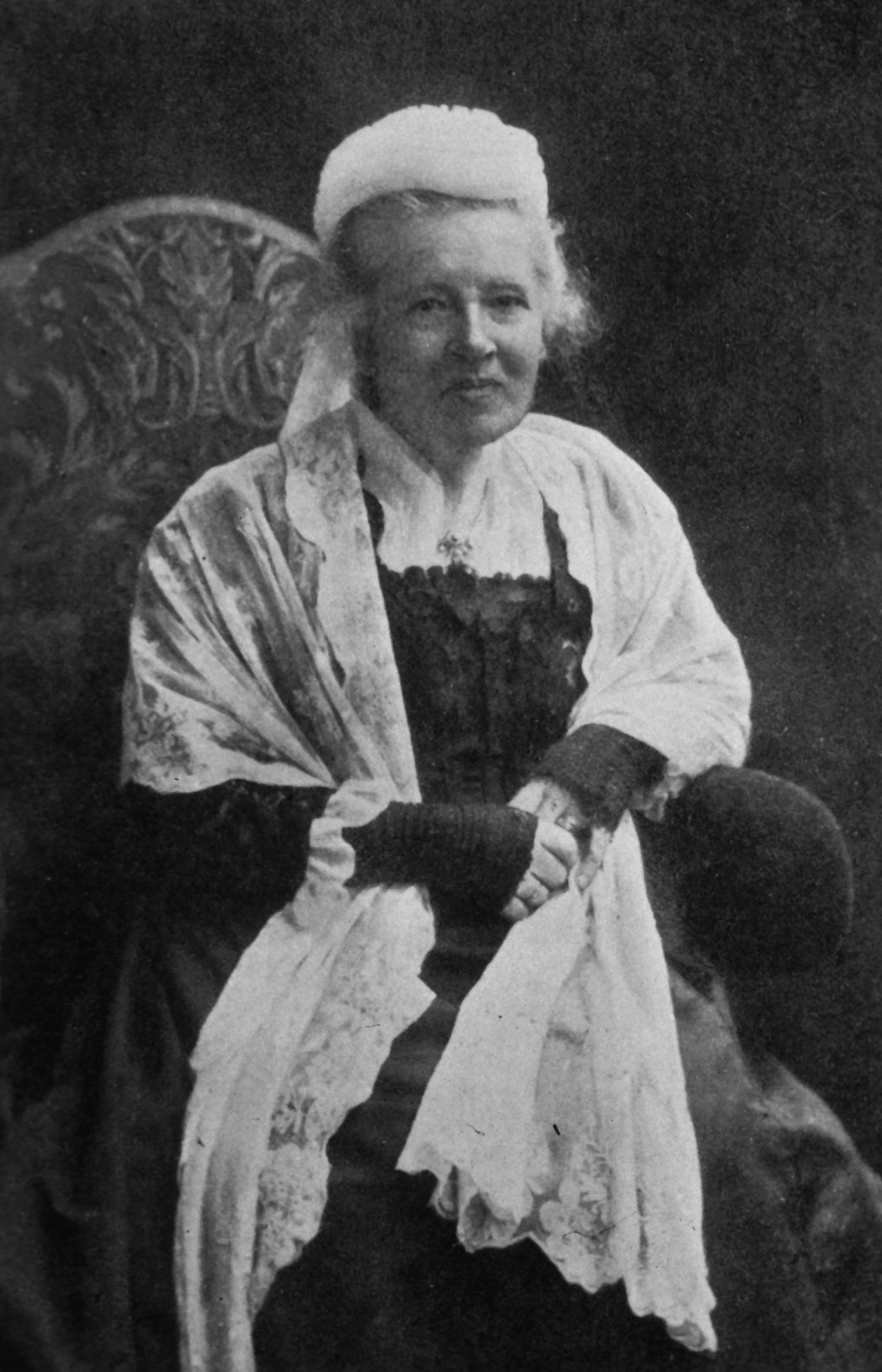
Garrett Anderson

Garrett Anderson was also active in the women's suffrage movement. In 1866, Garrett Anderson and Davies presented petitions with more than 1,500 signatures asking that female heads of household be given the right to vote. That year, Garrett Anderson joined the first British Women's Suffrage Committee. She was not as active as her sister, Millicent Garrett Fawcett, though Garrett Anderson became a member of the Central Committee of the National Society for Women's Suffrage in 1889. After her husband's death in 1907, she became more active. As mayor of Aldeburgh, she gave speeches for suffrage, before the increasing militant activity in the movement led to her withdrawal in 1911. Her daughter Louisa, also a physician, was more active and more militant, spending time in prison in 1912 for her suffrage activities.

== Personal life ==
Elizabeth Garrett Anderson once remarked that "a doctor leads two lives, the professional and the private, and the boundaries between the two are never traversed". In 1871, she married James George Skelton Anderson (died 1907) of the Orient Steam Navigation Company, but she did not give up her medical practice. She had three children, Louisa (1873–1943), Margaret (1874–1875), who died of meningitis, and Alan (1877–1952). Louisa also became a pioneering doctor of medicine and feminist activist.

They retired to Aldeburgh in 1902, moving to Alde House in 1903, after the death of Elizabeth's mother. Skelton died of a stroke in 1907. She enjoyed a happy marriage and in later life, devoted time to Alde House, gardening, and travelling with younger members of the extended family.

On 9 November 1908, she was elected mayor of Aldeburgh, the first female mayor in England. Her father had been mayor in 1889.

She died in 1917 and is buried in the churchyard of St Peter and St Paul's Church, Aldeburgh.

== Legacy ==
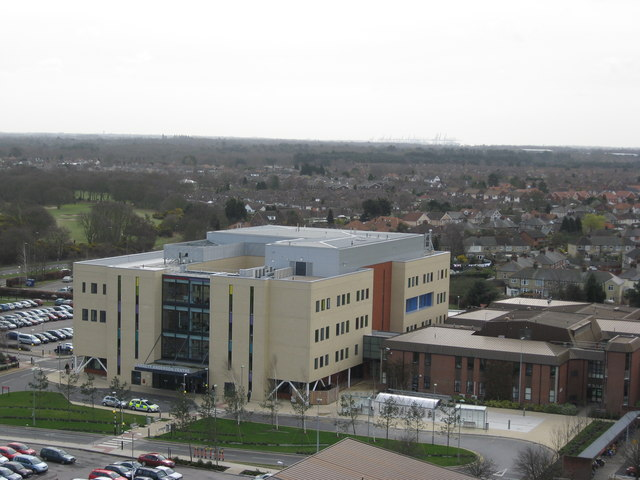
The Garrett Anderson Centre, Ipswich Hospital

The New Hospital for Women was renamed the Elizabeth Garrett Anderson Hospital in 1918 and amalgamated with the Obstetric Hospital in 2001 to form the Elizabeth Garrett Anderson and Obstetric Hospital before relocating to become the University College Hospital Elizabeth Garrett Anderson Wing at UCH.

The former Elizabeth Garrett Anderson Hospital buildings are incorporated into the new National Headquarters for the public service trade union UNISON. The Elizabeth Garrett Anderson Gallery, a permanent installation set within the restored hospital building, uses a variety of media to set the story of Garrett Anderson, her hospital, and women's struggle to achieve equality in the field of medicine within the wider framework of 19th and 20th century social history.

The critical care centre at Ipswich Hospital was named the Garrett Anderson Centre in her honour and in recognition of her connection to the county of Suffolk.

The new medical school at the University of Worcester, due to accept its first students in 2023, is to be called the Elizabeth Garrett Anderson Building.

Elizabeth Garrett Anderson School, a secondary school for girls in Islington, London, is named after her.

The archives of Elizabeth Garrett Anderson are held at the Women's Library at the London School of Economics. The archives of the Elizabeth Garrett Anderson Hospital (formerly the New Hospital for Women) are held at the London Metropolitan Archives.

On 9 June 2016, Google Doodle commemorated her 180th birthday.

Poet Jessy Randall included a tribute to Garrett Anderson in her 2025 collection of poems about women scientists, The Path of Most Resistance.

The Elizabeth Garrett Anderson Programme of the NHS Leadership Academy is a master's degree in leadership and management.
