= Elizabeth Garrett Anderson and Obstetric Hospital =

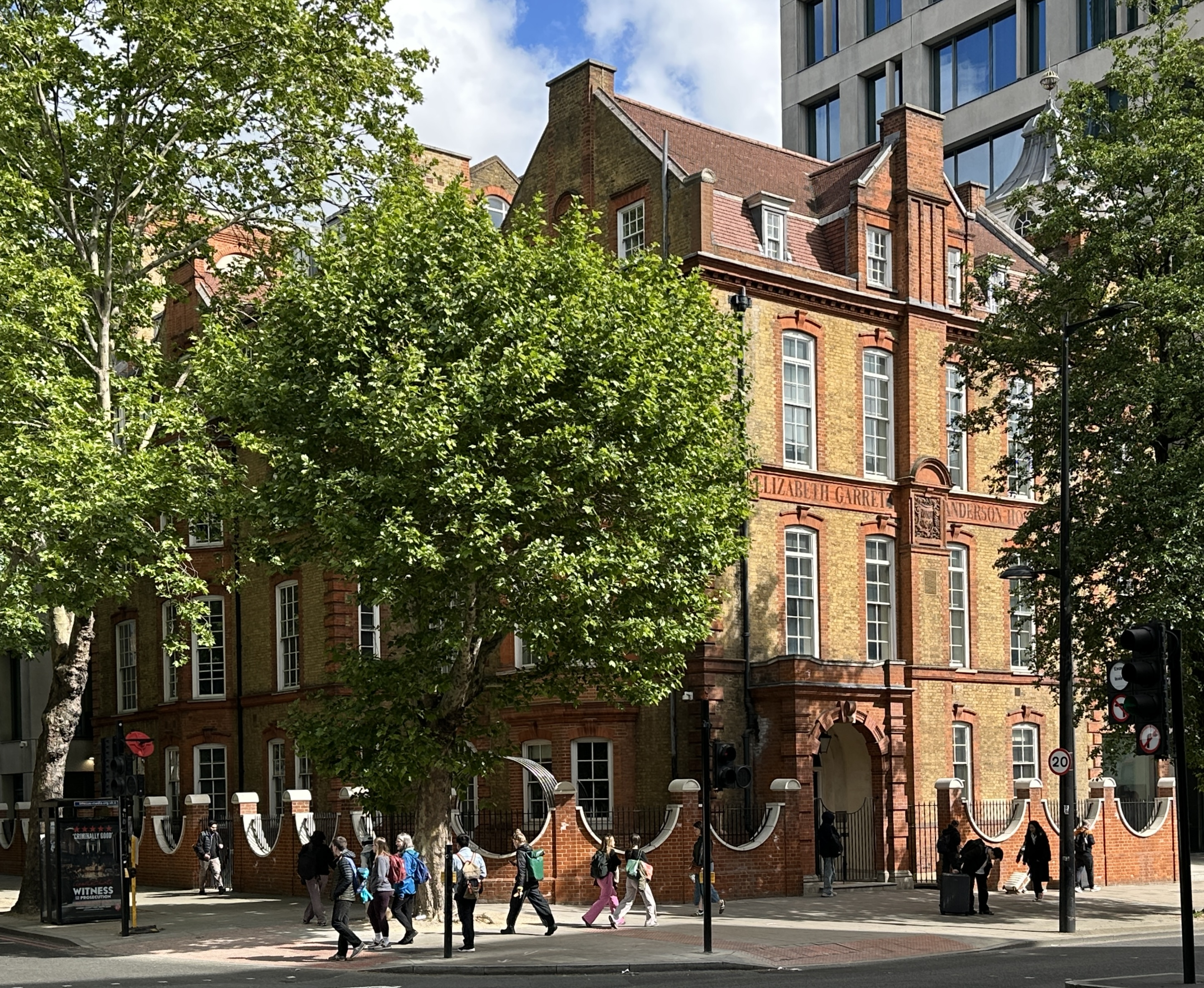
- The former New Hospital for Women, Euston Road, London, now occupied by Unison

- Location within Camden

Geography
- Location: London, NW1; United Kingdom
- Coordinates: 51.52792°N 0.13065°W

Organisation
- Care system: NHS England
- Type: Specialist

Services
- Emergency department: No
- Speciality: Obstetrics

History
- Founded: 1866

The Elizabeth Garrett Anderson and Obstetric Hospital and its predecessor organisations provided health care to women in central London from the mid-Victorian era. It was named after Elizabeth Garrett Anderson, one of Britain's first female physicians, and its work continues in the modern Elizabeth Garrett Anderson wing of University College Hospital, part of UCLH NHS Foundation Trust.

== History ==
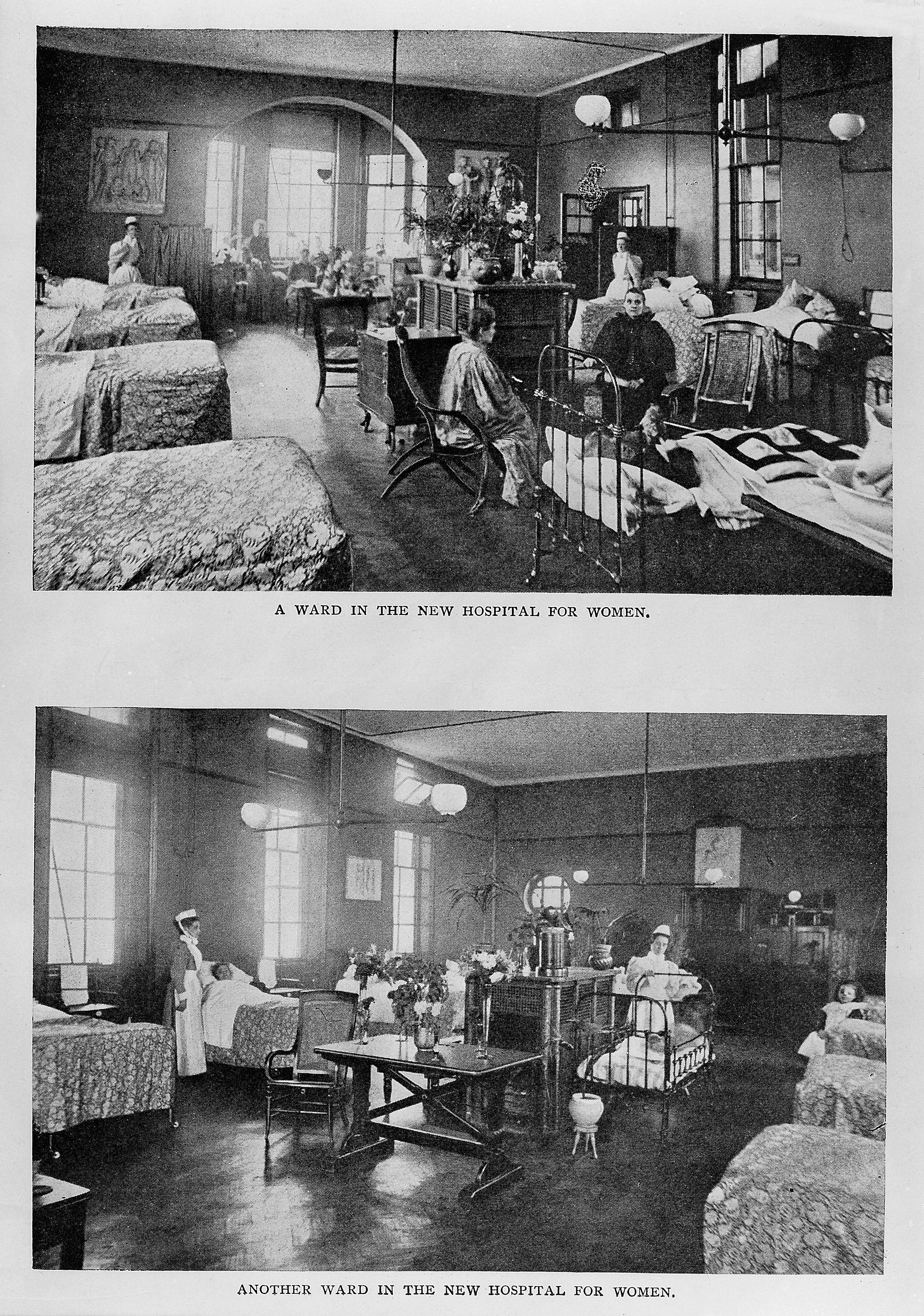
Two wards of the New Hospital for Women. From a magazine of 1899.

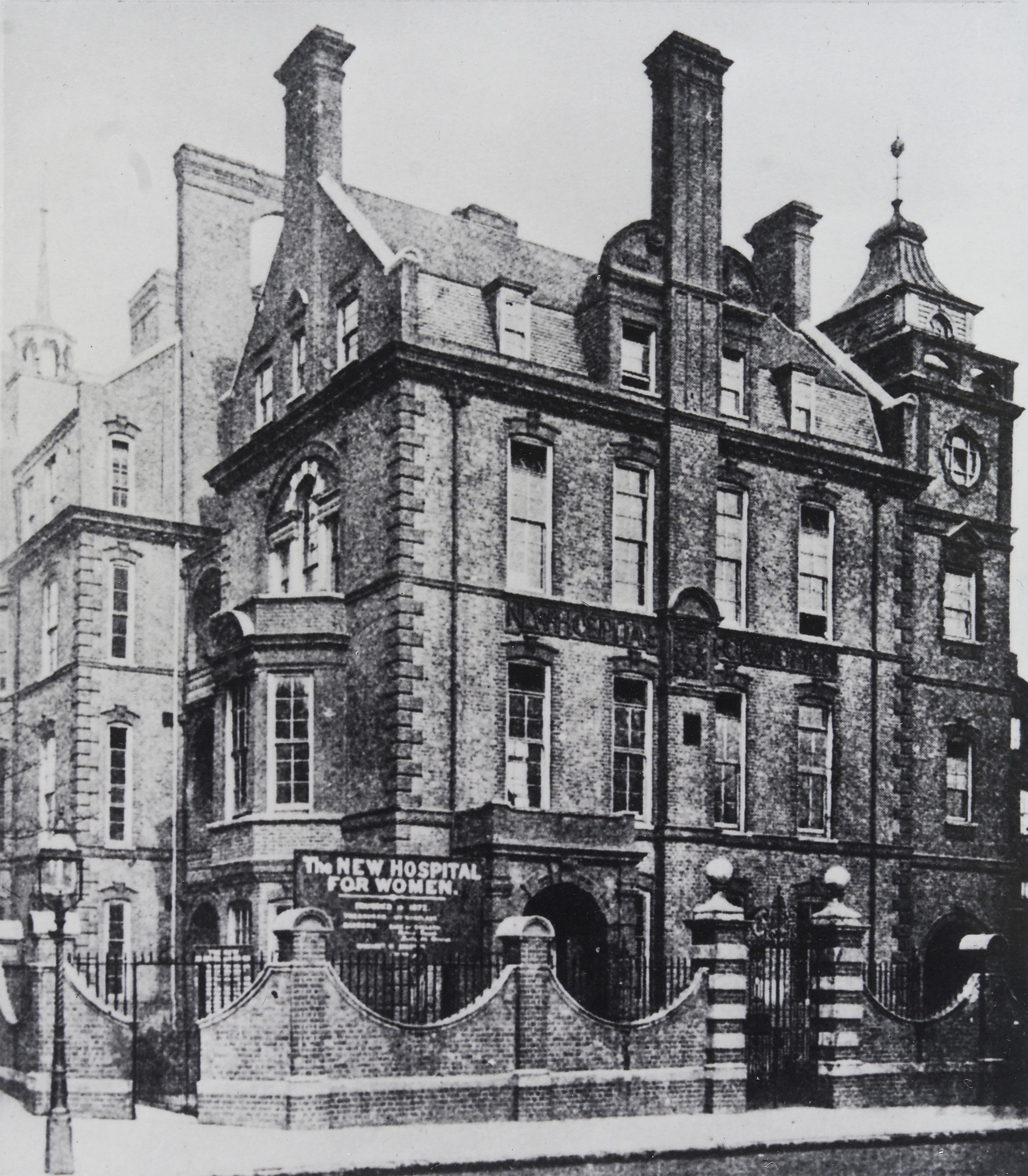
Photograph showing The New Hospital for Women, Euston Road, London, which opened in 1890 with 42 beds.

In 1866, Elizabeth Garrett Anderson, with financial backing from her father, founded and became General Medical Attendant to St Mary's Dispensary in Seymour Place, where she worked for over 20 years. This dispensary developed into the New Hospital for Women in 1872. It was established to enable poor women to obtain medical help from qualified female practitioners - in that era a very unusual thing. In 1874 it moved to Marylebone Road, on a site now occupied by The Landmark Hotel. The foundation stone for new purpose-built facilities in Euston Road was laid by the Princess of Wales in 1889. The architect was J. M. Brydon, who took into his employment at this time Anderson's sister Agnes Garrett and her cousin Rhoda Garrett, who contributed to its design. The hospital was renamed the Elizabeth Garrett Anderson Hospital in 1918, in the year following the death of the pioneer physician.

In 1946 the hospital purchased the Hampstead Nursing Home at 40 Belsize Grove (close to Belsize Park Underground station). Between 1948 and 1977 the property in Belsize Grove was known as the Garrett Anderson Maternity Home. The building was subsequently demolished and replaced by residential accommodation.

The Elizabeth Garrett Anderson hospital in Euston Road was under threat of closure from the 1960s and closure was announced in 1976 by Camden Area Health Authority. In November that year the building was occupied by the staff. Campaigning continued until 1979.

In January 2001 the Elizabeth Garrett Anderson Hospital amalgamated with the Obstetric Hospital to form the Elizabeth Garrett Anderson and Obstetric Hospital: it moved to Huntley Street at the same time.

In November 2008, the hospital's maternity and neonatal services moved to the new University College Hospital Elizabeth Garrett Anderson Wing, a £70 million purpose-built wing offering the latest technology and facilities, and the old building in Huntley Street was demolished to make room for the UCH Macmillan Cancer Centre, which opened in April 2012.

== Elizabeth Garrett Anderson Gallery ==
The 1890 core of the former Elizabeth Garrett Anderson Hospital building in Euston Road has been listed and, restored, now forms part of the UNISON Centre. Within this building the Elizabeth Garrett Anderson Gallery is open to the public. The gallery is a permanent installation and uses a variety of media to tell the story of Elizabeth Garrett Anderson, her hospital, and women's struggle to achieve equality in the field of medicine within the wider framework of 19th and 20th century social history. Interactive displays allow the visitor to discover more about the "Enterprising Women" who followed Elizabeth Garrett into the medical profession – and into other spheres of British public life.

== See also ==
- London School of Medicine for Women
- South London Hospital for Women and Children
- List of hospitals in England
