= Frances Helen Prideaux =

British physician (1858–1885)

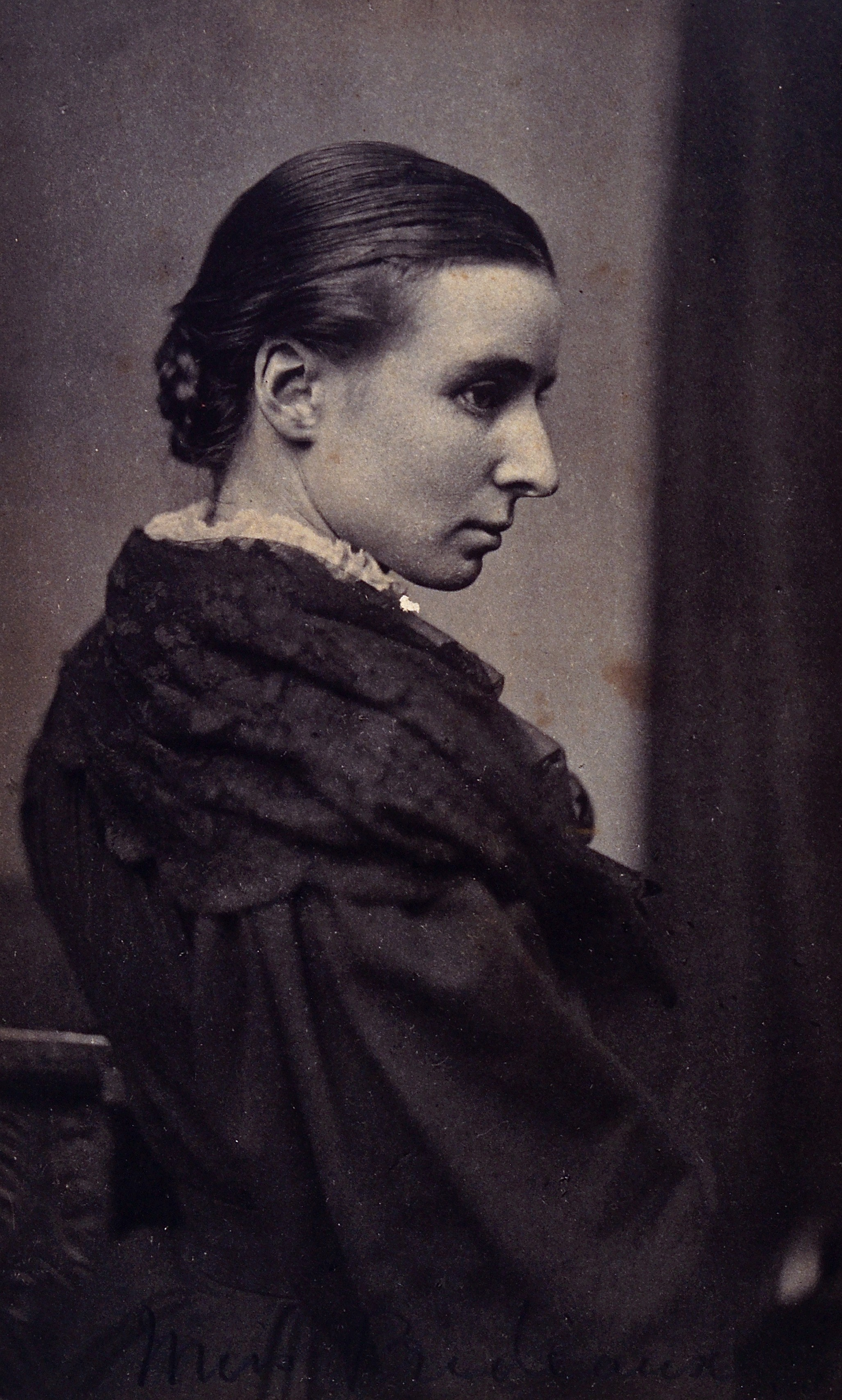
- Portrait photograph of Frances Helen Prideaux taken by Frederick Hollyer and in the collection of Edward Albert Sharpey-Schafer
- Born: 1858
- Died: 1885 (aged 26–27)
- Education: London School of Medicine for Women
- Occupation: Physician
- Employers: Bethlem Hospital; Elizabeth Garrett Anderson Hospital; Paddington Green Children's Hospital

Frances Helen Prideaux MB BS (1858 – 29 November 1885) was a physician and "one of the most distinguished students" of the London School of Medicine for Women. Her academic and professional success caused changes in the stance of influential people who had been opposed to women in medicine.

== Early life ==
Prideaux was educated at Queen's College, London, as well as receiving private tuition.

== Career ==
In 1877, Prideaux was signatory to a letter addressed to the Chancellor and Senate of the University of London expressing thanks for steps taken and urging more to be done to grant medical degrees to women. One year later, she passed the General Examination for Women (equivalent to matriculation) from the university.

Prideaux obtained both BS and MB degrees with honours from the London School of Medicine for Women in 1884. She won the gold medal and an exhibition from the University of London for being first in the class in anatomy.

Prideaux worked as a demonstrator of physiology and anatomy at the London School of Medicine for Women. She worked at Bethlem Hospital and the Elizabeth Garrett Anderson Hospital.

In 1885, Prideaux applied for a job as house surgeon at the Paddington Green Children's Hospital. Applications were open to women and men candidates. When Prideaux was selected for the job in November 1885, she became the first woman to be appointed to a London hospital who had been chosen over male applicants.

== Death and legacy ==
Four weeks after her appointment, Prideaux died from diphtheria, likely contracted from one of her patients. Before her death, she had been given a tracheotomy and then a laryngotomy and had helped with her own treatment. She had refused to let loved ones be at her side during her treatment and death to protect them from also becoming ill.

Prideaux's death was publicly mourned. Her death was reported in the British Medical Journal, which linked her death with that of Robert Lawson, house surgeon at St Thomas, as an example of the dangers inherent in the profession.

A memorial fund was created in Prideaux's name, administered by Henrietta Stanley, Baroness Stanley of Alderley and Elizabeth Garrett Anderson. Sir William Gull was an early and notable contributor to the fund. Gull had been against the idea of women becoming doctors, but described Prideaux's achievements as "vindicat[ing] the right of women to take the highest position in a difficult and intellectual profession."

Sophia Jex-Blake wrote of Prideaux's achievements alongside those of Mary Scharlieb, who gained a gold medal in obstetrics in 1882, and quoted Gull's speech at the memorial scholarship meeting.

In 2004, an oil painting of Prideaux from 1886 was recorded as being held at the Royal Free Hospital.
