= Mary Blair (disambiguation) =

Mary Blair (1911–1978) was an American artist, animator, and designer.

Mary Blair may also refer to:

- Mary Alice Blair (1880–1962), New Zealand doctor
- Mary Blair Moody (1837–1919), American physician, anatomist, and editor
- Mary Caroline Blair (1848–1912), British duchess
