= Gladys Maud Sandes =

Irish surgeon and venereologist

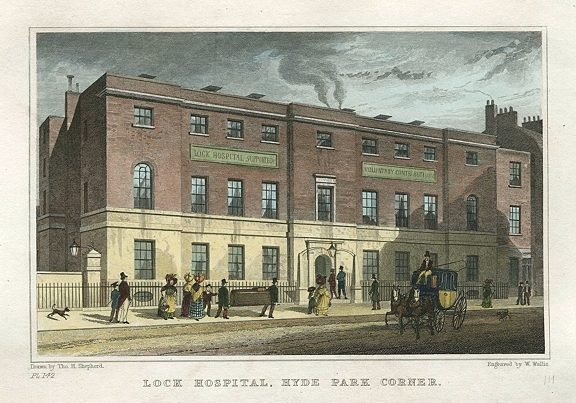
The London Lock Hospital, shown shortly after its establishment in 1747, was the first voluntary venereal disease clinic in Britain. Gladys Sandes became the first female surgeon at the hospital in 1925.

Gladys Maud Sandes Alston FRCS (5 November 1897 – 17 January 1968) was an Irish surgeon and venereologist and the first woman surgeon at the London Lock Hospital in 1925. Inspired by Elizabeth Garrett Anderson, she became an active member of the medical community and published widely on venereal diseases like syphilis and the treatment of children after sexual assault.

== Life ==
Sandes was born in Dublin on 5 November 1897. Her family later relocated to London, where attended Wimbledon High School. She later married James Maxwell Alston FRCP (b.1900) and had a daughter.

== Studies ==
She completed her medical studies at the London School of Medicine for Women (LSMW) in 1922, in that same year becoming a Licentiate of the Royal College of Physicians and a Member of the Royal College of Surgeons. The LSMW had been since its foundation in 1874 the main institution for the education of women doctors and surgeons in England. She later returned to the LSMW to lecture in anatomy. She was elected a Fellow of the Royal College of Surgeons in 1930.

== Work ==
After qualifying at the LSMW in 1922, she held residencies at the London Lock Hospital and the Mildmay Mission Hospital. She later became surgical registrar at the South London Hospital for Women. In 1925, she became the first woman surgical registrar at the London Lock Hospital. As her career progressed, she was elected to consultant posts at Queen Mary's Hospital in Carshalton, the Mother's Hospital in London, and the London Lock Hospital. According to her obituary, she 'greatly prized' her position at the Lock Hospital - although the institution was closed after changes brought in by the foundation of the National Health Service.

She also kept up a private practice at 41 Devonshire Square, London, W1.

Sandes was very active in medical organisations and societies, including the Royal Society of Medicine and the British Medical Association. From 1955 to 1957 she was chairman of the Marylebone Branch of the BMA. She also served as chairman of the editorial board of the publication Mother and child.

== Research and specialty ==
Sandes worked in venereology, urology and gynecology. In 1929, she published a textbook on the nervous system based on her work as Demonstrator of Anatomy at the London School of Medicine for Women. She was profoundly affected by her early professional experiences at the London Lock Hospital and the Royal Free Hospital. She dedicated her life to the treatment of venereal diseases, particularly in women and children. She had hoped to found a postgraduate institute for venereology at the London Lock Hospital, although this plan was disrupted by its closure. Prevailing belief at the time was the all venereal disease would be eradicated by antibiotics, and the hospital was provisioned by the new NHS for other purposes. With the closure, Sandes relocated her work to the Salvation Army Mother's Hospital, where she continued until her retirement in 1962. She also made great contributions to the medical treatment of children who had suffered sexual assault.

Many women doctors of the early twentieth century focused on venereal diseases - an area of work which was less competitive than some other male dominated specialties. It was also believed that women doctors and surgeons were particularly well placed to treat female patients with often stigmatised sexually transmitted diseases.

== Personal interests ==
Sandes is remembered as an enthusiastic traveller - visiting the United States, Russia, South African and many European countries.

== Legacy ==
In 2018, Sandes and her work at the London Lock Hospital was featured in the exhibition 'This vexed question': 500 years of women in medicine at the Royal College of Physicians.
