= Maud Chadburn =

British surgeon

Maud Mary Chadburn
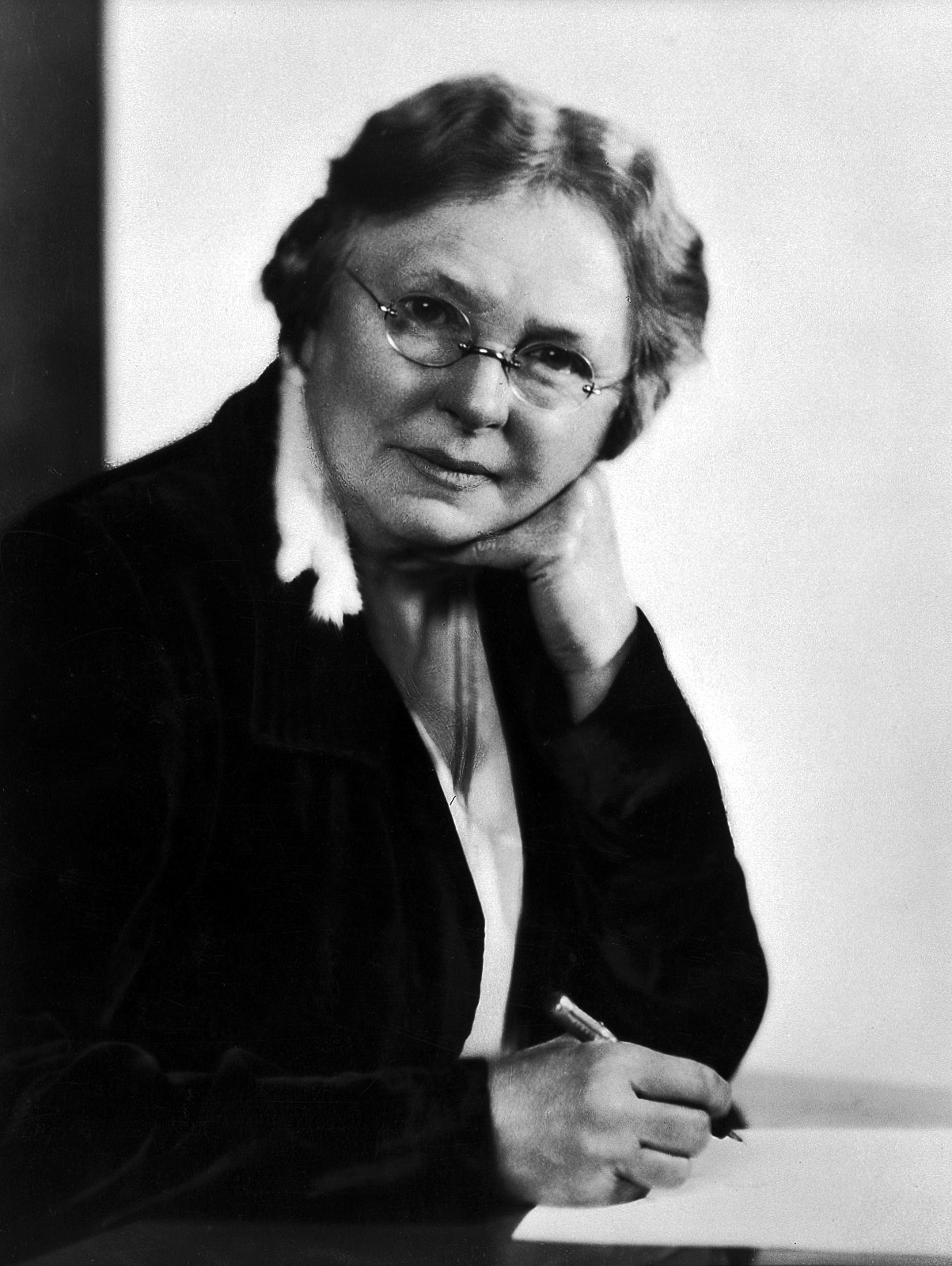
- Born: 9 March 1868; Middlesbrough, Yorkshire, England
- Died: 24 April 1957 (aged 89)
- Education: Milton Mount College; University College, London; London School of Medicine for Women
- Known for: Co-founder of South London Hospital for Women and Children
- Relatives: Rev James Chadburn (Father); Grace Chadburn(née Tetley)(Mother)
- Medical career
- Profession: Surgeon
- Institutions: Elizabeth Garrett Anderson Hospital; Women's Settlement Hospital; Marie Curie Hospital; London Association of the Medical Women's Federation; South London Hospital for Women and Children

Maud Mary Chadburn CBE (9 March 1868 – 24 April 1957), was one of the earliest women in the United Kingdom to pursue a career as a surgeon. She also co-founded the South London Hospital for Women and Children in 1912 with fellow surgeon Eleanor Davies-Colley.

== Early life ==
Maud Chadburn was born in Middlesbrough; her father was Reverend James Chadburn, a Congregational minister from Blackburn and her mother was Grace (née Tetley) from Bradford. By 1881 the family had moved to Kent, as shown on the 1881 census. Maud had two sisters and one brother, all younger than herself. Her sister Grace (known as Mrs Archibald Christie) was an embroiderer and her brother George an artist.

== Education ==
Chadburn was educated at Milton Mount College, an educational institution for the daughters of Congregational ministers, although other pupils were also accepted. She later studied at University College, London and at the London School of Medicine for Women.

== Qualifications ==
Chadburn qualified as a Licentiate of the Society of Apothecaries (1893), Bachelor of Medicine London (1894), Doctor of Medicine (1898), and B.S. (1899).

Printed in The Times newspaper on 23 November 1894 was the pass list for the University of London:

MB examination, Second Division: Maud Mary Chadburn, London School of Medicine and Royal Free Hospital.

In The Times newspaper, 19 December 1899, LONDON 18 December pass list:

BS examination, Second Division: Maud Mary Chadburn, MD, London School of Medicine and Royal Free Hospital.

== Career ==
Maud Chadburn held posts of assistant anaesthetist, curator of the museum and surgical registrar at the Royal Free Hospital. Earlier appointments held were House Surgeon and clinical assistant at the Elizabeth Garrett Anderson Hospital where later she became the surgeon from 1903 until 1922; she also worked for many years as senior obstetrician. Also, she was formerly surgeon to the Elizabeth Garrett Anderson Hospital and to the Women's Settlement Hospital, Canning Town, chairman of the Cancer Research Committee of the Marie Curie Hospital and president of the London Association of the Medical Women's Federation.

== South London Hospital for Women and Children ==
In 1912 Chadburn co-founded the South London Hospital for Women and Children, a general hospital treating women and children on Clapham Common in London, UK. The hospital, also known as the South London Hospital for Women and the South London Women's Hospital, always employed an all-woman staff.

"The careers of those second generation medical women who achieved prominent reputations as surgeons, such as Louisa Garrett Anderson, Dame Louisa Aldrich-Blake, Lady Barrett, Elizabeth Bolton, Maud Chadburn, Elizabeth Davies-Colley, Gertrude Herzfeld (all qualifying between 1894 and 1914) exhibit a pattern of successive appointments within the interlocking network of women-run hospitals and the RFH. To take just one example, Maud Chadburn qualified MB in 1894 from the LSMW, and held houseposts at the RFH, Clapham Maternity, and the NHW. After a spell as surgical registrar at the RFH, she was appointed to the honorary staff of the NHW in 1903 as senior surgeon and obstetrician, and also surgeon to the Canning Town Women’s Settlement Hospital, before she began the drive to establish the SLH."

== Personal life ==
After the official 'Times' obituary for Chadburn, her adopted daughter wrote "a more personal note of appreciation" to the original obituary. In it she mentioned that "though she never married she adopted three children; and in all she did for them she never forgot her own deeply unhappy childhood. All her medical studies were undertaken on her own initiative..."

== Miscellaneous ==
Very close to where the South London Hospital for Women and Children used to be in Clapham there is a road named after Maud called 'Maud Chadburn Place.' When the hospital closed in 1984 the building was converted into a Tesco supermarket and flats.
