= Helen Hanson =

British physician, missionary and suffragist

- Born: 6 January 1874; Dorking
- Died: 6 July 1926 (aged 52); St John
- Other names: Helen Rice
- Occupation: Doctor
- Known for: Suffragette, doctor, missionary

Helen Beatrice de Rastricke Hanson (6 January 1874 – 6 July 1926) was a British physician, missionary and suffragist.

== Life ==
Hanson was born in Dorking, Surrey, on 6 January 1874 to Caroline Anne (born Offord) and Edward Hanson and his wife, Caroline Ann. Her parents were members of the Plymouth Brethren. Her father, who managed a local bank, had been brought up in Chile. She was with her family as they moved to Richmond and then to Bognor Regis until at fourteen she was sent to a boarding school run by her cousins. She was a voracious student and she decided to take up the challenge of a career in medicine. She had a Bedford College scholarship but decided to study at the London School of Medicine for Women.

Hanson qualified in 1904 and went to work at the St Pancras Infirmary. She took at a certificate in tropical medicine in 1905. She worked at the Hospital for Women and Children at Bristol, and the Morpeth and Menston county asylums before deciding to leave the country. She had decided to take her skills to India like her role model Mary Scharlieb (who had taught her obstetrics and gynaecology). Unusually she opted to be a missionary for the Zenana Bible and Medical Missionary Society. A Zenana is an area of a house or building set aside for women.

She left from Exeter Hall in 1905 and set out for Lucknow to work at the Kinnaird Memorial Hospital which was named for Mary Jane Kinnaird. Hanson was given a level of responsibility and she was hospital's director when the usual person went on holiday. She had learnt Urdu and she worked hospitals at Benares and Jaunpur and St. Luke's Zenana Hospital at Palampur. However she left India in 1909 and chose to travel in steerage class so that she could donate the five pounds saved to the suffragette cause. She remained interested in missionary work but did not feel well enough to return.

However India had affected her spiritually she said that her experience in India of different religions and "Hinduism especially—has… left me with a far greater conception of God", stemming from the affinities she found between the incarnational theology of Charles Gore and Hinduism. She became a member of the Church of England on her return. She had been brought up in a family who was politically active and in support of women having the vote. Unlike her parents she believed in militancy. She joined Emmeline Pankhurst's Women's Social and Political Union and she was one of those arrested on Black Friday. Two hundred suffragettes had been arrested as they tried to enter the Houses of Parliament. The event attracted wide attention. The deputation was led by Emmeline Pankhurst to petition Asquith. The delegates included Dorinda Neligan, Hertha Ayrton, Dr Elizabeth Garrett Anderson, Dr Louisa Garrett Anderson, Anne Cobden-Sanderson, and Princess Sophia Duleep Singh. Under the name, Helen Rice, she served five days in prison.

Her main efforts were directed towards the Church League for Women's Suffrage (later League of the Church Militant ) where she had been a founding member of this Anglican group in 1909. She had also been a member of the University of London Suffrage Society, the Women's Freedom League, the Industrial Christian Fellowship, the Association for Moral and Social Hygiene and the League of Nations Union. Under the auspices of the Church league she had published her own ideas of how suffragists and missionaries should combine their forces. During the first war she served with the Red Cross before she was transferred to the Scottish Women's Hospital Unit. She was one of the few women to serve with the Royal Army Medical Corps and she was given the rank of captain. She served in France, Turkey, Malta and Serbia and was given medals to record her services. The medals were the 1914 Star with clasp, the British War and Victory Medals, the Order of St. Sava, 2nd type from Serbia, 4th Class breast badge and a Red Cross Decoration.

After the war she joined an expeditionary force at the Black Sea. She served with that group until 1920 when she returned to her pre-war job. She was one of London county council' assistant school medical officers. She continued to submit contributions to suffrage publications and the British Medical Journal.

== Death and legacy ==
She was run down by a motor vehicle and later died of her injuries on 6 July 1926. Her medals were sold at auction in 2012.
