= Edith Shove =

English medical doctor (1848–1929)

Edith Shove (1848 – 16 November 1929), M.B. Lond., was one of the earliest English women medical doctors, and among the first to complete her training at the London School of Medicine for Women. She was the first British woman doctor to hold a public appointment with her work at the Post Office.

== Training ==
She started to train in medicine in the early 1870s, being placed first in the Apothecaries' Hall preliminary examinations in 1874. Unusually for the era, she trained as an apprentice with a male surgeon-apothecary named Dr Prior Purvis. She became one of the first female students to join the newly founded London School of Medicine for Women. In 1877 the Senate of the University of London voted that she should be permitted to take the university medical examinations, but the permission was retracted in response to protests by over 200 male medical graduates. In 1879 she was one of the first four women to sit the exams of the newly accepted London School of Medicine for Women at the Royal Free Hospital, passing, as the others did, in the first division

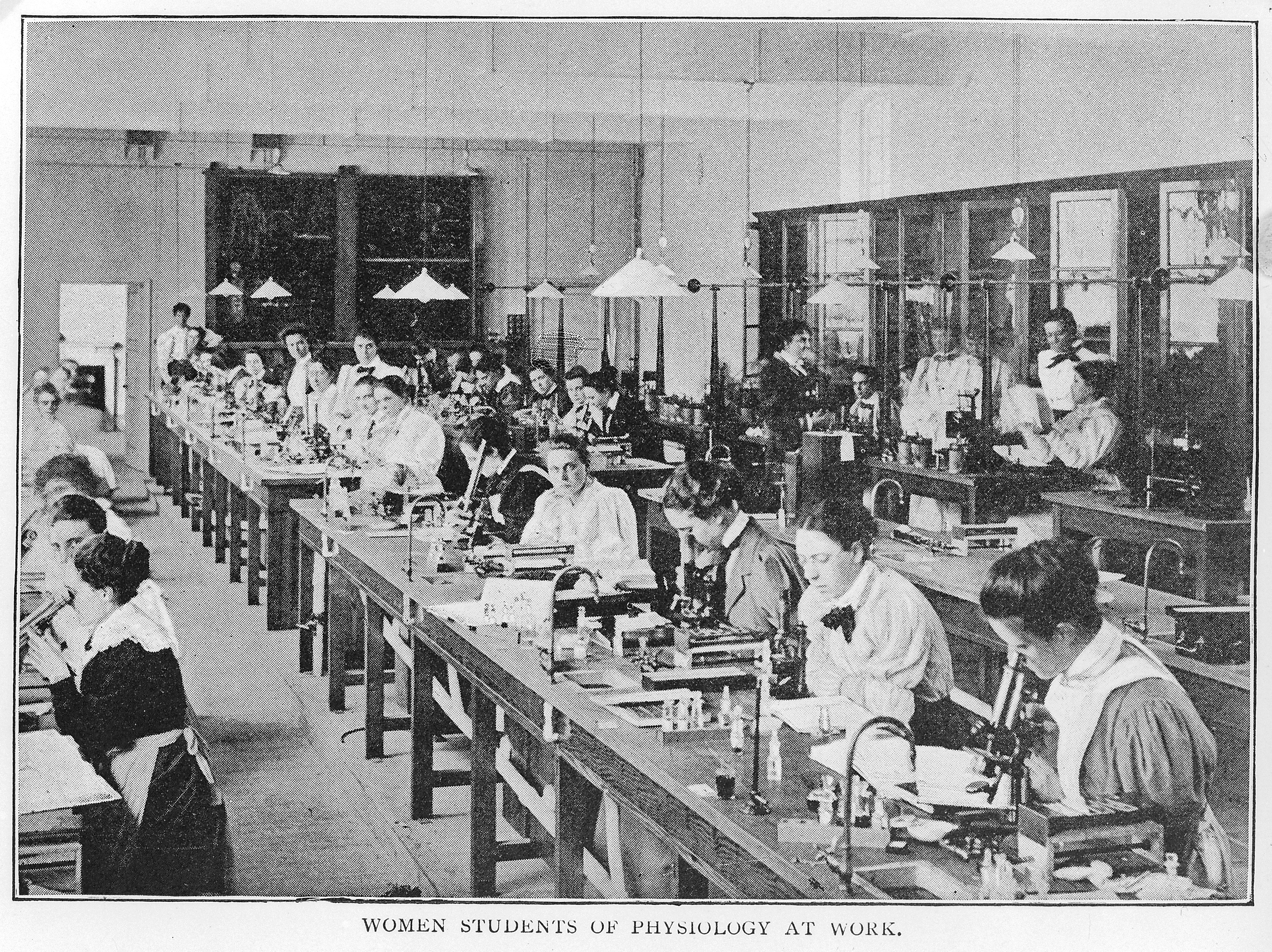
The London School of Medicine, Physiology Laboratory.

== Career ==
Having passed her preliminary examination at the Worshipful Society of Apothecaries, Shove was one of the first women to be licensed by a medical College. She was granted her licentiate from the Irish College of Physicians in 1876. This change in regulation was made possible by the implementation of the Medical (Enabling) Act supported by Russell Gurney in the same year. in Prior to her graduation with the degree of MB in 1882 she was demonstrator in anatomy at the London School of Medicine for Women. She carried out joint research on the diabetic pancreas with the French physician Charles Remy, published in 1882. In 1883 she became medical officer to the female staff of the Post Office, having been appointed by the Postmaster General, Henry Fawcett, as supporter of the women's movement. This position was the first time a woman doctor had held a public appointment. She held this role looking after the health of female post office employees until at least 1905. She died on 16 November 1929, aged 82 years.
