= Helen Mackay =

British paediatrician

- Born: 23 May 1891; Inverness, Scotland
- Died: 15 July 1965 (aged 74)
- Burial place: Golders Green Crematorium, London
- Education: London School of Medicine for Women
- Known for: First woman fellow of the Royal College of Physicians

Helen Marion Macpherson Mackay (23 May 1891 – 15 July 1965) was a British paediatrician. She made important contributions to the understanding of childhood nutrition and preventive healthcare. Mackay was the first woman fellow of the Royal College of Physicians.

After graduation from the London School of Medicine for Women (now part of the UCL Medical School), Mackay practiced at the Queen Elizabeth Hospital for Children where she was the first female physician to work there, and also one of the first women to be appointed as a consultant there. Helen Mackay was the first person to investigate anaemia in infants and to attribute iron deficiency as an important factor of this. This led to changes in childhood nutrition favouring breastfeeding over formula feeding in the United Kingdom.

== Early life and education ==
Born in Inverness, Scotland, on 23 May 1891 to Duncan Lachlan Macpherson Mackay and Marion Gordon Campbell (née Wimberley), Mackay spent some of her childhood in Burma, where she was homeschooled. Her father worked in Indian Civil Service there. Her early education was at the private school Cheltenham Ladies' College in England. She attended the London Royal Free Hospital School of Medicine for Women (now part of the UCL Medical School), obtaining her MBBS degree in 1914 and then earning an MD in 1917. While there she edited the London School of Medicine for Women Magazine, a magazine for the women physicians there.

== Medical and research career ==
Mackay specialised in paediatrics. She was the first female physician at the Queen Elizabeth Hospital for Children and was later one of first women to be appointed as consultant there. In 1919, Mackay moved to Vienna where she studied rickets and other nutritional diseases at the Lister Institute of Preventative Medicine as part of the Beit Research Fellowship. She remained in Vienna until 1922 when she continued her research in the United Kingdom. Mackay was a part of a British team led by Harriette Chick whose studies displayed the importance of cod liver oil and sunlight in preventing and potentially curing rickets.

While working on finding the cause of rickets, Mackay noticed all of the infants in her studies were anaemic, and thus she became interested in finding the cause of this. Mackay returned to London and conducted the first investigation on anaemia in infants with the help of medical statistician Major Greenwood. Mackay discovered that iron deficiency had an important role in causing childhood anaemia. She further discovered that breastfed infants had a lower chance of becoming anaemic than those fed with artificial milk. Her research also provided compelling evidence that showed infants who were given iron developed fewer infections, gained more weight, and were overall healthier. The findings of her studies were summarised in 'Nutritional Anaemia in Infancy' and published in 1931. She was the first person to try to define anaemia by defining the lower limit of normal haemoglobin concentration. The World Health Organization's definition of anaemia closely resembles Mackay's definition. Mackay was awarded the Dawson Memorial Prize in Paediatrics and won the British Medical Association Ernest Hart Memorial Research Scholar fellowship for her preventative medicine research.

She became the first woman fellow of the Royal College of Physicians in recognition of her research into nutritional anaemia in 1934. Mackay continued to work on research focusing on breastfeeding, formula feeding, and dietary deficiency diseases.

== Later life and death ==
Helen Mackay was concerned about the impact of social conditions on child health and development. In order to combat this she helped set up clinics in Hackney, where Mackay was able to help mothers and infants in her community.

In 1945, Helen Mackay was elected to the British Paediatric Association, one of the first women members. She continued to work as a consultant paediatrician for the Mother's Hospital, Clapton, and Hackney Hospital until 1959. On 17 July 1965 Mackay died of a stroke; she was buried three days later at the Golders Green Crematorium in London.

== Honors and awards ==
- Beit Research Fellowship (1919–1922)
- Ernest Hart Memorial Research Scholar, British Medical Association
- Dawson Memorial Prize (Paediatrics)
- Fellow, Royal College of Physicians (1934)
- Chair, Advisory Committee of Paediatricians
- President, Section of Disease in Children, Royal Society of Medicine
