= Ruth Bowden =

English anatomist

Ruth Bowden OBE FRCS MRCS
- Born: Ruth Elizabeth Mary Bowden; 21 February 1915; India
- Died: 19 December 2001 (aged 86)
- Education: London School of Medicine for Women
- Occupation: Professor
- Medical career
- Field: Anatomist
- Institutions: Royal Free Hospital School of Medicine
- Sub-specialties: Peripheral nerve injuries and leprosy
- Research: Anatomy
- Notable works: The evolution and growth of the Anatomical Society of Great Britain and Ireland, 1887-1987
- Awards: Rockefeller Fellowship 1949; Hunterian Professorship 1950; Queen Elizabeth II Silver Jubilee Medal

Ruth Elizabeth Mary Bowden OBE (21 February 1915 – 19 December 2001) was an English anatomist. A professor of anatomy of the Royal Free Hospital School of Medicine for thirty years, she was best known for her work on peripheral nerve injuries and leprosy.

== Biography ==
Bowden was born in 1915 to Frank Harold and Louise Ellen Bowden. She was born in India, where her father worked as a Baptist missionary, but she moved to England at the age of eight to live with her extended family. She was educated at Westlands School and St Paul's Girls' School before completing an MBBS at the London School of Medicine for Women in 1940.

Bowden held house posts at the Elizabeth Garrett Anderson Hospital before moving to Oxford in 1942 to join Herbert Seddon's peripheral nerve injury unit. She returned to London in 1945 to become an assistant lecturer in anatomy at the Royal Free Hospital School of Medicine; she was promoted in 1951 to professor of anatomy, a position she held for thirty years. In 1949, she was awarded a Rockefeller Fellowship that allowed her to travel to the polio laboratory at Johns Hopkins University, and in 1950 she was awarded a Hunterian Professorship. Throughout her research career, her most significant contributions were to striated muscle tissue disease and healing of peripheral nerve injuries in leprosy. She visited India multiple times throughout her life to train local surgeons to repair nerve injuries caused by leprosy.

Bowden received numerous honours, including an OBE in the 1980 Birthday Honours, Fellowship of the Royal College of Surgeons (RCS), and a Queen Elizabeth II Silver Jubilee Medal. In 1985, she was appointed Sir William Collins Professor at the RCS, a role in which she reformed anatomy teaching for surgeons. She was a WHO consultant to the University of Khartoum throughout the 1970s and president of the Medical Women's Federation in 1981–82. She died in 2001 from injuries she sustained in a road accident.
