= Winifred Buckley =

Indian woman-surgeon from the First World War

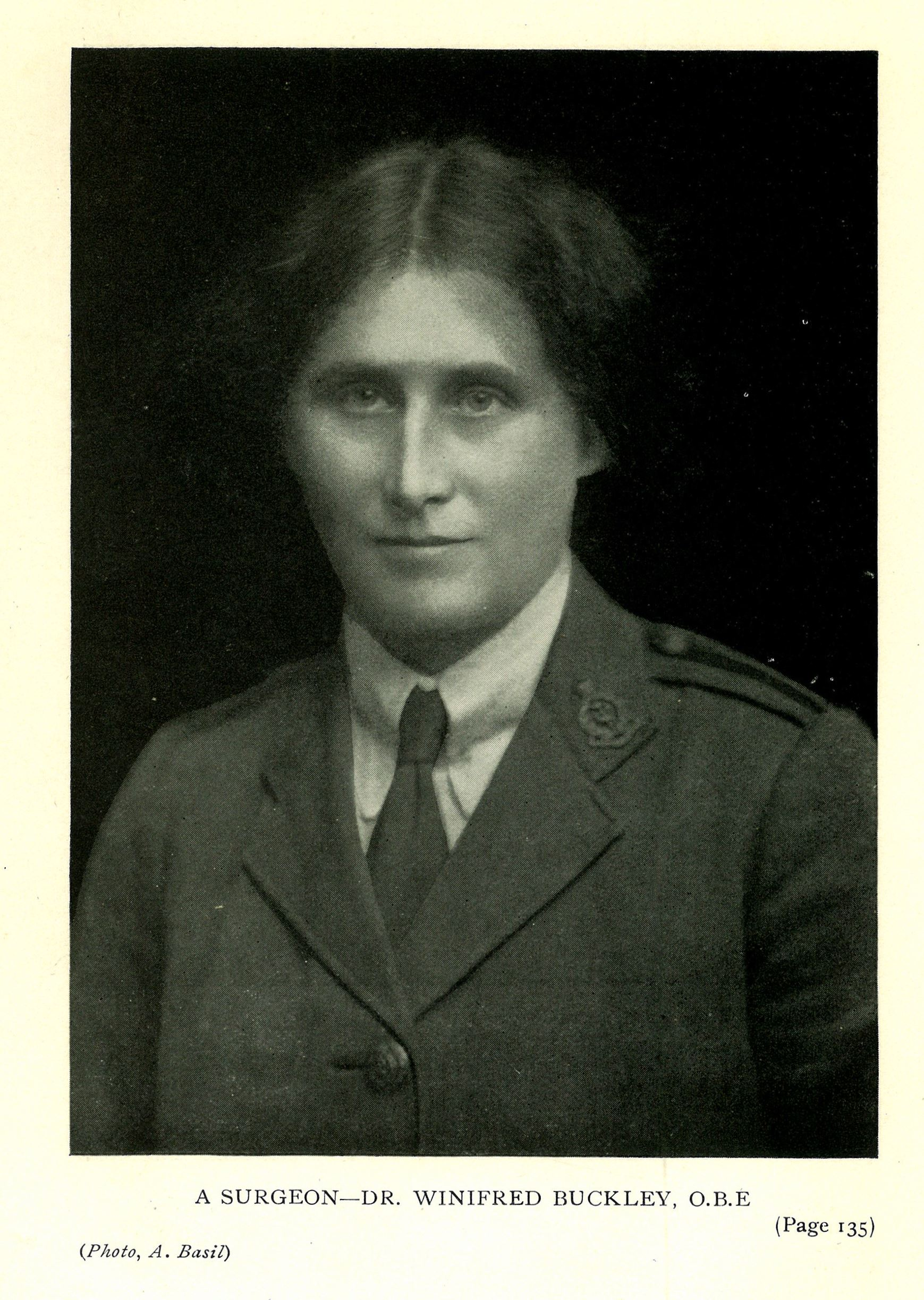
- Winifred Buckley
- Born: 18 October 1883; Calcutta, India
- Died: 10 April 1959 (aged 75)
- Known for: assistant surgeon at the Endell Street Military Hospital
- Scientific career
- Fields: surgery, military medicine

Winifred Finnimore Buckley (18 October 1883 - 10 April 1959) was one of the woman-surgeons working at the famous Endell Street Military Hospital in London during the First World War.

== Life ==
She was born in Calcutta, India, to Ada Marion Sarah Finnimore and Robert Burton Buckley (1847–1927), a civil engineer then working in Bengal.

After graduating at the London School of Medicine for Women, Buckley worked for a year in a junior post at Harrow Road children's hospital and for six months as a house surgeon in Kingston upon Hull. When she joined the Endell Street hospital in 1914, she was one of the youngest doctors there. She came to regard that time as "perhaps the happiest time in her life".

In January 1920, the King appointed her as Officer of the Civil Division of the Order of the British Empire (OBE) for her “valuable services” rendered in Military Hospitals during the War.

On the same year, she was registered as a licentiate of the Royal College of Physicians, London (LRCP) and as a member of the Royal College of Surgeons (MRCS).

An Operation at the Military Hospital, Endell Street : Dr Louisa Garrett Anderson, Dr Flora Murray, Dr Winifred Buckley (1920) by Francis Dodd

Buckley is portrayed, along with the two leading figures of the Endell Street hospital Louisa Garrett Anderson and Flora Murray, in the oil-on-canvas painting by Francis Dodd An Operation at the Military Hospital, Endell Street (1920), now preserved in the collections of the Imperial War Museum.

== Bibliography ==
- Wendy Moore, Endell Street. The trailblazing women who ran World War One's most remrkable military hospital, Atlantic Books, London 2020, pp. 376
