= Paddington Green Children's Hospital =

- Paddington and North Kensington Health Authority
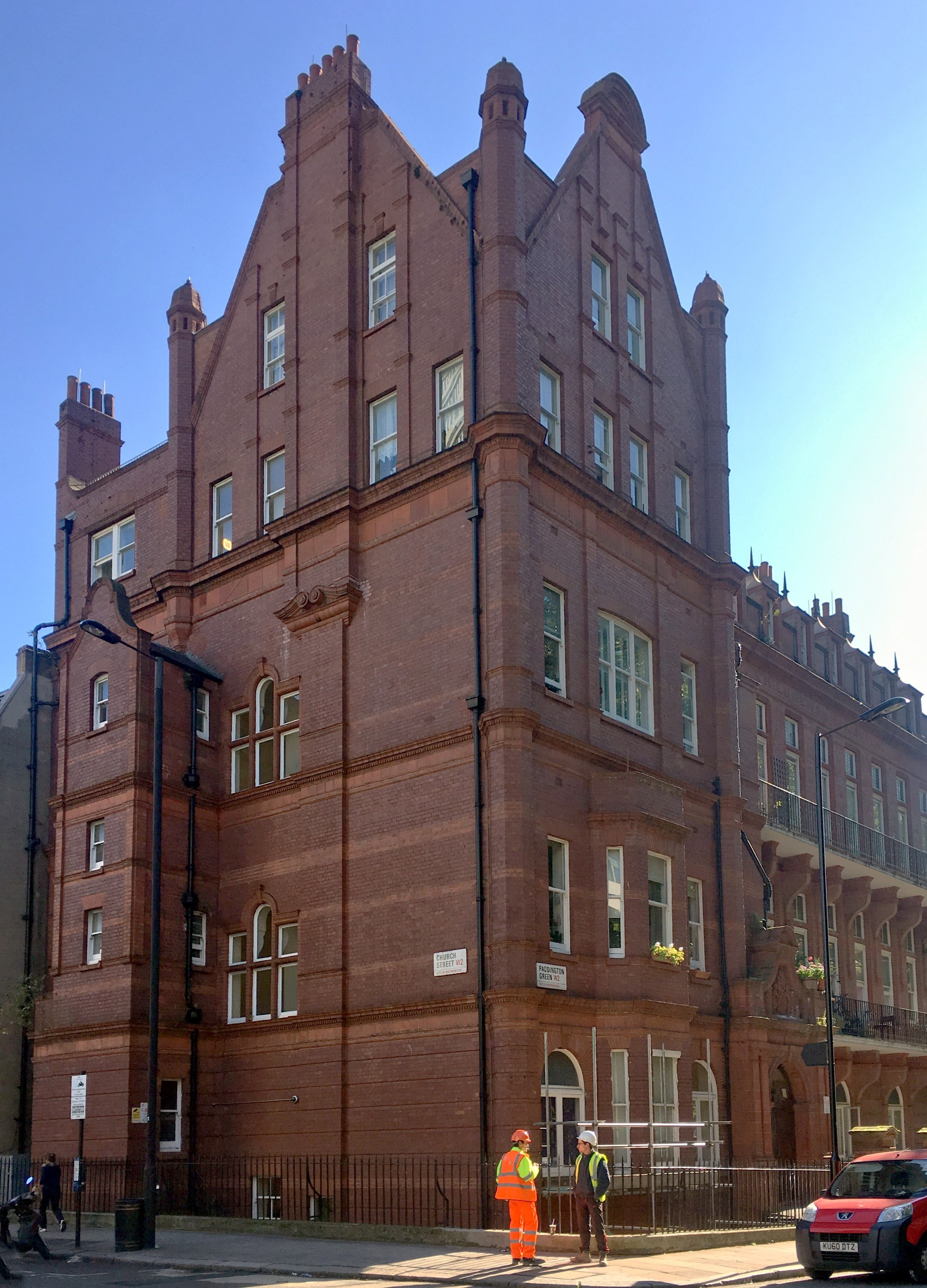
- Paddington Green Children's Hospital

- Location within Westminster

Geography
- Location: City of Westminster, London, England, United Kingdom
- Coordinates: 51.5209°N 0.1736°W

Organisation
- Care system: NHS England

History
- Founded: 1883
- Closed: 1987

Listed Building – Grade II
- Official name: Children's Hospital, Paddington Green
- Designated: 15 July 1987
- Reference no.: 1357437

Links
- Lists: Hospitals in England

The Paddington Green Children's Hospital was a hospital in Paddington Green, London, that existed from 1883 to 1987. The former building is now grade II listed with Historic England.

== History ==
The hospital was founded at Bell Street by Eustace Smith and T.C. Kirby as the North West London Free Dispensary for Sick Children in 1862. It moved to Paddington Green in 1883 and was completely rebuilt and then reopened by the Duchess of Teck in 1895. Several wards were decorated with picture tiles: tiles in the Princess Louise Ward (later used as office space) depicted nursery rhymes, the Mary Adelaide Ward with biblical scenes made by Doulton and the Small Ward with Aesop’s fables. A new out-patients department opened in 1911; tiles depicting children’s games, nursery rhymes and country scenes decorated the department.

In November 1885, the hospital became the first London hospital to appoint a woman to a medical job in an open competition with men when Frances Helen Prideaux became house surgeon. Prideaux contracted diphtheria soon after her appointment and helped her colleagues in their attempts to treat her but died one month after she had started her role.

In 1923, Donald Winnicott obtained a paediatric post at the hospital and was to remain there for the next 40 years. He became a celebrated psychoanalyst and child analyst, member of the Object relations school, writer and broadcaster on the BBC.

Margaret Leigh (pen name Jane Gordon) worked as a nurse in the hospital in the 1930s and 1940s and her memoir Married to Charles (1950) contains much information about the operation of the hospital in that time, especially during The Blitz.

The hospital joined the National Health Service under the same management as St Mary's Hospital in 1948. After services were transferred to St Mary's Hospital, it closed in 1987.

== Notable staff ==
Notable staff have included:

- John Davis
- Leonard Guthrie
- Francis Dudley Hart
- Frederick Charles Hurrell
- Walter Jessop
- Audrey Lees
- Frances Helen Prideaux
- Edith MacGregor Rome
- George Alexander Sutherland
- Peter Tizard
- Donald Winnicott
