= Mary Scharlieb =

British physician and gynaecologist

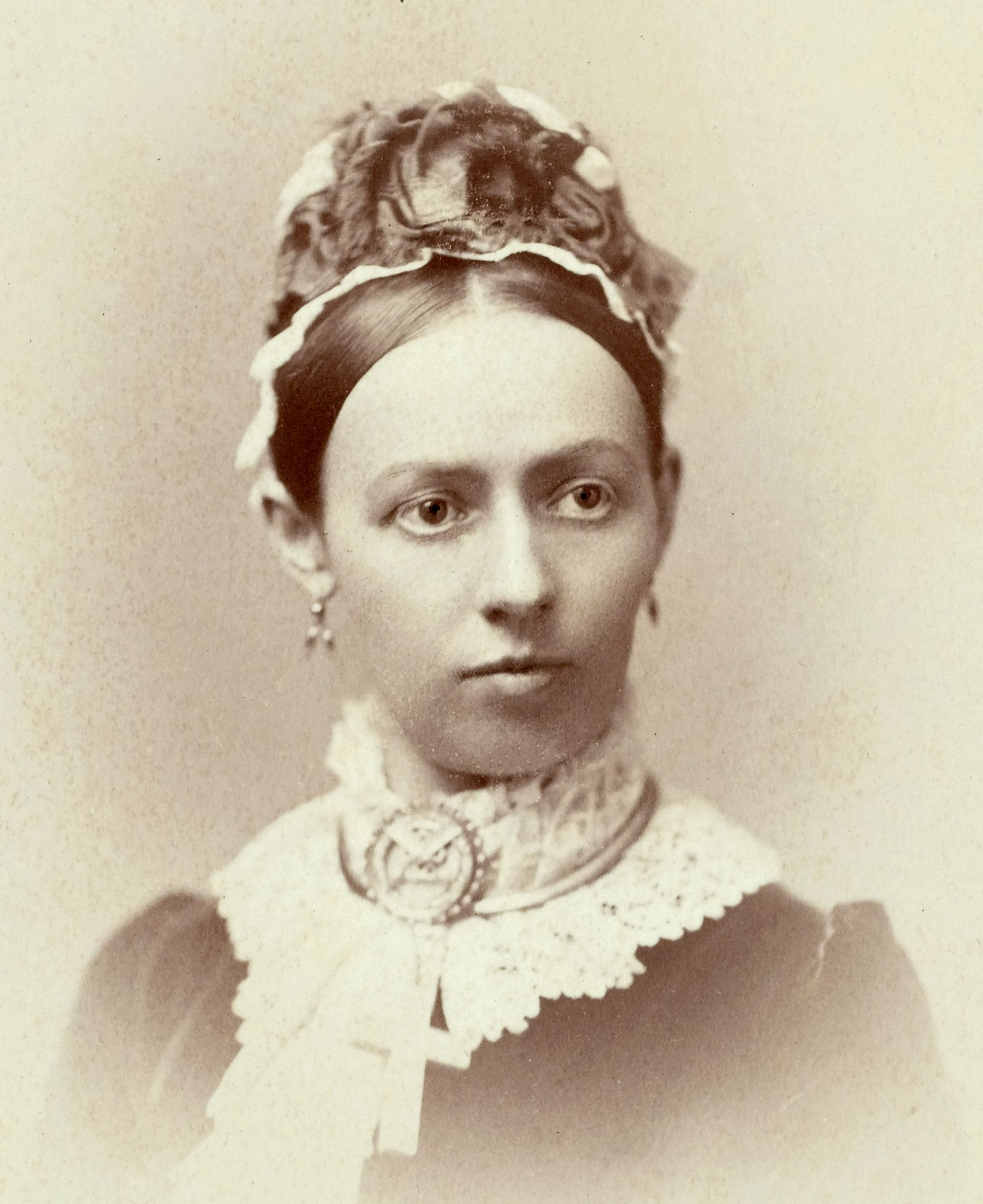
- Mary Scharlieb c. 1875
- Born: Mary Ann Dacomb Bird; 18 June 1845, 1844
- Died: 21 November 1930 (aged 85); London, England, UK
- Education: Madras Medical College
- Occupation: Gynaecologist

Dame Mary Ann Dacomb Scharlieb, DBE (née Bird; 18 June 1845 – 21 November 1930) was a pioneer British female physician and gynaecologist in the late 19th/early 20th centuries. She had worked in India. She was the first female student of medicine at Madras Medical College. After her graduation and work in India, she went to England to do her Postgraduation in Medicine (gynecology) and by her persistence she returned to the UK to become a qualified doctor. She returned to Madras and eventually lectured in London. She was the first woman to be elected to the honorary visiting staff of a hospital in the UK and one of the most distinguished women in medicine of her generation.

== Biography ==
Mary Dacomb Bird was born the daughter of William Chandler Bird and his wife Mary Dacomb; her mother died 10 days after she was born. Raised by her grandparents in a strict Evangelical Christian household, she attended a boarding school in Manchester, then to one in New Brighton, and finally at Mrs Tyndall's School at 16 Upper Hamilton Terrace in London. Hers was a conventional middle-class upbringing. Aged 19, she met William Scharlieb, "who was engaged in eating his dinners at the Middle Temple, preparatory to his call to the Bar and subsequent practice in Madras as a barrister". His initial marriage proposal in February 1865 was met with prompt parental opposition. Mary persisted and eventually the marriage took place in December 1865, and the couple sailed for India almost at once.

While in Madras, Scharlieb learned about the lack of medical services for women's gynaecological health and during childbirth, making the birth process dangerous. This situation motivated her to gain medical experience, and she was allowed to train as a pupil midwife. She then wanted to attend medical school. However, her husband did not want her to leave their young family to study in England, where women were starting to gain entrance into medical schools. In 1875, she entered medical school one of the first four women students at the Madras Medical College. In three years she gained her Licentiate in Medicine, surgery, and midwifery.

She set sail to return to England with her children, old enough by then to travel, in a small ship, her eyes fixed on a degree in medicine. Part of her motivation in returning to England was to organize a female-staffed medical service to India. English institutions were more amenable to training women in medicine who would serve elsewhere, and it would also benefit the women in India.

Upon her return to England in 1878, she called on Dr (Mrs) Elizabeth Garrett Anderson, the only qualified medical woman until 1877, who had recently started the London School of Medicine for Women. Here she met with small encouragement, her prolonged stay in India and her naturally frail physique producing an unfavourable impression of her ability to follow such a strenuous profession. She was, however, accepted, and in 1879, in company with three other candidates for the first medical examination, she passed.

In November 1882, aged 37, she received a degree of Bachelor of Medicine and Surgery with Honours in all subjects, the Gold Medal and the Scholarship in Obstetrics; shortly after this she gained second-class Honours in Surgery. As did many men at that time, she went for six weeks to study operative midwifery in Vienna, and by her persistence she obtained practice and experience.

She met with Queen Victoria who was curious about the status of Indian women and intrigued by Scharlieb's narrative. In 1883, she returned to India, and became lecturer in midwifery and gynæcology at the Madras Medical College and examiner in the same subjects to the university of Madras. Five years later, she returned to Britain to study for a higher degree in medicine, receiving her M.D. from the University of London in 1888. From 1887 to 1902 was surgeon at the New Hospital for Women (now the Elizabeth Garrett Anderson Hospital, Euston Road) initially assisting Dr Elizabeth Garrett Anderson, and being senior surgeon from 1889.

In 1887, she was appointed lecturer on forensic medicine to the Royal Free Hospital, in 1889 lecturer on midwifery (until 1913), and in 1902 chief gynæcologist. Her assistant was Ethel Vaughan-Sawyer. At the London School of Medicine for Women, she was the first woman to lecture in medical jurisprudence. In 1897, she obtained the Master of Surgery degree, thus being the first woman in Britain to secure the M.D. and the M.S. degrees. Scharlieb was the first woman to be elected to the honorary visiting staff of any general hospital in the UK. She remained in this post until 1908. Among her students was Helen Hanson, who was so inspired by Scharlieb that she followed her example and became a medical missionary in India.

She began her private practice after returning again to England, on 21 May 1887, with five patients in the morning, at 75 Park Street, where she shared an office with her medical student son. Five months later they moved to number 149 Harley Street, where she lived and practiced for nearly forty years.

She was a member of the Council of Obstetrics and Gynecological Section of the Royal Society of Medicine, but as a woman was not permitted to participate in the running of the society or the election of officers.

After she retired from her posts in 1909, she continued in her private professional work. Her new "leisure" time was devoted to public works and to speaking and writing.

In 1919 she was invited to give the eighth Norman Kerr Memorial Lecture by The Society for the Study of Inebriety, choosing as her topic, "The Relation of Alcohol and Alcoholism to Maternity and Child Welfare".

== Honours ==
In the 1926 Birthday Honours, she was made a Dame Commander of the Order of the British Empire. She was a member of the royal commission on Venereal Diseases 1913–16. From 1918 to 1930 she was president of the London School of Medicine for Women. In 1928, she received honorary LLD from Edinburgh University.

== World War I ==
After the outbreak of World War I she was offered (in September 1914) the charge of one of the Women's Hospitals in Belgium, but, realizing her age and her probable inability to stand the life, she declined. She offered to treat all officers' wives and Belgian women free of charge. She became Chairman of the Midwifery Committee of the Council of War Relief, and spent much of her time and remaining energies in its Maternity Hospital.

== Religious beliefs ==
Scharlieb believed in the idea of "religious vocation." While this motivated her to persevere in her career, it also meant that she carried conventional moral attitudes about sexuality. An extremely devout Anglo-Catholic (Anglican), she opposed contraception and divorce. She stated that "artificial contraceptives are wrong, morally, medically, rationally". She put in a powerful plea for the exercise of natural means of spacing the family. She spoke of divorce and her belief that it is unjust even to the guilty party, who, if a second union is contracted by the innocent partner, is "thereby prevented from making reparation and by this debarred from full repentance". She pleaded for the Church of England to strengthen and expand its own school system:

Among the queerest heresies is that which teaches that children ought not to be biassed, or, as they say, 'prejudiced' in their spiritual outlook ... [S]uch parents and guardians are, indeed, biassing and prejudicing their children's choice, because it is inevitable that children left without religious instruction must grow up in the belief that the truths of religion and the practice of religion cannot be of much importance to their parents.

== Feminism ==
An important theme in Scharlieb's writings was the importance of including a female point of view, in both medical and legislative arenas. This principle was also shown in her commitment to providing medical care for women in India.

Scharlieb was concerned with the issues of "racial degeneration" and "social purity". As such, she advocated for state support for mothers, so that they might produce a healthy next generation.

As a feminist she drew heavily on the theories of race superiority and argued that it was only natural that greater equality between the sexes in Britain should be achieved owing to their racial similarity. As a matter of fact, she argued, there is more physical, mental and moral resemblance "between an Englishman and an Englishwoman … than there is between an Englishman and a Bantu or Hottentot man."

== Writings ==
- A Woman's Words to Women (1895)
- The Mother's Guide to the Health and Care of her Children (1905)
- Womanhood and Race-regeneration (1912)
- The Seven Ages of Woman (1915)
- The Hope of the Future (1916)
- The Welfare of the Expectant Mother (1919)
- What Mothers must tell their Children (National Council for Combating Venereal Diseases. N.C.25.) (1925)
- Yet a More Excellent Way (novel) (1929)

Dr Scharlieb wrote an autobiography late in life.

- Reminiscences, Dr Mary Scharlieb C.B.E., J.P. (1924). London:Williams and Norgate

== Family ==
The Scharliebs had three children, two sons (born 1866 and 1870) and a daughter (born 1868).

== Legacy ==
In 1930, it was decided that a ward in the Royal Free Hospital would be named after her following construction of a new gynaecological and obstetrical unit at the hospital.

== See also ==
- Women physicians
