= John Davis (paediatrician) =

British paediatrician (1923–2025)

Professor John Davis FRCP
- Davis in 1991
- Born: John Allen Davis; 6 August 1923; Newcastle upon Tyne, England
- Died: 4 May 2025 (aged 101); Great Shelford, England
- Education: University of London
- Scientific career
- Fields: Paediatrics oncology
- Institutions: Paddington Green Children's Hospital

John Allen Davis (6 August 1923 – 4 May 2025) was a British paediatrician and the first professor of paediatrics at the University of Cambridge, later becoming emeritus. Davis was most notable for major research contributions to newborn physiology, particularly to the understanding of apnoea in the neonatal period.

== Background ==
Davis was the son of Major H.E. Davis, MC.

Davis took his clinical education the University of London, and was awarded a London University Gold Medal at graduation. After working with the British Army in Germany, Davis started his career at St Mary's Hospital, London, specialising in paediatrics. Further experience was gained in Paddington Green Children's Hospital in the hospital's Home Care Scheme. At Paddington, Davis worked with Donald Winnicott, who was to have a great influence on him.

Davis was married to Madeleine Vinicombe Davis née Ashlin (died 1991) who became an editor, and principal member of the Winnicott Publications Committee, established to edit Donald Winnicott's papers, for posthumous publication.

Davis died in Great Shelford on 4 May 2025, at the age of 101.

== Career ==
Davis was a Nuffield Research Fellow in Oxford, and conducted major research into newborn physiology, particularly related to the understanding of apnoea. As a senior lecturer and later reader at Hammersmith Hospital, Davis worked to improve and develop neonatal intensive care. Davis eventually became Professor of Child Health in Manchester, and after twelve years, he moved to Cambridge, becoming Foundation Professor of paediatrics at the University of Cambridge. Davis opened the Winnicott Research unit, named after Donald Winnicott in 1989.

== Awards ==
Davis was awarded the prestigious James Spence Medal in 1991.

== Bibliography ==
- Scientific foundations of paediatrics, John A Davis; John Dobbing. Baltimore: University Park Press, 1982
