= Ethel Vaughan-Sawyer =

British gynaecological surgeon (1868–1949)

Ethel May Vaughan-Sawyer
- Born: Ethel May Vaughan; 6 July 1868; Derby, Derbyshire
- Died: 9 March 1949 (aged 80); Mount Vernon Hospital, Northwood, London
- Education: University College London; London School of Medicine for Women
- Employer: Royal Free Hospital
- Organization(s): Royal Society of Medicine; Association of Registered Medical Women; Fabian Society

Ethel May Vaughan-Sawyer (6 July 1868 – 9 March 1949) was a British gynaecological surgeon. She was described by pioneering physician and feminist Louisa Garrett Anderson as "100 times better at her work than I am". A champion of women's rights to work and take part in political life, Vaughan-Sawyer described herself as an example of "healthy normal womanhood usefully and happily employed".

== Life ==
Ethel May Vaughan was born on 6 July 1868 in Derby, the oldest of eight children born to Cedric Vaughan and Jane Ellen Ridley. Her father was a locomotive engineer, who from 1872 was manager of the Hodbarrow Mining Company in Cumberland, where the family moved.

With her two younger sisters, Ethel was educated at a private school in Bottesford, Leicestershire, and later in Lausanne. From 1889, she studied at University College London, and in 1891 entered the London School of Medicine for Women, where she excelled. She graduated BS and MB in 1896, and MD in 1898.

In 1907, Vaughan married George Henry Vaughan-Sawyer, a captain and author. The marriage was happy and their daughter, Petronella Grace, was born on 31 August 1908. George Henry Vaughan-Sawyer was killed in action in 1914. Petronella Grace, a designer and illustrator, died in 1931 at the age of 22.

== Medical career ==
In 1897, Vaughan became assistant medical officer to Camberwell Infirmary. She subsequently became curator of the Royal Free Hospital's museum, and in 1899 clinical assistant to physician Raymond Crawfurd. In 1901, she spent time in Paris with fellow physician Louisa Garrett Anderson, visiting French hospitals.

By that year, Vaughan had established a private practice from her home in Brompton Square, South Kensington, alongside her friend Dr. Kate Marion Hunter. When, a year later, Mary Scharlieb was appointed physician for the diseases of women at the Royal Free Hospital, Vaughan was made her assistant. Scharlieb described Vaughan as both "a great pleasure to work with" and "one of the best and most skilful surgeons of the next generation".

On Scharlieb's retirement in 1908, Vaughan took over, assisted by Florence Willey. Vaughan also lectured at her alma mater, the London School of Medicine for Women. Following the birth of her daughter in August 1908, Vaughan (now Vaughan-Sawyer) returned to the operating table in November proving, as Claire Brock has written, "that medical women were more than capable of combining the roles of surgeon, wife, and mother." At the Royal Free Hospital, Vaughan's surgical skill was evident, as was her interest in new and developing surgeries, detailed in her case notes. Vaughan-Sawyer also retained a private practice in Harley Street, and was actively involved in both the Royal Society of Medicine's obstetric and gynaecological division, and the Association of Registered Medical Women. She lectured widely, and was a member of the Fabian Women's Group.

In 1920, Vaughan-Sawyer was part of a committee seeking to establish scholarships for Serbian women to train in medicine at the Royal Free Hospital.

Vaughan-Sawyer remained at the Royal Free Hospital until 1926, when her eyesight began to fail and she retired from her post. Two years later, she became the Royal Free Hospital's consulting gynaecologist.

== Death and legacy ==
Vaughan-Sawyer died on 9 March 1949 in hospital in Northwood, Middlesex, having lived for two years in St John's Guest House for the Blind in Worthing. On her death, a correspondent to The Times described her as having spoken of all the "calamities" of her life - and everything else - "with robust humour and a philosophy that had its roots in her deep and living faith." Her obituary in the same paper remembered her as "for many years a noted gynaecologist and obstetrician". An obituary was also published the British Medical Journal.

Ethel Vaughan-Sawyer's case notes are held by the London Metropolitan Archives.
