= George Alexander Sutherland =

British physician

George Alexander Sutherland CBE FRCP (11 April 1861, Old Machar, Aberdeen – 10 October 1939, Amersham) was a British physician, specializing in paediatrics and cardiology.

After secondary education at Aberdeen Grammar School, George Alexander Sutherland attended the University of Aberdeen, graduating with M.A. in 1882. He studied medicine at the University of Edinburgh, graduating M.B., C.M. in 1886. After studying at clinics in Vienna and qualifying as M.R.C.P.Lond, he received the higher medical doctorate M.D. from the University of Edinburgh in 1893. After serving on two voyages to Australia as a ship's surgeon, he was appointed a physician at Paddington Green Children's Hospital.

Sutherland was elected F.R.C.P. in 1903. He was the editor of A System of Diet and Dietetics, published in 1908, with a 2nd edition in 1925. He delivered the Lumleian Lectures (Modern Aspects of Heart Disease) in 1917.

Sutherland was appointed C.B.E. in 1920 for his service in the First World War as consulting physician to the Royal Air Force. For many years he was senior physician to the Hampstead General and North-West London Hospital and physician to the Paddington Green Children's Hospital.

== Selected publications ==
- The Treatment of Disease in Children. Oxford medical publications. Henry Frowde. 1907.
- A System of Diet and Dietetics. 1908.
- The Heart in Early Life. Oxford medical publications. 1914.
