= Una Ledingham =

British physician (1900–1965)

Una Christina Ledingham (2 January 1900 – 19 November 1965) was a British physician known for her studies of diabetes in pregnancy. She worked at the Marie Curie Hospital and Hampstead General Hospital, and was on the board of governors of the Royal Free Hospital (from 1957 to 1960) and the Royal College of Physicians. She was elected a Fellow of the Royal College of Physicians in 1942.

== Early life and education ==
Ledingham was born Una Christina Garvin to parents Christina and newspaper editor James J. L. Garvin, on 2 January 1900. She attended South Hampstead High School and London School of Medicine for Women, then went on to the University of London, where she received her MBBS degree in 1923. She held house posts at the Brompton, the Royal Free and Royal Northern Hospitals until 1925, and in the same year she married John Ledingham, with whom she had one son and one daughter. She earned her MD in 1927, from the London School of Medicine for Women; from 1925 to 1931, she was a staff registrar there and a became staff physician in 1931. At the Hampstead General Hospital and at the Marie Curie Hospital she developed a special interest in diabetes, and was an expert on the problems of the pregnant diabetic woman.

== Career ==
Ledingham was on staff at the Marie Curie Hospital and Hampstead General Hospital from 1931 until the end of her career. There, she studied diabetes in pregnancy. She became an expert on the problems of diabetic and pregnant women. During World War 2, she managed her husband's medical practice while keeping up with her own medical work.

== Honours and legacy ==
Ledingham served on a number of committees and boards. These included the board of governors of the Royal Free Hospital (from 1957 to 1960) and the Royal College of Physicians, where she was elected a fellow in 1942. She also served as an examiner for the London University. She died on the 19 November 1965. Ledingham's son became a doctor at Westminster Hospital.
