= Eleanor Davies-Colley =

British surgeon

Eleanor Davies-Colley FRCS (21 August 1874 – 10 December 1934) was a British surgeon and the first woman to be admitted to the Fellows of the Royal College of Surgeons of England. In 1912, Davies-Colley co-founded of the South London Hospital for Women and Children alongside Maud Chadburn.

== Early life ==
Davies-Colley was born on 21 August 1874 in Petworth, Sussex to John Neville Colley Davies-Colley, a surgeon at Guy's Hospital, and Sophia Margaret Davies-Colley (née Turner). One of four siblings, Davies-Colley was the sister of Hugh Davies-Colley, a military surgeon, Robert Davies-Colley, a consultant surgeon at Guy's, and the painter Frances Baker. She was also the cousin of the political activist and editor Harriet Shaw Weaver.

Raised in Sussex and Harley Street, Davies-Colley was educated at Baker Street High School for Girls and Queen's College. After leaving school, she at first worked with poor children in London's East End.

== Medical education and career ==
Davies-Colley studied medicine at the London School of Medicine for Women (1902–07), achieving the MB BS degree in 1907, and was awarded the MD degree by the University of London in 1910. In 1911, she became the first female fellow of the Royal College of Surgeons.

Davies-Colley's career as a surgeon spanned almost thirty years. On graduating in 1907, she became a house surgeon under Maud Chadburn (with whom she was to live and work for twenty-five years) at the New Hospital for Women, (later renamed the Elizabeth Garrett Anderson Hospital and now part of the University College London Hospitals). She then became demonstrator in anatomy at the London School of Medicine and surgical registrar at the Royal Free Hospital. In addition to her work at the South London Hospital, in later life she was also a surgeon at the Marie Curie Cancer Hospital and senior obstetrician at the Elizabeth Garrett Anderson Hospital.

In 1917, she was one of the founding members of the Medical Women's Federation.

== South London Hospital for Women and Children ==
Davies-Colley and her colleague Maud Chadburn began raising funds in 1911 for a new South London Hospital for Women and Children. At that time, such hospitals served the dual purpose of improving medical care for women and enhancing career prospects for female medical practitioners, as many hospitals refused to employ women. Aided by her cousin Harriet Weaver and other feminists, enough money was raised to open an outpatients' department in Newington Causeway in 1912. A purpose-built eighty-bed hospital on Clapham Common, staffed entirely by women, was opened by Queen Mary on 4 July 1916. Davies-Colley worked at the South London Hospital for Women and Children from its foundation until her death, holding various positions including senior surgeon.

The hospital remained open until 1984. It was unusual in retaining the women-only staffing policy, initiated by Davies-Colley and Chadburn, right up until closure.

== Death and legacy ==
Davies-Colley died suddenly of thyroid toxaemia in London in 1934.

One of the Royal College of Surgeons' lecture theatres at Lincoln's Inn Fields was refurbished and dedicated in Eleanor Davies-Colley's memory in 2004, with the aim of celebrating the role of women in surgery and encouraging more women to enter the profession. A major fundraising drive (led by another pioneering woman surgeon, Averil Mansfield, the first woman to become a professor of surgery in the UK) raised nearly a quarter of a million pounds for the project. The lecture theatre contains a visual representation featuring Eleanor Davies-Colley and other pioneering female surgeons.
