= London School of Medicine for Women =

First medical school for women

Coordinates: 51.5256°N 0.1233°W

The London School of Medicine for Women (LSMW) established in 1874 was the first medical school in Britain to train women as doctors. The patrons, vice-presidents, and members of the committee that supported and helped found the London School of Medicine for Women wanted to provide educated women with the necessary facilities for learning and practicing midwifery and other branches of medicine while also promoting their future employment in the fields of midwifery and other fields of treatment for women and children.

In 1877 the Royal Free Hospital accepted women students from LSMW to complete their clinical studies there, and by 1896 it had been renamed as the London Royal Free Hospital School of Medicine for Women, becoming part of the University of London. In 1947 the school became co-educational and was renamed as the Royal Free Hospital School of Medicine.

In 1998, the school merged with the University College Hospital Medical School under the new name of Royal Free and University College Medical School. In 2008, this name was shortened to UCL Medical School.

== History ==
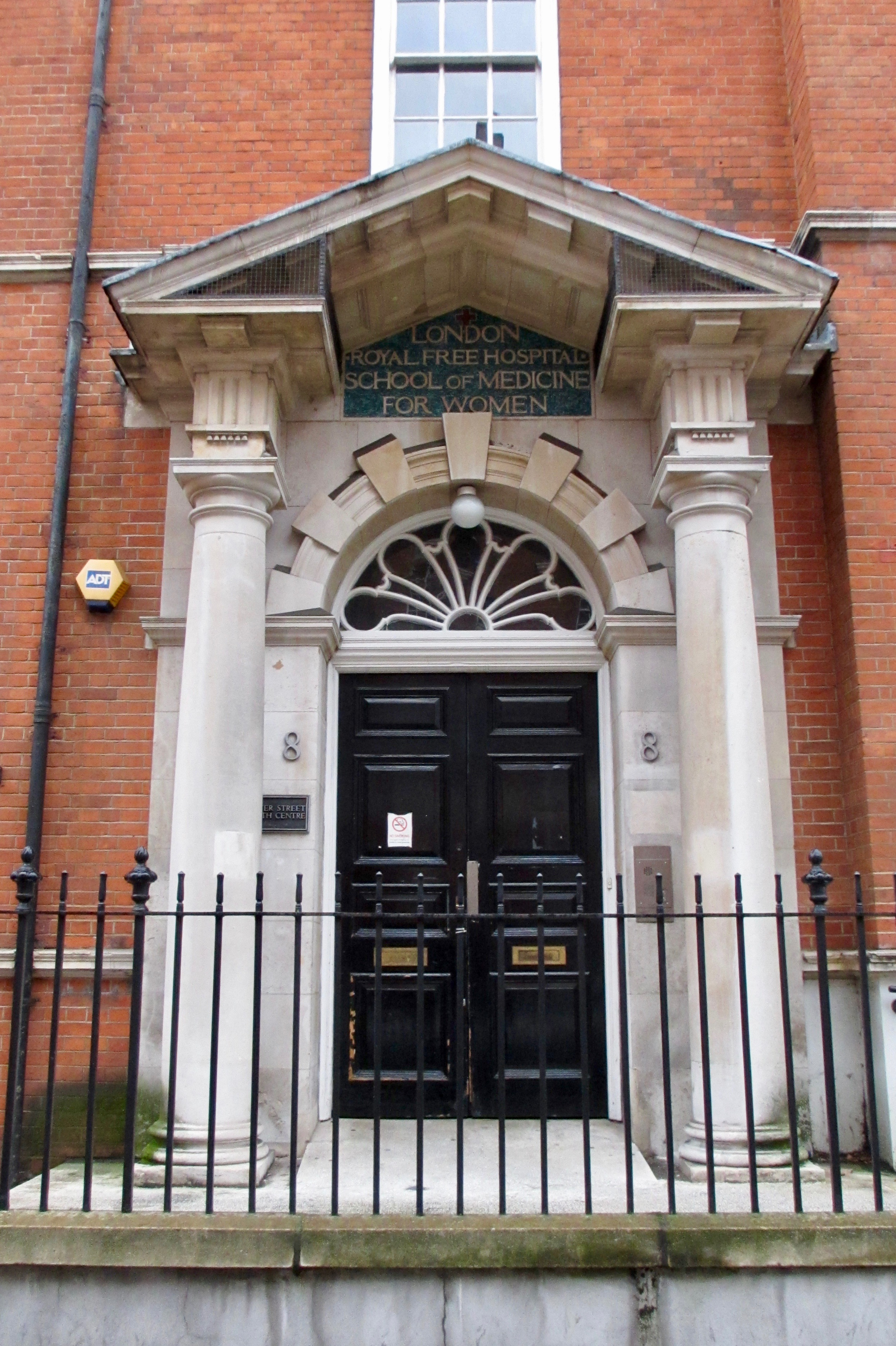
London School of Medicine for Women, Hunter Street.

The school was formed in 1874 by an association of pioneering women physicians Sophia Jex-Blake, Elizabeth Garrett Anderson, Emily Blackwell and Elizabeth Blackwell with Thomas Henry Huxley. The founding was motivated at least in part by Jex-Blake's frustrated attempts at getting a medical degree at a time when women were not admitted to British medical schools, thus being expelled from Edinburgh University. Other women who had studied with Jex-Blake in Edinburgh joined her at the London school, including Isabel Thorne who succeeded her as honorary secretary in 1877. She departed to start a medical practice in Edinburgh where she would found the Edinburgh School of Medicine for Women in 1886.

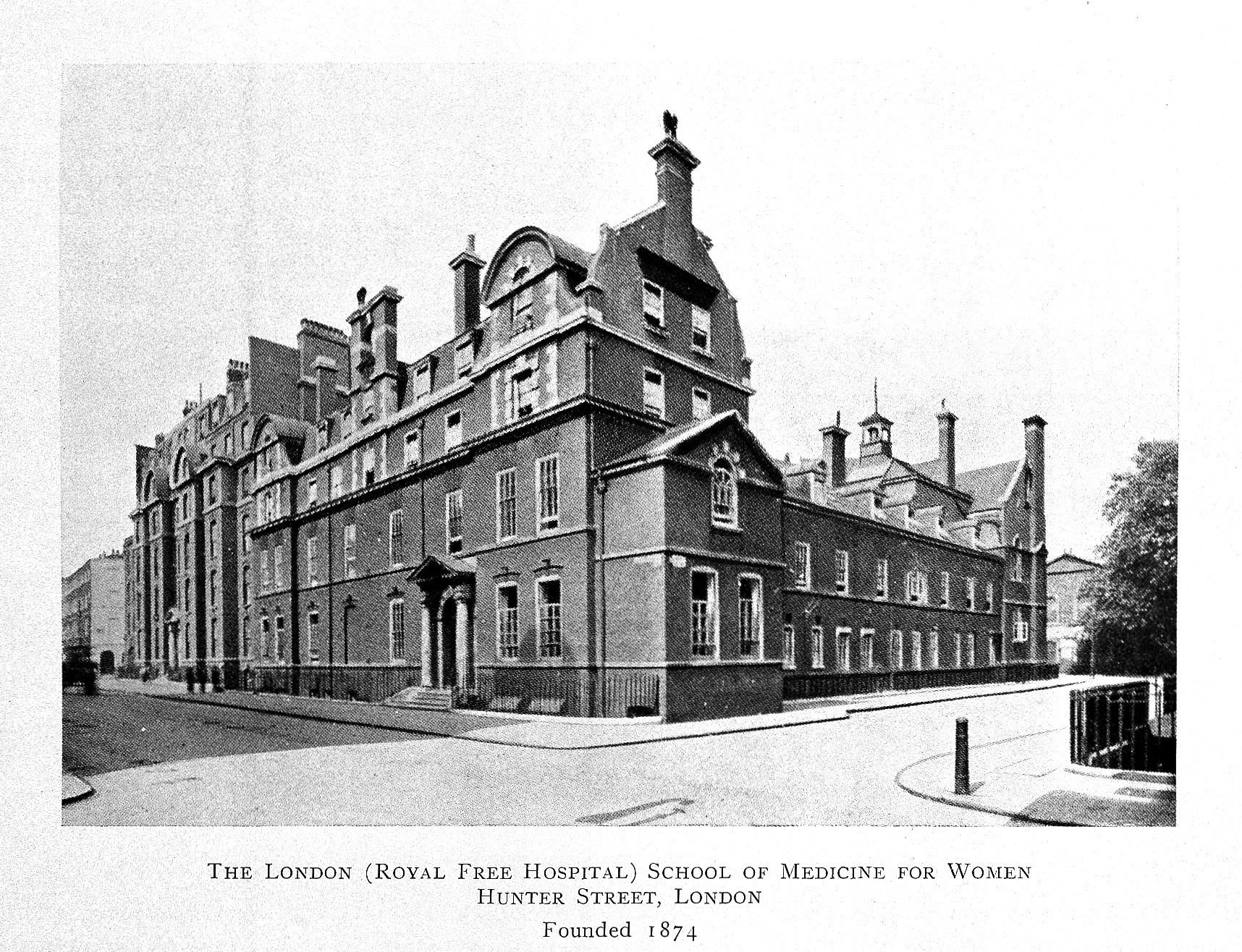
Royal Free Hospital – School of Medicine for Women, Hunter Street.

The Medical Act 1876 (39 & 40 Vict. c. 41) was an act which repealed the previous Medical Act in the United Kingdom and allowed the medical authorities to license all qualified applicants irrespective of gender. In 1877 an agreement was reached with the Royal Free Hospital that allowed students at the London School of Medicine for Women to complete their clinical studies there. The Royal Free Hospital was the first teaching hospital in London to admit women for training.

Elizabeth Garrett Anderson was Dean (1883–1903) while the school was rebuilt, became part of the University of London and consolidated association with the Royal Free Hospital. In 1896, the School was officially renamed the London (Royal Free Hospital) School of Medicine for Women.

In 1894, a well known Indian feminist Rukhmabai qualified in medicine after attending the London School of Medicine for Women. The number of Indian women students steadily increased so that by 1920 the school, in co-operation with the India Office opened a hostel for female Indian medical students.

In 1914, the school was further expanded due to the number of women wishing to study medicine, making it necessary to double the number of laboratories and lecture rooms. At the time of expansion, the school had over 300 students enrolled, making it the largest women's university college in Britain.

In 1998, it merged with the University College Hospital's medical school to form the UCL Medical School.

== Background about the founders ==
=== Elizabeth Blackwell ===
Elizabeth Blackwell was the first woman from the United States of America to receive a medical degree. Born in Bristol, England on 3 February 1821, Elizabeth Blackwell was the third of nine children in the family. Among the many family members, Blackwell had famous relatives, including her brother Henry, a well-known abolitionist and women's rights supporter.

In 1832, Blackwell moved to America, specifically settling in Cincinnati, Ohio. In 1838, Blackwell's father, Samuel Blackwell, died, leaving the family in poor economic status during a national economic crisis. Because of this, Blackwell received her first occupational job as a teacher along with her mother and her sisters. Blackwell's inspiration for medicine sparked during a conversation with her dying friend, stating her situation would have been better if she had been a female physician. While teaching, Blackwell boarded two male physicians from the south, allowing her to attain her first real knowledge of the medical field through the mentoring from the two physicians.

In 1847, Blackwell applied to college, getting rejected from everywhere she applied, except from Geneva College who accepted her as a practical joke. After receiving years of discrimination, Blackwell eventually graduated first in her class, slowly earning the respect of her professors and educators. Blackwell then returned to New York City, opening a small clinic with the help of her Quaker friends. There she provided positions for women physicians during the Civil War, training women nurses for the union hospitals.

In 1869, she left New York City to return to England. From 1875 to 1877 she lectured on gynecology at the newly built London School of Medicine for Women.

=== Sophia Jex-Blake ===
Sophia Jex-Blake was born in Hastings, UK in 1840. After attending various private schools, Jex-Blake attended Queen's College. Jex-Blake's pursuit of an occupation in the field of medicine lead to the desire to enroll in the University of Edinburgh to study medicine. Jex-Blake's desire to attend the University of Edinburgh was hindered because the university did not allow women to attend. To fight this, Jex-Blake opened a court case against the university, resulting in an unsuccessful ruling in favor of the University of Edinburgh.

In 1889, the Act of Parliament ruled for degrees for women, largely resulting because of Jex-Blake's struggles. This allowed Sophia Jex-Blake to become one of the first female doctors in the UK. Jex-Blake then founded the London School of Medicine for Women as well as the Edinburgh School of Medicine for Women.

=== Elizabeth Garrett Anderson ===
Elizabeth Garrett Anderson was born in Whitechapel, London and received a good education. She chose to pursue a medical career after meeting Doctor Elizabeth Blackwell. After applying to several medical schools, Anderson got rejected from all of those she applied to. Thus, Anderson enrolled as a nurse in Middlesex Hospital and was appointed to the position of medical attendant in 1866 at St. Mary's Dispensary. Still wishing to become a doctor, Anderson successfully pursued a medical degree in France.

Returning to London, Anderson assisted in the founding of the New Hospital for Women at the St. Mary's Dispensary and the London School of Medicine for Women. Anderson would later oversee the London School's expansion after she received the position of Dean in 1883, after which she also appointed Blackwell as a Professor of Gynaecology. The school was later renamed to the Elizabeth Garrett Anderson Hospital, which was eventually made part of the University of London.

== Notable alumni ==
- Isabella Mears, medical missionary to China, founder and director of the Woodburn Sanatorium, and Translator of Chinese texts. Entered in 1875.
- Dame Louisa Aldrich-Blake, first woman in Britain to be awarded the degree of Master of Surgery.
- Florence Barrett, consultant surgeon at the Mothers' Hospital in Clapton and the Royal Free Hospital in London, graduated 1906
- Diana Beck, consultant neurosurgeon at Middlesex Hospital, graduated 1925
- Julia Bell, human geneticist and member of the Royal College of Physicians, graduated 1920
- Rosemary Biggs, haematologist, graduated 1943
- Margery Blackie, homeopath to Queen Elizabeth II, graduated 1923
- Mary Alice Blair, surgeon and Unit Administrator with the Scottish Women's Hospital for Foreign Service, graduated 1910
- Margaret Boileau, doctor and surgeon from Norfolk, graduated 1906
- Ruth Bowden, professor of anatomy at the Royal Free Hospital School of Medicine, graduated 1940
- Winifred Buckley, army surgeon at the Endell Street Military Hospital, graduated c. 1910
- Fanny Jane Butler, in first graduating class, 1880; known as first English, fully trained medical missionary in India
- Dame Hilda Bynoe, Governor of Grenada, graduated 1951
- Phillis Emily Cunnington, collector, writer and historian on costume and fashion, graduated 1918
- Janet Elizabeth Lane-Claypon, a founder of the science of epidemiology, graduated 1901
- Eleanor Davies-Colley, surgeon, first female FRCS, co-founder of the South London Hospital for Women and Children, graduated 1907
- Katharine Dormandy, haematologist at the Royal Free Hospital, graduated 1951
- Eva Frommer, pioneering child psychiatrist, founder of the Children's Day Hospital and foundation member of the Royal College of Psychiatrists, graduated 1952
- Frances Gardner, consultant cardiologist at the Royal Free Hospital, graduated 1940
- Louisa Garrett Anderson, co-founder of Women's Hospital for Children, co-founder and Chief Surgeon of Women's Hospital Corps, graduated circa 1897
- Mary Gordon, first British female prison inspector, graduated 1890
- Mary Esther Harding, Jungian psychoanalyst, graduated 1910
- Dorothy Christian Hare, medical director of the Women's Royal Naval Service
- Charlotte Leighton Houlton, chief medical officer, Women's Medical Service of India (1935–1939)
- Jerusha Jhirad, the first Indian woman with a degree in obstetrics and gynaecology, graduated 1919
- Mary Lucas Keene, professor of anatomy, graduated 1911
- Una Ledingham, expert on diabetes and pregnancy, graduated 1927
- Katharine Lloyd-Williams, anaesthetist, graduated 1926
- Margaret Lowenfeld, child psychologist, psychotherapist and paediatrician, graduated 1918
- Isabella Macdonald Macdonald, graduated in 1888, one of the first few women in the UK to do so
- Helen Mackay, the first female fellow of the Royal College of Physicians
- Flora Murray, co-founder of Women's Hospital for Children and the Women's Hospital Corps, graduated circa 1895
- Christine Murrell, first female member of the British Medical Association Central Council, graduated 1899
- Doris Lyne Officer, graduated 1921
- Elizabeth Margaret Pace, gynocologist, graduated 1891
- Sylvia Payne, president of the British Psychoanalytical Society
- Innes Hope Pearse, co-founder of the Pioneer Health Centre and the Peckham Experiment, graduated 1915
- Frances Helen Prideaux, known as "one of the most distinguished students" of the School and first woman to be appointed to a London hospital in an open competition with men, graduated 1884
- Gladys Maud Sandes, surgeon, venereologist, and first woman physician at London Lock Hospital, graduated 1922
- Sophia Seekings Friel, one of the first Maternity and Child Welfare Inspectors and co-founder of the Tottenham 'school for mothers'
- Edith Shove, graduated 1882
- Honor Smith, neurologist, graduated 1937
- Lucy Naish nee Wellburn, pioneering paediatric doctor, infant welfare specialist and professor of medicine in Sheffield and mother of Alice Stewart, epidemiologist who revolutionized the understanding of radiation risk, graduated 1902
- Mary Sturge, graduated 1891
- Ethel Vaughan-Sawyer, gynaecological surgeon
- Alice Vickery, the first British woman to qualify as chemist and druggist
- Jane Elizabeth Waterston, in first graduating class, 1880; known as first woman doctor in South Africa.
- Elizabeth Mary Wells, missionary and doctor in East Africa
- Lucy Wills, discovered nutritional factor in yeast (folate), which prevented macrocytic anaemia in pregnancy.
- Helen Mary Wilson, physician and social campaigner.
- Helena Rosa Wright, surgeon, birth control pioneer both in the UK and internationally, graduated 1914

== Merger with University College Hospital Medical School ==
From 1947 the school admitted men and was renamed the Royal Free Hospital School of Medicine. It faced possible closure several times, but continued to operate independently until 1998, when it merged with the University College Hospital Medical School to create the Royal Free and University College Medical School. This is now the UCL Medical School.The building later housed the British College of Acupuncture and the Hunter Street Health Centre in 2008.

== See also ==
- New Hospital for Women, also founded by Elizabeth Garrett Anderson
- Edinburgh School of Medicine for Women
- Women in medicine
- Henrietta Stanley, Baroness Stanley of Alderley, one of the campaigners for the London School of Medicine for Women.
