= Endell Street Military Hospital =

- Royal Army Medical Corps, War Office
- An Operation at the Military Hospital, Endell Street - Dr L Garrett, Dr Flora Murray, Dr W Buckley, Francis Dodd, 1920. Imperial War Museum, London.

- Location within Westminster

Geography
- Location: 36, Endell Street, London, England, United Kingdom
- Coordinates: 51.5154°N 0.1255°W

Organisation
- Type: Military hospital

Services
- Beds: 573

History
- Opened: May 1915
- Closed: December 1919

Links
- Lists: Hospitals in England

Endell Street Military Hospital was a First World War military hospital located on Endell Street in Covent Garden, central London. The hospital was substantially staffed by suffragettes (women who fought for their right to vote in public elections).

The medical pioneers Flora Murray and Louisa Garrett Anderson recruited enough medically trained women to staff an entire hospital in France at the beginning of the war that was in operation from 1914 to 1915. Drawing experience and staff of this hospital, the Endell Street hospital was established in London as a RAMC hospital under the War department in May 1915 by Murray and Anderson. The Endell hospital had 573 beds, allowing for some 26,000 patients to be cared for during the five years it was active. The hospital closed shortly after the end of the war in December 1919.

The hospital adopted the motto, "Deeds not words", which was also the motto of the WSPU. Despite scepticism by the RAMC in the women's medical staff ability to run a hospital, Endell Street received high feedback from patients, recognition in professional medical journals, and the successful treatment of a large number of soldiers during its operation.

== Establishment of the hospital ==
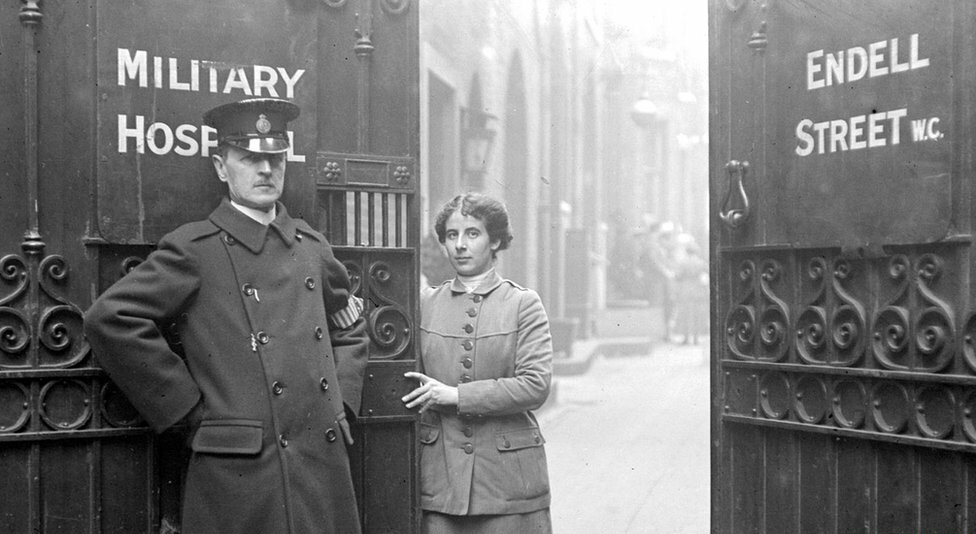
Entrance to Endell Street Military Hospital, c. 1915

The concept of the Women's Hospital Corps was created and instituted in 1914. Previously met with hostility by officials, Doctors Flora Murray and Louisa Garrett Anderson decided to bypass the British government by going directly to the French Embassy with their offer to run a military hospital in Wimereux, France. Their idea was accepted and they were granted work permits to travel to France. In less than two weeks, Murray and Anderson were able to recruit enough medically trained women to staff an entire hospital; doctors, nurses, orderlies, and clerks. The women created uniforms and raised funds for the supplies needed. Visitors to the hospital in France included Queen Amélie of Portugal. The hospital closed in January 1915 when injured soldiers started being treated in England rather than in France.

The hospital at Endell Street was established by Murray and Anderson in May 1915. It was constructed in the former St Giles Union Workhouse on Endell Street in Covent Garden, Central London. The empty workhouse had room for a larger hospital to operate. Most of the hospital equipment came from the military hospital in Wimereux, France following its closure in January 1915.

Although designed for 520 beds, shortly after it opened orders were received to put up as many extra beds as possible. From 1916 until the summer of 1919, the official number of beds was 573. Several auxiliary Voluntary Aid Detachment hospitals with a total of 150 beds were attached to the Endell Street hospital. At times of pressure when billeting of convalescent men was allowed, the number of registered patients was as high as 800.

Endell Street Hospital cared for some 26,000 patients during the five years it was active. The women surgeons performed some 20 operations per day during that time. Sometimes as many as 80 injured soldiers would arrive each night.

The hospital was close to London's main railway stations, allowing a great influx of patients when ambulance convoys arrived. Often each convoy was transporting 30 to 50 injured soldiers, some of which required immediate surgery. These soldiers were taken directly to the operating theatre. The surgeons routinely carried out over 20 operations a day from soldiers delivered from the convoys, which would often arrive late at night and sometimes arrived with as many as eighty soldiers.

Of the twenty-six thousand patients who passed through the wards of Endell Street Military Hospital, the largest number were British with a fair proportion of Dominion and Colonial troops. There were also two thousand two hundred and seven Canadians. There were more than two thousand Australian and New Zealand patients, including those wounded in the Gallipoli campaign that began arriving in August 1915. Only two hundred U.S. troops were patients. A small number of Russian, Greek Japananes, and French wounded were patients at the hospital. A small ward for service women was opened, late in the hospital's life. Some satellite hospitals were also established including Dollis Hill House Auxiliary Hospital which opened in 1916.

== Staff ==
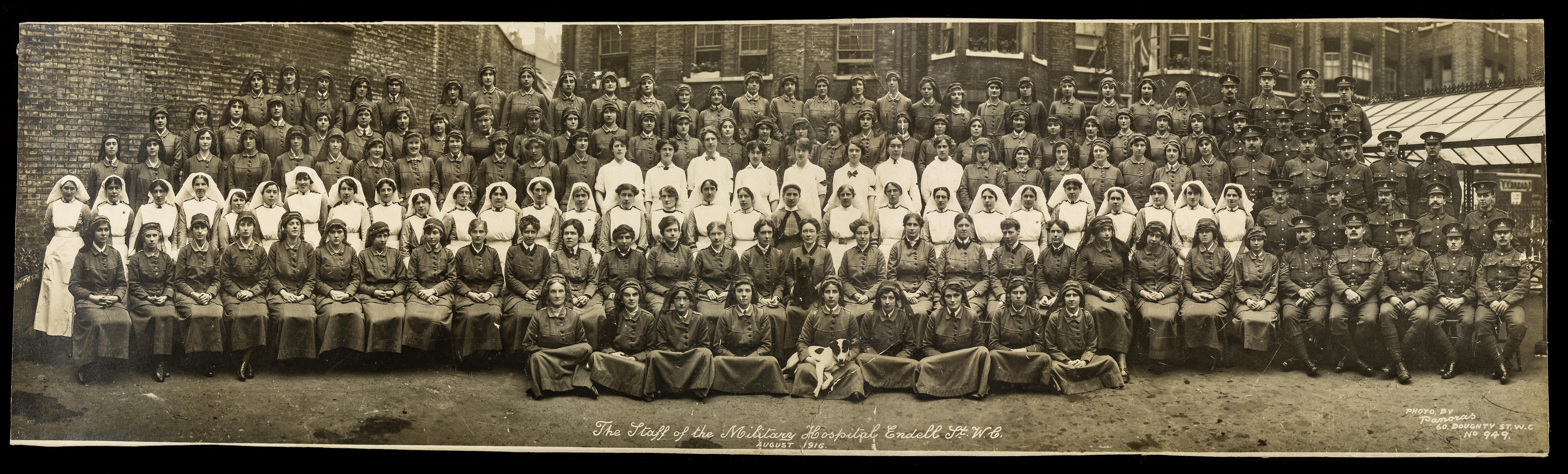
Hospital staff in August 1916

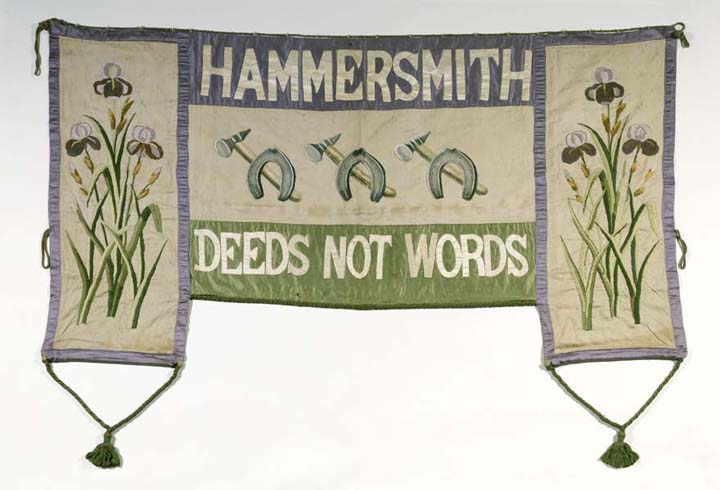
WSPU "Deeds, Not Words" Banner c. 1910

Margaret (Peggy) Katherine Turnbull (1892–1980) in the nursing uniform of the Endell Street Military Hospital, 1915

Leading the hospital, Murray was named Doctor in Charge and Anderson was named Chief Surgeon. Many of the clinicians who staffed the hospital had previously worked at the hospital in Wimereux. When that hospital closed, the suffragettes were relocated to the new Endell Street hospital. At Endell Street, these clinicians worked in what was considered female-appropriate jobs as nurses, orderlies, and clerks. The hospital also staffed women as drivers, dentists, pathologists, and surgeons. One such surgeon was Mrs Lilian Marie Wemyss Grant who worked at Endell Street as an Assistant Surgeon before going as Medical Officer in 1918 to HM Factory, Gretna.

Librarians and entertainment officers visited with the patients to heighten morale. Gardeners helped in the courtyard and people without family or friends at the hospital came to spend time with a lonely patient.

While working under the authority of the War Office, women doctors at the Endell Street Military Hospital received the pay and benefits of military grades from lieutenant to lieutenant colonel, but they had no rank and could not command men.

The hospital adopted the WSPU's motto of "Deeds, Not Words". The women hoped that eventually the hospital and their deeds would prove women's equality and their ability to fulfil their duties as citizens.

The RAMC was outspoken about their reluctance to allow an all women's staff to run a military hospital. The staff's involvement in the suffrage movement also added to the RAMC's scepticism of the women's ability perform in a professional manner. Murray recounts a colonel who was disgusted by the idea, exclaiming "what difficulties you will have". The RAMC felt that the women would not be properly trained to care for and control soldiers in the military setting. They were proven wrong when the women received all positive acknowledgments due to their "feminine touches" around the hospital. Flowers, bright colours, and proper lighting—all of which contrasted with the drabness of military hospitals—were attributed to the women's ability to consider the patient's psychological health as well as their physical health.

During the hospital's active years, Endell Street Military Hospital staff were able to publish seven publications in The Lancet. The papers were in written in collaboration with the Scottish Women's Hospitals for Foreign Service and included an analysis of a series of cases of anaerobic infection. They collaborated with the Pasteur Institute in trials of gas gangrene antiserum by Frances Ivens from the Scottish Women's Hospital at Royaumont. Endell Street and Royaumont together produced the first hospital-based research papers published by female British doctors.

== Closure ==
In 1917, Murray and Anderson each received the CBE for their work in the hospital. In October 1919, Endell Street received orders to evacuate and close the hospital. Endell Street Military Hospital closed in December 1919. The hospital was subsequently demolished and the site now forms part of the area occupied by the Oasis Sports Centre. A plaque commemorating those hospital staff who died in the First World War was located in the Royal Free Hospital in London but has since been lost.

In November 2017 the Imperial War Museum made an award to Alison Ramsey of Digital Drama for "Deeds Not Words; Suffragette Surgeons of WWI", a film about the hospital.

== Sources ==
- Murray, Flora (1920). Women as Army Surgeons: Being the history of the Women's Hospital Corps in Paris, Wimereux, and Endell Street September 1914–October 1919. London: Hodder & Stoughton.
