= Margaret Boileau =

Margaret Lucy Augusta Boileau
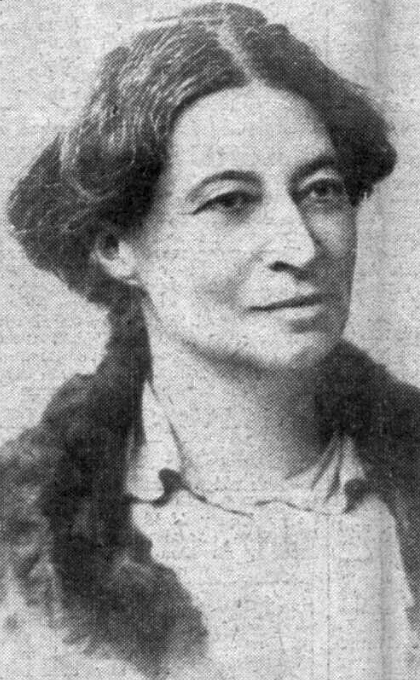
- Born: 18 July 1867; Ketteringham
- Died: 17 September 1923 (aged 56); Norwich
- Education: London School of Medicine for Women
- Occupations: Doctor, surgeon

Margaret Lucy Augusta Boileau (18 July 1867 – 17 September 1923) was an English medical doctor, surgeon, suffragist and philanthropist. On her premature death from cancer in 1923, she was widely lauded for having shown 'devotion to the cause of knowledge' in carefully recording the course of her disease in the name of medical research.

== Life ==
Margaret Boileau was born in Ketteringham, Norfolk, on 18 July 1867, to Sir Francis George Manningham Boileau and Lucy Henrietta Nugent. Her brother was Sir Maurice Boileau. For the first thirty years of her life, Boileau travelled widely with her father, starting to study medicine only in her thirties. She qualified as a doctor in 1906, having studied at the London School of Medicine for Women. Boileau worked at the New Hospital for Women and at Ravenscourt Park Hospital.

Boileau was a supporter of women's suffrage (described as 'ardent but not militant') and of the Labour Party. She was also an active supporter of Hellesdon Hospital, the Girl Guide movement, the Church Missionary Society, and the Young Women's Christian Association. Boileau was said to have 'devoted herself to public, philanthropic, and social work'. During World War I, she cared for wounded soldiers at Ketteringham Hall, Norfolk and was commandant of the Voluntary Aid Detachment hospital at Swainsthorpe.

== Death ==
When Boileau was diagnosed with cancer, she 'gathered at her bedside a band of devoted women', to whom she 'daily described her symptoms in the interests of medical research'. She died on 17 September 1923 at the age of 56. On her death, Boileau left £200 'to the Norfolk and Norwich Staff of Nurses, Ltd.', and £100 each to the Norfolk and Norwich Hospital, the Royal Free Hospital, and the Elizabeth Garrett Anderson Hospital.
