= Katharine Dormandy =

English haematologist

Katharine Marian Dormandy (née Baker; 20 April 1926 – 30 May 1978) was an English haematologist. She worked in bleeding disorders, particularly haemophilia, and established the haemophilia service at the Royal Free Hospital in London.

== Biography ==
Katharine Baker was born in 1926 in Oxford; her father was George Brindley Aufrere Baker, an air vice-marshal in the Royal Air Force. She enrolled at the London School of Medicine for Women in 1945 and graduated as MBBS in 1951. The same year, she married Thomas Dormandy, one of the first male students at the school, which had been renamed the Royal Free Hospital School of Medicine. She held house and registrar posts at the Royal Free Hospital and Central Middlesex Hospital until 1954, when she qualified as a member of the Royal College of Physicians. For two years, she performed research at Central Middlesex and St Mary's Hospital, and in 1956 she took up a registrar position in haematology at Great Ormond Street Hospital, where she worked mainly with haemophiliac boys. In 1964, she returned to the Royal Free Hospital as an honorary consultant and senior lecturer in haematology.

After her appointment at the Royal Free, Dormandy set about establishing a haemophilia centre at the hospital. The service initially ran out of a caravan parked outside the hospital that had been donated by the Haemophilia Society. Dormandy also campaigned for the creation of a special boarding school for haemophiliacs, since many were forced to miss large amounts of school. Her plans for a dedicated school did not eventuate, but her work led to the adoption of treatment facilities at Treloar School, a school for the disabled, which then attracted more haemophiliac students. By 1970, the haemophilia centre at the Royal Free had expanded to utilise the veranda of an existing ward; although its premises were located in a caravan and a veranda, it was designated an "international centre" by the World Federation of Haemophilia. Dormandy was appointed a university reader in 1970 and was awarded a Doctor of Medicine for a thesis on von Willebrand disease. In 1977, she was elected Fellow of the Royal College of Physicians and received the inaugural gold medal of the Haemophilia Society, named for Robert Gwyn Macfarlane.

Dormandy died from cancer on 30 May 1978. A dedicated building for haematology was constructed at the Royal Free in 1978, but Dormandy died before it was finished; it was named the Katharine Dormandy Haemophilia Centre.
