= Oasis Sports Centre, London =

Leisure centre in Holborn, London

Coordinates: 51.51566°N 0.125903°W

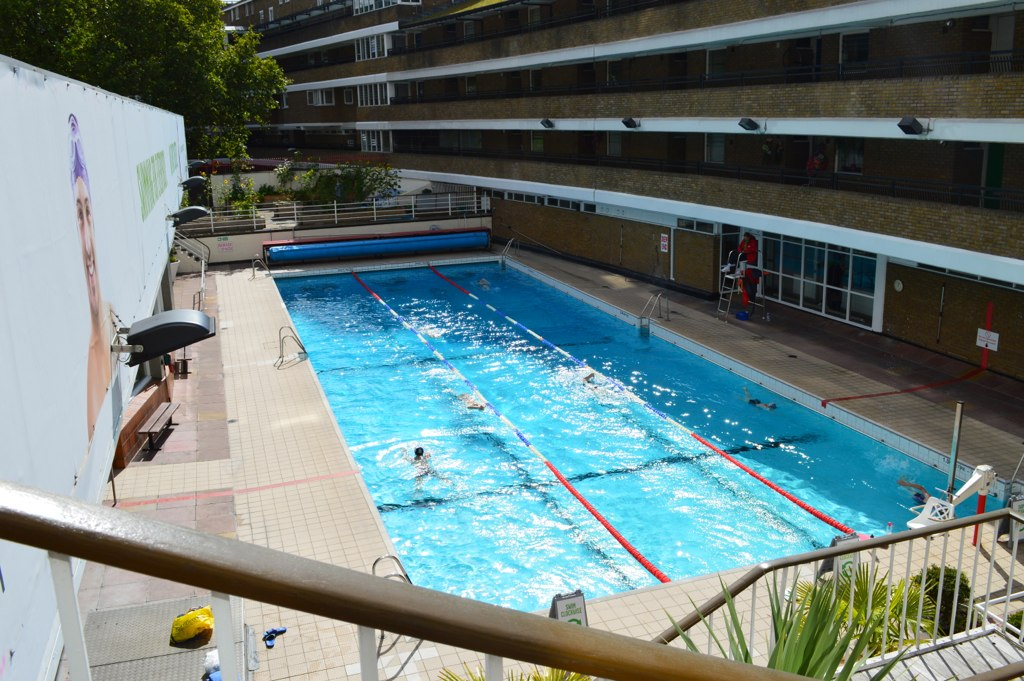
The outdoor pool at the Oasis.

Oasis Sports Centre is a leisure centre in Holborn, London, operated by Better on behalf of the London Borough of Camden.

== Facilities ==
The centre has two pools, a 27.5 x 10 m heated outdoor pool heated to a target temperature of 26°C, and a 25 x 9 m indoor pool. There is a poolside sauna, a gym, squash courts and cafeteria.

== History ==
=== Early history ===
The site has a long history of being an early public swimming pool. The pool was first built c.1728 as the "Bagno", a Turkish bathhouse. (Note: It is not known exactly what type of establishment this would have been at this time. See: Bagnio#In_English) In 1840 the bathhouse closed and the site was eventually reopened by local parishes as the "Bloomsbury Baths and Washhouses" in 1852. At that time there were two indoor swimming baths.

Between 1900 and 1902 the baths were rebuilt and reopened as "Holborn Baths". This had two covered pools.

The site was modernized in the 1930s and after an architectural competition the "Swimstad" plan was approved. Peter Stechman has the original artist impression of the Swimstadt plan. Building started in 1937 but work halted at the start of the war. After the war, cash shortages lead to the complex not being completed and it was converted to an outdoor swimming pool, opening in June 1946 using wartime gas decontamination rooms as changing facilities. Much of the work to reopen the outdoor pool was carried out by staff using discarded war materials.

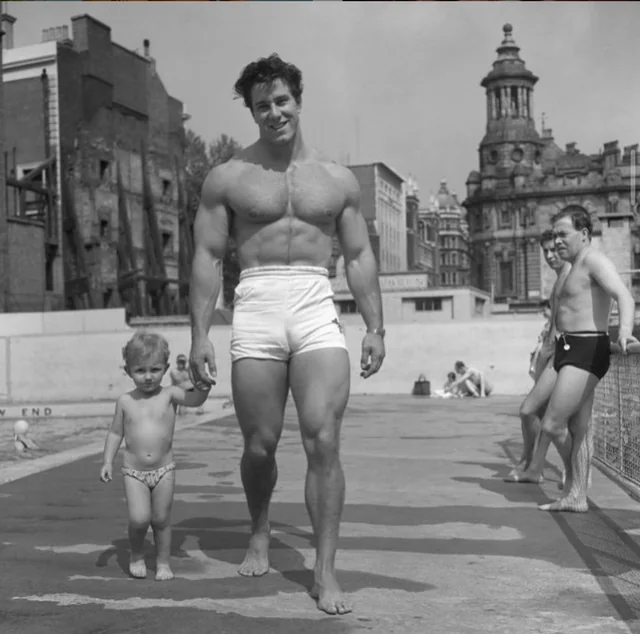
Reg Park by the pool soon after WW2

=== 1960s and 1970s ===
In 1960, the outdoor pool size was reduced to 27.5 by 9.5 metres, and a 25 x 9 metre indoor pool was added to the site using all plant materials and pool sizes were made to metric specifications with the Becco sand filters as well as being rubber lined. There is also a child's paddling pool termed 'Kiddies Corner'. The upper sun terrace was designed to give a 'ship's deck' atmosphere. The rebuilding works were funded by a planning benefit arranged by Stanley Thomas, Chair of Holborn BC Leisure with the Hammersons group. It included the 10 storey office block, Berkshire House, as a facade and front entrance from High Holborn plus sun bathing terraces built above the indoor pool and the rear underground car park area.

In 1972 the first Local Authority run Sauna Cabins was opened with hand massage on a marble slab.

During the IRA campaign, a car bomb was placed outside the front entrance to the office block in High Holborn, with the result that all 10 floor windows, back and front, were blown out. Security staff were injured, but fortunately there were no fatalities. The pool opened the next day, via a back entrance, only 30 minutes later than its normal time.

=== 1980s to present ===
In 1983 the site was reconfigured. The entrance building on Endell Street was demolished and offices, a new public and establishment laundry plus warm baths and shower facilities, were installed on the ground floor. Three floors of sheltered housing for elderly people were built above this, and Dudley Court occupied the ground of the demolished Workhouse at the rear. Skeletons were found in the workhouse earth basements of the former workhouse inmates, which stopped work for a while. In 1989, the installation of a good quality full width Glatz Pioneer heat retention cover enabled Peter Stechman, Sports Centre Manager, to run the heated outdoor pool all year round. This practice was later copied by other London pool operators, Hampton and London Fields Lido. On 1 May 1985 a dry sports area consisting of two multi use activity halls and 3 glass backed squash courts were added.

From 1986 to 1987 the indoor pool was closed for refurbishment, the pool surround was waterproofed, and the Esavian sliding ships doors were removed and replaced with a permanent brick and glass partition, while the outdoor pool stayed open. In the mid 1990s the main sports hall was converted to a multi exercise equipment gym and the sauna was relocated to the previous warm baths and shower area to provide a dance studio. The public laundry that had served the Holborn and Covent Garden area for decades was shut down.

Following complaints from users about the deterioration of the building fabric, the Oasis was refurbished again at the end of the 2000s.
