= Women's Hospital Corps =

British medical unit during World War I

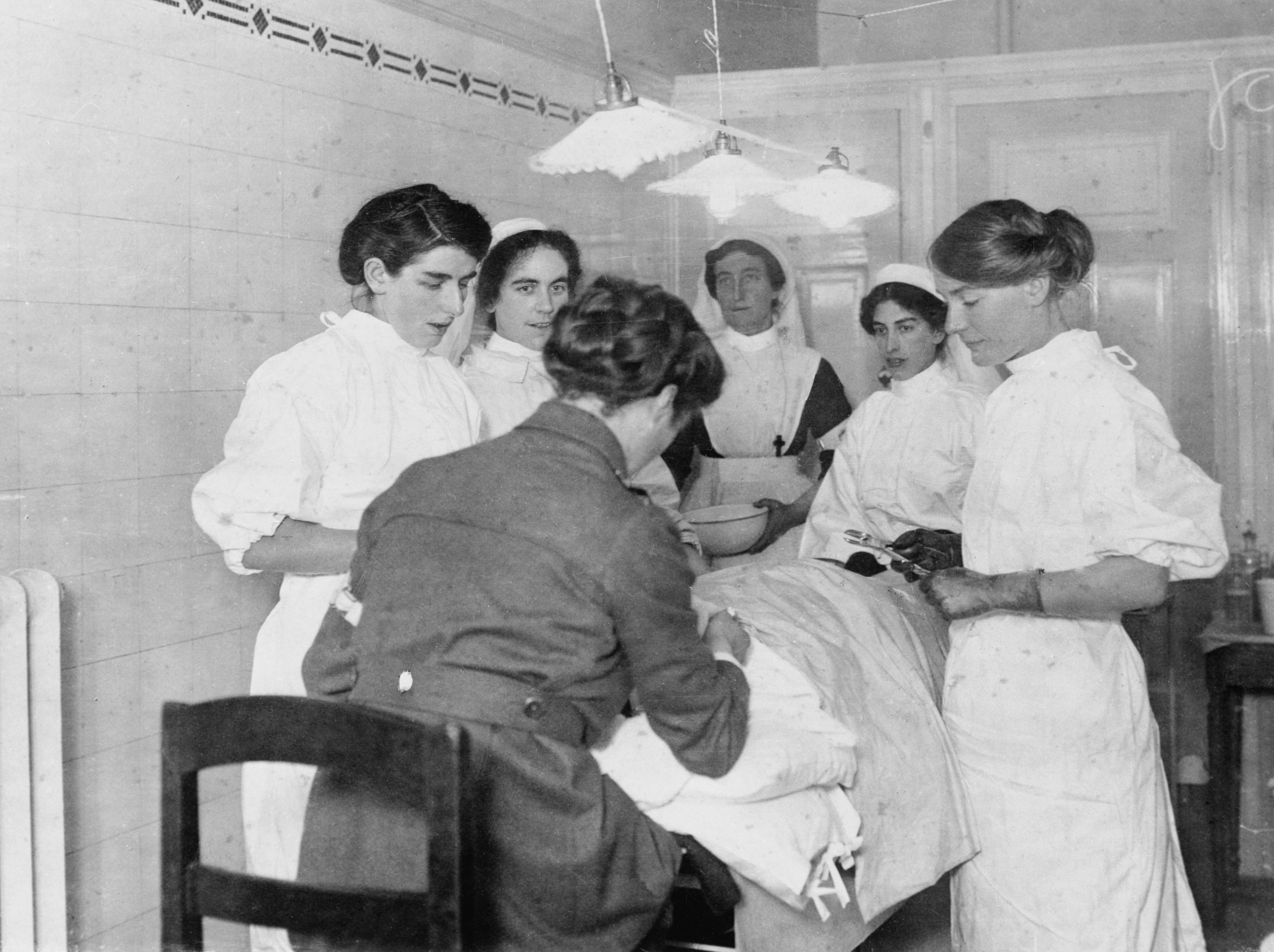
An operating room staffed by the Women's Hospital Corps in Paris, October 1914

The Women's Hospital Corps (WHC) was a military unit of the Royal Army Medical Corps (RAMC) during the World War I. It was formed by British women medics under the leadership of Louisa Garrett Anderson and Flora Murray, two outspoken suffragettes.

== Medical facilities of the WHC ==
Garrett Anderson and her partner Murray approached the French embassy in London in August 1914 with the plan to set up a medical centre in France to care for wounded soldiers, in addition to the official British military hospital in Versailles. The British military had rejected the use of women as military doctors.

=== Auxiliary hospitals in Paris and Wimereux ===
The British female doctors and nurses of the WHC established and ran two field hospitals in France from mid-September 1914 to February 1915, the Hôpital Auxiliaire in the Hôtel Claridge on Paris's Avenue des Champs-Élysées with around 100 beds and soon afterwards, due to the large number of wounded at Boulogne-sur-Mer, another at the Château Mauricien in Wimereux.

The Paris hospital received the first wounded on 16 September 1914 and was initially only supported by private donations and the French Red Cross.

=== Endell Street Military Hospital ===
The performance of the WHC was quickly recognised. As early as 18 February 1915, Garrett Anderson and Murray had the support of Sir Alfred Keogh in his capacity as Director-General Army Medical Services and were commissioned by the Ministry of Defence to build and run a military hospital in a poorhouse in St Giles' Church Parish in Endell Street, Covent Garden. Keogh's decision was not shared by many members of the British Military Medical Corps, who predicted the closure of the military hospital within six months.

The military hospital, run by Garrett Anderson and unusually for the time run entirely by women, had a capacity of 573 beds and cared for around 26,000 patients during its existence from May 1915 to December 1919, including 24,000 war wounded. In total, more than 7,000 operations were performed at the Endell Street Military Hospital. The hospital was later demolished and a residential building now stands on the same site.

== Other notable WHC members ==
In addition to the two medical leaders and activists of the Women's Social and Political Union Louisa Garrett Anderson and Flora Murray, other notable members of the early days included the physicians Grace Judge, Hazel Cuthbert and Gertrude Gazdar, as well as Majorie Blandy and Rosalie Jobson, who joined in Paris in September 1914. Olga Campbell, Mardie Hodgson and another nurse were in charge of the nursing service.

=== Grace Judge ===
Charlotte Grace Judge (born 14 February 1882 in Wynberg) was a British doctor born in South Africa. She was the daughter of the former Civil Commissioner of Kimberley Edward Arthur Judge]] and his wife Alice Elizabeth, née Shepstone, and had six siblings. She moved with her parents to the London Borough of Clapham in 1891 and studied in London, probably graduating as a Doctor of Medicine in mid-1913.

=== Hazel Cuthbert ===
Hazel Haward Chodak-Gregory, née Cuthbert (20 July 1886-12 January 1952), was a British paediatrician.

She was the daughter of architect Goymore Cuthbert and his wife Marion, née Linford. With the financial support of her uncle, she studied human medicine in London, graduating with a Bachelor of Medicine in 1911 and a Doctor of Medicine in 1913. During her deployment in Paris with the WHC, she was also deployed as a doctor on the motorised ambulances that rescued the wounded from the combat zone.

In 1916, she married the physician Alexis Chodak-Gregory. The marriage produced one son. After her war service, she worked at the Birmingham Children's Hospital and from 1919 at the Royal Free Hospital in London. She then worked as a junior doctor at the Queen Elizabeth Hospital for Children and in 1926 decided to specialise in paediatrics. She was Chair of the Medical Committee and Vice Principal of the London School of Medicine for Women. She was forced to retire in 1946 for health reasons.

=== Rosalie Jobson ===
Rosalie Jobson (1886–1963) was a British doctor and military physician born in Scotland. She was the daughter of the later Brigadier W. Jobson. She studied medicine at Oxford University and successfully graduated in 1914 with membership of the Royal College of Surgeons of England (MRCS) and a licence from the Royal College of Physicians (LRCP). She joined the WHC in Paris in September 1914 together with Majorie Blandy. She also explored the military hospital in Wimereux with her in 1914.

She first met her future husband, the neurologist Sir Gordon Morgan Holmes, during her field service in Paris. She later had three children with him named Kathleen, Rosalie and Elizabeth. In the literature about her husband, Jobson is also mentioned as an internationally active sportswoman.

=== Majorie Blandy ===
Majorie Blandy (1887–1937) was a British doctor. She was the first female medical registrar at London's National Hospital for Neurology and Neurosurgery in Queen Square. She joined the WHC in Paris with Rosalie Jobson and explored the military hospital at Wimereux with her in September 1914.

In 1922 she married the Irish neurologist James Purdon Martin. The marriage was initially kept secret, as married women had to give up their professional occupations at the time.
