= Mary Alice Blair =

New Zealand anaesthetist and WWI unit head (1880–1962)

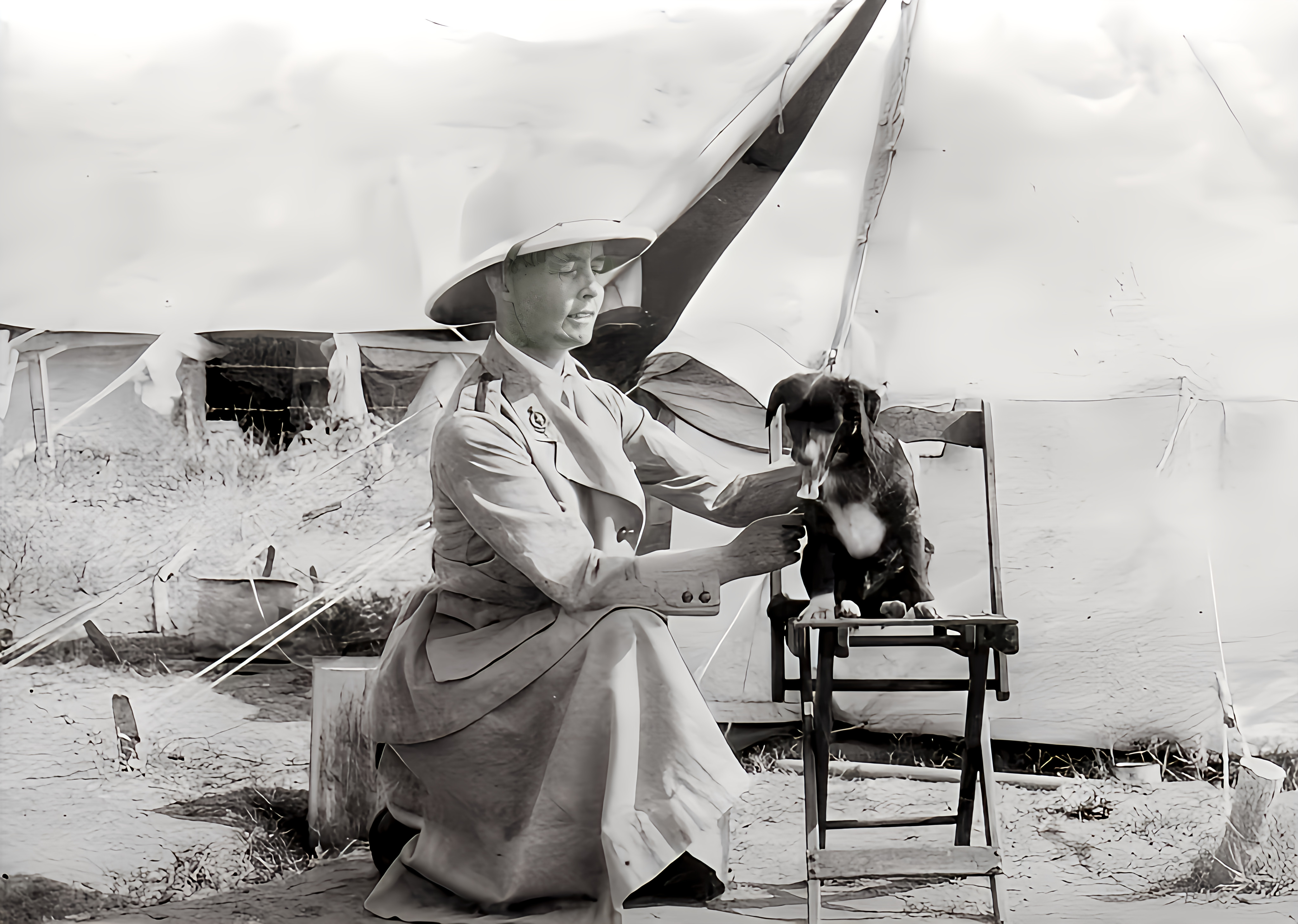
- Born: 27 February 1880; Dunedin, New Zealand
- Died: 1962 (aged 81–82)
- Education: Wellington Girls' College; Canterbury College; Victoria University of Wellington; Auckland University College; University of London; London School of Medicine for Women
- Known for: Doctor with the Scottish Women's Hospital for Foreign Service
- Medical career
- Profession: Anaesthetist, surgeon
- Institutions: British Hospital for Mothers and Babies; Royal Free Hospital; New Hospital for Women; Queen Mary's Army Auxiliary Corps Hospital, London; Whitelands College

Mary Alice Blair (1880–1962) was a New Zealand doctor who organised hospitals in Malta, Serbia and Salonika during the First World War. She was in charge of Serbian hospital evacuation to Corsica where she was responsible for the thousands of refugees. She was awarded the Serbian Medal of St Sava and mentioned in despatches for her distinguished service. An anaesthetist, trained in New Zealand and Britain, Blair was described as one of "the great women of anaesthesia."

== Birth and education ==
Mary Alice Blair was born on 27 February 1880 in Dunedin, New Zealand.

Blair's father, William, was an engineer in charge of the Public Works Department of the "Middle Island".

She was schooled at Wellington Girls' College; an almost exact contemporary student was author Katherine Mansfield. Blair then enrolled for a science course for a BSc at Canterbury College and (after a period at Victoria University College), finally completed the degree in 1902 at Auckland University College.

== London-pre war ==
Blair moved to London and passed the Intermediate examination of the University of London (1904). Then an MB BS (1907) and medical doctor's degree followed (1910) whilst house surgeon at the London School of Medicine for Women. In 1907 her name appeared in the medical directory for Scotland.

Blair was in private practice in London during this time in the wealthy London areas of Kensington and Westminster, although she also devoted some time as Honorary Anaesthetist in the poorer area of Plaistow, where she was one of those working in the Canning Town Docklands Settlements.

The long entry on Blair in the 1914 Medical Directory lists in abbreviated form numerous positions that she was holding simultaneously. She lived in Campden Hill, Kensington.

Her roles included Medical Advisor and Lecturer British Hospital for Mothers and Babies at Woolwich, House Surgeon and Senior Obstetrician Assistant in the Royal Free Hospital London, in addition to her Resident position as Medical Officer in the Maternity Department in London's New Hospital for Women.

== World War One ==
In World War One, Blair first worked in a hospital in France in early 1915. By the end of August, she was headed for Serbia as the doctor in charge of a second Hospital Unit, under the auspices of the SWH. It was to augment a unit already stationed there under Dr Alice Hutchison.

Blair sent a cable back to the NUWSS in London, noting that she was in Salonica by the start of December, where she organised a hospital with 100 beds. However, due to evacuation of the Serb soldiers and civilians and foreign hospital staff, Blair, accompanied by two doctors and Sir Edward Boyle reviewed a number of other localities within Serbia where the patients might be tended. In Salonica, Blair's accommodation was a former harem.

== Corsica ==
However, it was finally decided that the hospital should instead be evacuated to Corsica, and an account of this challenging transfer of field hospital operations (written by Blair while en route to Corsica on board the Amazone ) was published in 'Common Cause' in January 1916. The letter includes graphic detail of some of the injuries which had been inflicted on fleeing civilians – e.g. a boy of three who had been "prodded" with a bayonet, which had left him with scars.

Blair, and her staff and the many patients whom she was in charge of, landed in Corsica on Christmas Day 1915. A baby born on the day of arrival was appropriately christened "Napoleon".

Blair wrote another letter published in "Common Cause" where she described it as the "dreariest Christmas" they had ever spent.

After some disagreement, the hospital was set up in the Villa Miot on the coast near Ajaccio. The 'Guardian' reported that the French government had put Blair in complete charge on Corsica.

Eva Shaw McLaren's book "A history of the Scottish Women's hospital" has a photograph of the hospital and noted that it was on two floors which both overlooked the bay. The first shipload of Serbian refugees numbered 300 people, and the second 500.

By May 1916, five thousand had arrive on the island to be cared for. Blair worked closely with the two representatives from the Serbian Relief Fund, under Sir Edward Boyle and his mother, the widow of the Conservative politician; also Sir Edward Boyle.

== Other overseas service ==
After serving in Corsica, Blair was contracted as a civilian surgeon with the RAMC in Malta from September 1916 and was paid 24 shillings (£2.,20) per day.

In 1918 she returned to Salonica, Blair was in charge of the RAMC 42nd General Hospital, and her service there was recognised by a Mention in Dispatches issued by General Milne.

She bought a puppy "Muggins", while in Salonika, and the dog would visit patients with her, appearing to show sympathy to them. Muggins was later brought to London where he accompanied Blair when she was giving medical lectures. The dog died in 1930. It can be seen with Dr Blair in this photograph taken while they were in Salonika during the war.

== Post war work ==
By 1919, Blair had returned to London where she given the post of Senior Medical Officer in Queen Mary's Army Auxiliary Corps Hospital, London. She also maintained a private practice in obstetrics and gynaecology.

The King of the Serbs, Croats and Slovenes, Alexander I, conferred the Order of St Sava in 1922 upon Blair; this was in recognition of her work with the Serbian Relief Fund.

Blair attended several civic events in London, such as a Reception for overseas visitors at the Lyceum Club in 1925, along with Madame Montessori, when New Zealand High Commissioner Sir James Parr welcomed several hundred expatriates at the Mayfair Hotel and another large Reception in 1929.

Blair attended the London Conference on maternity and child welfare in 1926. She was noted as being in charge of the Hammersmith Centre, and took part in a long and spirited discussion about whether such centres should be teaching "the ideal" or "the expedient" in terms of conception and birth control.

Her duties lecturing in teaching hospitals and elsewhere continued; it was on her return from giving a lecture outside London in 1930 that she found her dog dead.

Later in the year, Blair was invited to the Royal Garden Party at Buckingham Palace in the presence of the King and Queen, and King Faisal I of Iraq and many other distinguished guests.

== Visit to New Zealand ==
In 1932, Blair returned to New Zealand for a visit. The "Otaki Mail" newspaper devoted a column to describing her work in London and her activities whilst in New Zealand.It noted that she had recently been appointed to Whitelands, a training college for women teachers in London, based in the college's new building, which had been opened in the preceding year by Queen Mary.

In addition to detailing her medical posts, the article further notes that Blair was adviser to women in Westminster District Post Office, and a Civil Service examiner.

The Otaki Mail also stated that Blair intended to walk the 53 kilometre Milford Track, a scenic hiking trail with rainforests, mountains and glaciers as well as visiting friends during her stay.

An afternoon tea in her honour was hosted by Lady Ferguson, and Blair attended an event by the University Women's Club in Wellington, where she gave a talk about her work in London and during World War One, including her experiences with the "mine-infested" Mediterranean.

== Return to London ==
Blair returned immediately to work the next day after her long trip back from New Zealand.

While in New Zealand, Blair had become concerned at the manner in which cattle were slaughtered, and on her return to London, she initiated a campaign for more humane methods to be used. She was supported by Sir George Barrow GCB and Sir Cecil Fforde, with the co-operation and support of the Council of Justice to animals and the Humane Slaughter Association.

Dr Platts-Mills from Wellington was Blair's guest at the latter's London home in Belgrave Road, Pimlico in 1933. Dr Platts-Mills was reported to be in London for two years to undertake post-graduate work. Adah Platts-Mills was the daughter of the first New Zealand woman doctor in private practice Daisy Platts-Mills.

Grosvenor House was the venue for a 1933 social event organised by the New Zealand Women's Association; this was attended by 200 women including Dr Blair.

The 1936 British Medical Journal noted that its Council had appointed Blair as one of its representatives to the Central College of District Nursing in London.

Two years later, it reported that she advocated that general practitioners should make regular visits to hospital to keep up to date; this was during a discussion following a lecture on preventive treatment and the GP.

Blair was 81 when she died in 1962, and is one of the "great women of anaesthesia" acknowledged by the Geoffrey Kaye Museum.

== See also ==
- Other notable women volunteers in the Scottish Women's Hospitals for Foreign Service
- Women in World War I
- The Serbian campaign (1914-1915)
