= South London Hospital for Women and Children =

- Wandsworth District Health Authority
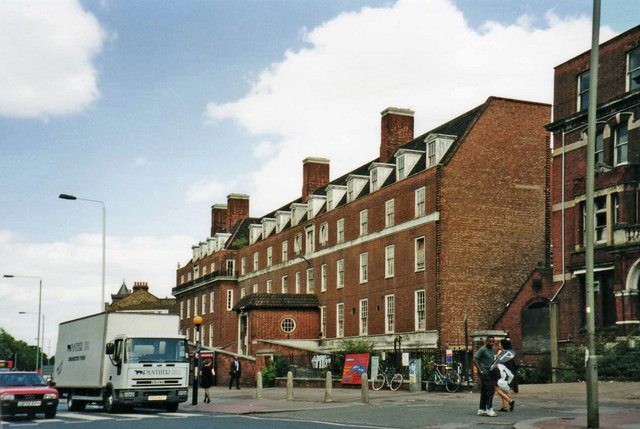
- The 1929 front building as it appeared in 1999

- Location within Lambeth

Geography
- Location: Clapham Common, London, England, United Kingdom
- Coordinates: 51°27′11″N 0°8′49″W

History
- Founded: 1912
- Closed: 1984

Links
- Lists: Hospitals in England

The South London Hospital for Women and Children was a general hospital treating women and children on Clapham Common in London, UK. It was also known as the South London Hospital for Women and the South London Women's Hospital. Founded by Eleanor Davies-Colley and Maud Chadburn in 1912, it always employed an all-woman staff. It closed in 1984.

== Foundation ==
Eleanor Davies-Colley and Maud Chadburn, two surgeons at the New Hospital for Women (later the Elizabeth Garrett Anderson Hospital, now the Elizabeth Garrett Anderson and Obstetric Hospital), began raising funds in 1911 for a new South London general hospital for women and children, with the aim of employing an all-woman medical staff. The New Hospital (the first hospital to be run along these lines) was increasingly unable to cope with the demand for its services, and many women were being turned away untreated. At that time, such hospitals served the dual purpose of improving medical care for women and enhancing career prospects for female medical practitioners, as many hospitals refused to employ women. Since the foundation of the New Hospital in 1872, the rationale for women-only hospitals had evolved from protecting feminine modesty to providing treatment choices for women, reflecting the growth of feminism during this period.

Aided by Davies-Colley's cousin Harriet Weaver, publisher of The Freewoman, and other feminists, enough money was raised to open an outpatients' department in Newington Causeway in 1912. A caustic letter to The Times from a medical practitioner who declared the project to be unnecessary, as any demand for women to treat women was an artificial result of women forcing themselves into medicine, seems to have sparked the major donation: £53,000 for building plus a £40,000 endowment. With such generous funding, progress was swift: a purpose-built eighty-bed hospital on Clapham Common, designed by architect Marcus Evelyn Collins, was opened by Queen Mary on 4 July 1916. Staffed entirely by women, it was the ninth general women's hospital in Britain to be run in this way, and the largest, thanks to the size of its endowment. Weaver became their first Honorary Secretary.

The South London Hospital included not only charity wards where patients paid only what they could afford, but also private rooms for which patients paid a set fee of 1–3 guineas per week. This reflected a trend in the later wave of women's hospitals (founded after the 1890s) towards treating a broader range of women, including the growing middle classes. The terms of the endowment strictly required that the hospital should employ only female doctors and admit only women, with the exception of children under seven. In fact, according to Chadburn's unpublished memoirs, the hospital's first inpatient only just qualified, being a boy of almost seven who had been injured in an accident involving a laundry van (cited by Elston).

== Interwar years and the Second World War ==
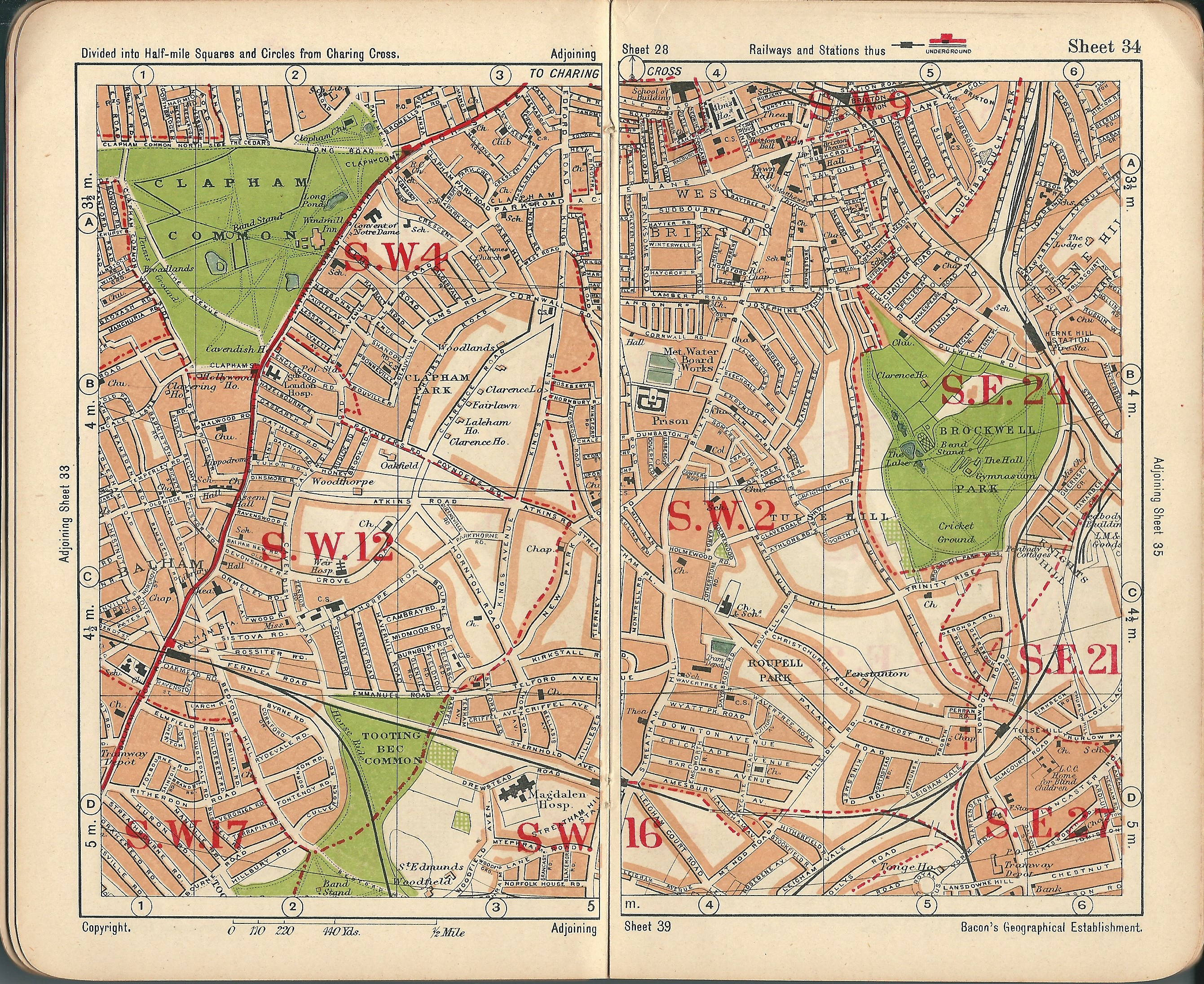
Extent/map context in 1921. Click for broader map and to enable varied magnification.

After the First World War, the hospital expanded, with new departments being added for dermatology (1922) and urology (1924).

The buildings were enlarged when the imposing Wrenaissance Baroque style frontage building (designed by leading 20th-century architect Sir Edwin Cooper – architect of the Port of London HQ opposite the Tower of London and another grand hospital building in Greenwich which is of a very similar style) was opened in 1929. Only 3/4 of this building was completed leaving the southern end pavilion missing; an unsightly gap for the rest of the century. Further extensions were completed in the 1950s. By the 1930s, however, the need for wholly female-staffed hospitals to provide positions for women had reduced greatly, as equality of career opportunities for women in mainstream, mixed-staffed hospitals started to emerge, and the future of such hospitals began to be called into question. Although several women-only hospitals began to admit men during the 1930s, the South London Hospital's fundraising was sufficiently effective to allow it retain its original staffing policy. In 1933 the 23 year old Angela Murray became the chair of the board and four years later a south wing was added. After the Second World War broke out the hospital was required to treat soldiers but they could not be initially admitted. The terms of its founding donation were so strict that an Act of Parliament was required for male soldiers to be treated. Spaces that had been waiting areas were converted into wards and operating theatres to deal with the casualties.

== National Health Service and closure ==
When the National Health Service (NHS) took over hospital provision in 1948, hospital care became free at point of use and remaining restrictions on hospital appointments by gender in mainstream hospitals were formally removed. These changes obviously had an enormous impact on the need both for women-only hospitals and for the provision of charitable care. The South London Hospital, like most other women-only hospitals, was absorbed into the NHS. Although the NHS legislation did include some provision for maintaining the objects of the original institutions, where practical, the new regionally based administration made this problematic. Many women-only hospitals were closed, merged with other mixed hospitals, or required to admit male staff. The South London Hospital escaped these fates for more than three decades. In 1982, 3674 and 1953 new outpatients, respectively, attended the departments of gynaecological and genitourinary medicine.

The women-only staffing policy was retained until the hospital's closure, when it was one of the very few general hospital in Britain to remain wholly staffed by women. It fostered what three employees described in 1984 as 'that unique liaison and co-operation that is so striking a feature of the hospital.' The all-women wards served by an entirely female nursing and consultant staff also seem to have been popular with the public; a petition protesting against closure was signed by 60,000 people, and the hospital building was occupied for nine months by protesters.

The South London Hospital was closed in 1984, deemed uneconomic by Wandsworth Area Health Authority, a claim disputed by three employees in a letter to the British Medical Journal. A "work in" was organised in 1984 and the buildings were occupied by protestors until 27 March 1985.

== Redevelopment ==
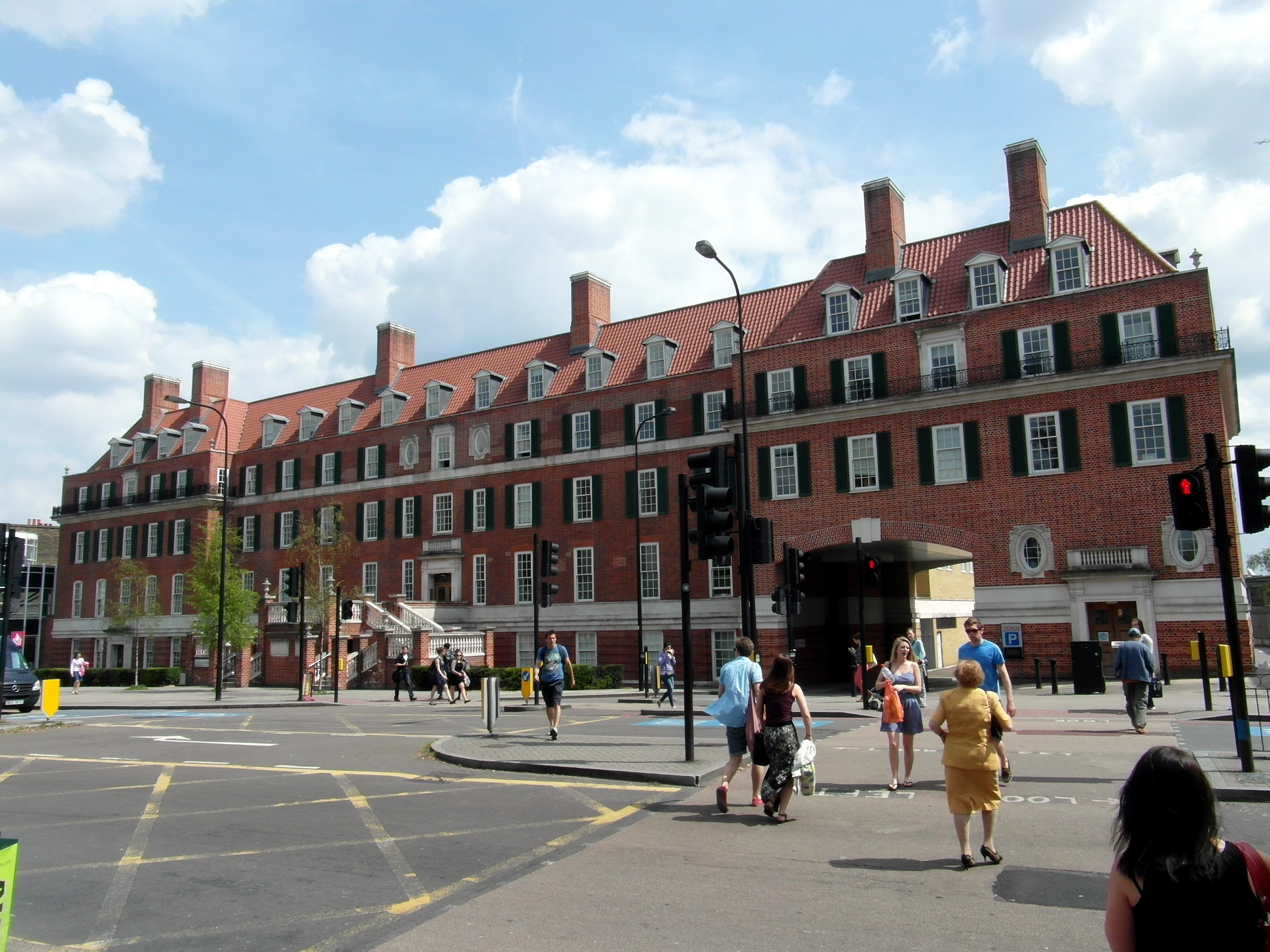
Hospital building after renovation, including new pavilion.

The original hospital building was by leading architect Sir Edwin Cooper, and has been described as a 'most impressive landmark building and a good example of neo-classical 1920s architecture'.

In 1998 Tesco attempted to win permission to demolish the hospital to the ground and replace it with a tower block of flats and a new store but this was strongly contested by Lambeth Council, local residents and amenity groups at a major public inquiry. Lambeth and the Clapham residents won their fight and Tesco agreed to retain Cooper's frontage of 1929. In 2004 the Cooper building was refurbished and the missing pavilion was finally completed, 75 years after the original building was opened. This, and the removal of the awkward ambulance entrance ramp and clumsy porch, which was replaced by an elegant flight of steps with classical balustrade designed by leading conservation architect Giles Quarme, improved the appearance of this landmark. English Heritage refused to list the building so Lambeth was unable to save the interiors including an Elizabethan style wooden staircase, fine panelled Board Room and the Outpatients waiting hall with chequer-board floor and barrel vaulted ceiling which were all destroyed. The frontage block was converted into flats above a Tesco supermarket and the ward blocks behind were all demolished to build a new block of flats with large car park for Tesco.

== See also ==
- List of hospitals in England
