= Brackenbury =

Brackenbury is a surname. Notable people with the surname include:

- Alison Brackenbury, British poet
- Charles Booth Brackenbury (1831–1890), British major general and military correspondent (nephew of Edward Brackenbury)
- Charles Brackenbury (1907–1959), British racing driver
- Curt Brackenbury (born 1952), Canadian ice hockey player
- Edward Brackenbury (1785–1864), British soldier
- Georgina Brackenbury (1865–1949), British painter and suffragette (daughter of Charles Booth Brackenbury)
- Hannah Brackenbury (1795–1873), British philanthropist, benefactress of Balliol College, Oxford
- Henry Brackenbury (1837–1914), British soldier (brother of Charles Booth Brackenbury)
- Henry Langton Brackenbury (1868–1920), British politician
- Ian Brackenbury (born 1945), Royal Air Force officer
- Joseph Brackenbury (1788–1864), English poet
- Marie Brackenbury (1866–1950), British painter and suffragette (daughter of Charles Booth Brackenbury)
- Robert Brackenbury (died 1485), English courtier and soldier
- Sammy Thurman Brackenbury (1933–2024), American hall of fame barrel racer

== See also ==
- Brackenbury Village, a residential district of west London.
- Lord Brackenbury, a novel by Amelia Edwards
- The Brackenbury Scholarship to Balliol College, Oxford
