= Flora Shaw, Baroness Lugard =

British journalist and writer (1852–1929)

The Right Honourable The Lady Lugard DBE
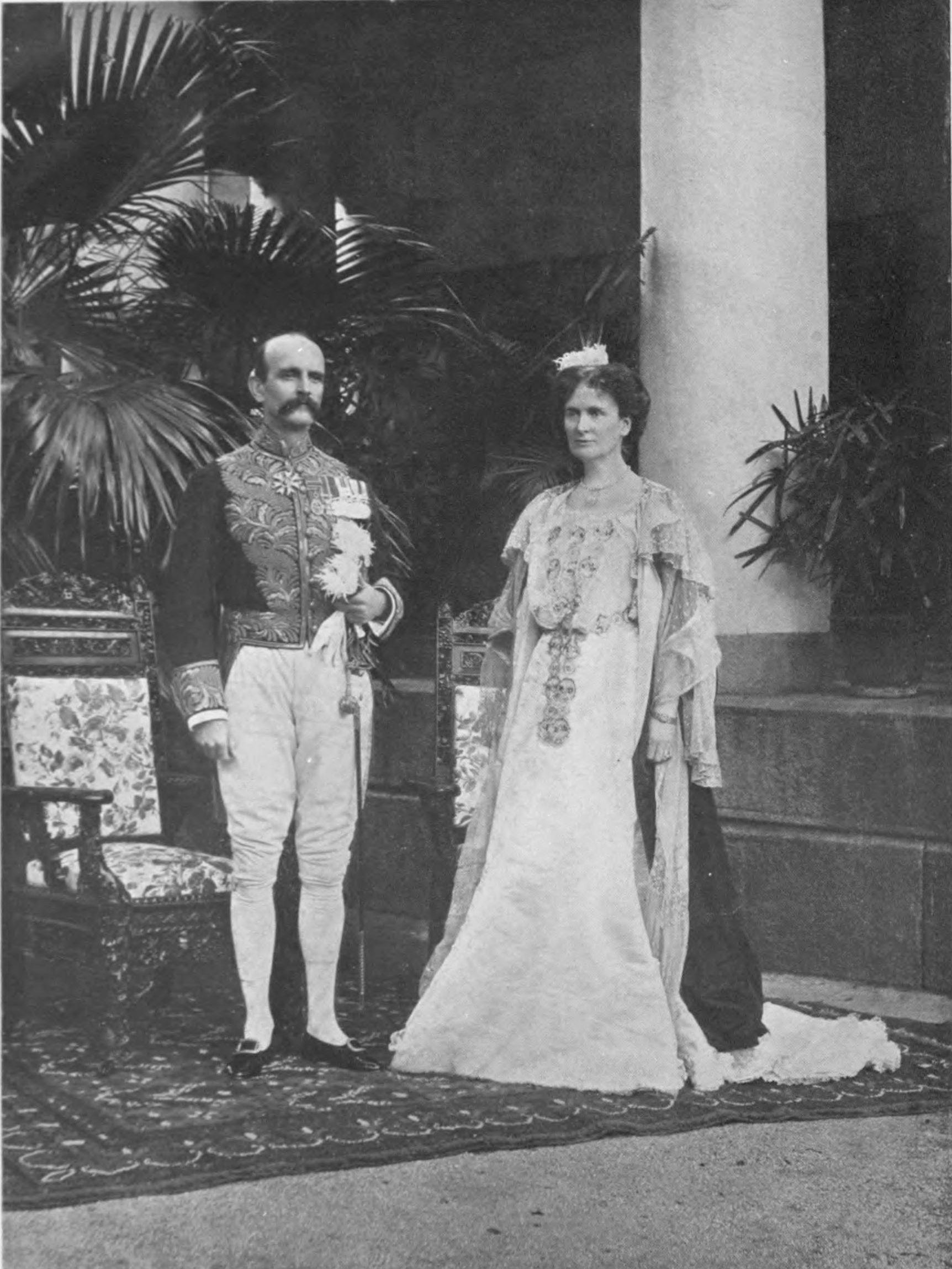
- Lord and Lady Lugard.

Spouse of the Governor of Hong Kong
- In office 29 July 1907 – 16 March 1912
- Governor: Sir Frederick Lugard
- Preceded by: Edith Blake
- Succeeded by: Helena May

Personal details
- Born: Flora Louise Shaw; 19 December 1852 Woolwich, England
- Died: 25 January 1929 (aged 76) Surrey, England
- Spouse: Frederick Lugard (m. 1902)
- Occupation: Journalist, novelist

Flora Louise Shaw, Baroness Lugard DBE (born 19 December 1852 – 25 January 1929), was a British journalist and writer. She is credited with having coined the name Nigeria.

== Early life ==
She was born at 2 Dundas Terrace, Woolwich, South London and was the fourth of fourteen children of Captain (later Major General) George Shaw, of the English Royal Artillery, and Marie Adrienne Josephine (née Desfontaines; 1826–1871), daughter of the French governor of Mauritius. She had nine sisters, the first and the last of whom died in infancy, and four brothers.

Her paternal grandfather was Sir Frederick Shaw. He was third baronet (1799–1876), of Bushy Park, Dublin and a member of parliament from 1830 to 1848, regarded as the leader of the Irish Conservatives. Her paternal grandmother, Thomasine Emily, was the sixth daughter of the Hon. George Jocelyn, and granddaughter of Robert Jocelyn, first Earl of Roden.

From the age of twenty, Shaw was a housekeeper-governess to Georgina and Marie Brackenbury, children of Hilda and Charles Booth Brackenbury, to whom she was related by marriage.

== Writing for children ==
Shaw was mentored by John Ruskin, Slade professor at Oxford, from the age of seventeen and through him met Thomas Carlyle. From 1878 to 1886, Shaw wrote five novels, four for children and one for young adults. In her books, young girls are encouraged to be resourceful and brave but in a traditional framework, acting in support of "gentlemanly" fathers and prospective husbands, rather than on their own behalf. Shaw's writing has been interpreted by one academic as sexually conservative and imperialist. She also wrote a history of Australia for children.

Her first novel, Castle Blair, was translated into several languages and continued to be extremely popular in the UK and the U.S. well into the 20th century. It was based on her own Anglo-Irish childhood experiences. Charlotte Mary Yonge recommended it along with works of "some of the most respected and loved authors available in late Victorian England" as "wild ... attractive and exciting". The critic John Ruskin called Castle Blair "good, and lovely, and true".

== Journalism ==
Shaw first took advantage of a journalistic opportunity while she was staying with family friends in Gibraltar in 1886. Over four months, she visited Zebehr Pasha, a slaver and former governor of Sudan, who had been removed from office and was incarcerated there. Her reports purportedly led to his release.

Upon her return to England, she wrote for The Pall Mall Gazette and the The Manchester Guardian. She was sent by the latter to cover the Brussels Anti-Slavery Conference 1889–90, where she was the only woman reporter. She became Colonial Editor for The Times, which made her the highest paid woman journalist of the time. At The Times, she was sent as a special correspondent to Southern Africa in 1892; Australia in 1901; and New Zealand in 1892, partly to study the question of Kanaka labour in the sugar plantations of Queensland. Penneshaw, South Australia is partly named after her. She also made two journeys to Canada, in 1893 and 1898, the second including a journey to the gold diggings of Klondike.

Her belief in the positive benefits of the British Empire infused her writing. As a correspondent for The Times, Shaw sent back "Letters" in 1892 and 1893 from her travels in South Africa and Australia, later published in book form as Letters from South Africa (1893) and Letters from Queensland (1893). Writing for the educated governing circles, she focused on the prospects of economic growth and the political consolidation of self-governing colonies within an increasingly-united empire, with a vision largely blinkered to the force of colonial nationalisms and local self-identities.

The lengthy articles in a leading daily newspaper reveal a late-Victorian metropolitan imagery of colonial space and time. Shaw projected vast empty spaces awaiting energetic English settlers and economic enterprise. When she first started writing for The Times, she wrote under the name of "F. Shaw" to try to disguise that she was a woman. Later, she was so highly regarded that she wrote openly as Flora Shaw. Her pseudonym is now little-known, and she was regarded as one of the greatest journalists of her time, specialising in politics and economics.

Shaw was required to testify before the House of Commons Select Committee on British South Africa during the controversy on the Jameson Raid into the Transvaal on 29 December 1895. The prominent journalist had corresponded frequently with those involved or suspected of involvement, including Cecil Rhodes, Leander Starr Jameson, Colonel Francis Rhodes, and Colonial Secretary Joseph Chamberlain. She was exonerated from all charges.

=== Naming Nigeria ===
In an essay that first appeared in The Times on 8 January 1897, by "Miss Shaw", she suggested the name "Nigeria" for the British Protectorate on the Niger River. In her essay, Shaw made the case for a shorter term that would be used for the "agglomeration of pagan and Mahomedan States" to replace the official title, "Royal Niger Company Territories". She thought that the term "Royal Niger Company Territories" was too long to be used as a name of a real estate property, under the trading company in that part of Africa. She was in search of a new name, and she coined "Nigeria", in preference to terms such as "Central Sudan", which were associated with the area by some geographers and travellers.

She thought that the term "Sudan" was associated with a territory in the Nile basin. In The Times on 8 January 1897, she wrote: "The name Nigeria applying to no other part of Africa may without offence to any neighbours be accepted as co-extensive with the territories over which the Royal Niger Company has extended British influence, and may serve to differentiate them equally from the colonies of Lagos and the Niger Protectorate on the coast and from the French territories of the Upper Niger." (Upper Senegal and Niger and the Colony of Niger).

== The Lady Lugard ==
She was close to the three men who most epitomised the British Empire in Africa: Cecil Rhodes, George Taubman Goldie and Sir Frederick Lugard. On 10 June 1902, she married Lugard. She accompanied him when he served as Governor of Hong Kong (1907–1912) and Governor-General of Nigeria (1914–1919). In 1928, her husband was elevated to the peerage as Baron Lugard, and thus she became "The Lady Lugard". They had no children.

While they lived in Hong Kong, she helped her husband establish the University of Hong Kong. During the First World War, she was prominent in the founding of the War Refugees Committee, which dealt with the problem of the refugees from Belgium, and she founded the Lady Lugard Hospitality Committee. In the 1918 New Year Honours, she was appointed as a Dame Commander of the Order of the British Empire. She died of pneumonia on 25 January 1929, aged 76, in Surrey.

== Legacy ==
In her obituary, The Times foreign editor described her as “the finest flower of modern womanhood, a womanly woman, who at the same time possessed the reasoning capacity of a man”. Her biography was written in 1947 by Enid Moberly Bell, daughter of and assistant to Charles Frederic Moberly Bell, managing director of The Times.

In 2019, in the wake of the Rhodes Must Fall campaign, The Times published an essay "How The Times helped Cecil Rhodes in his conquest of Africa" by columnist Ben Macintyre, reckoning with Shaw's role in Britain's colonial history. The essay concluded: "... Flora must not fall. Instead, she should stay right where she is, but with a new plaque attached: 'Flora Shaw, 1852–1929; pioneer journalist, fanatical imperialist, passionate, principled and wrong.'"

== Works ==
In 1905, Shaw wrote what remains the definitive history of western Sudan and the modern settlement of Northern Nigeria, A Tropical Dependency: An Outline of the Ancient History of the Western Soudan, With an Account of the Modern Settlement of Northern Nigeria.

- Castle Blair: A story of youthful days (First published London, 1877)
- Hector, a story (First serialized in Aunt Judy's Magazine, 1880–1881)
- Phyllis Browne (First serialized in Aunt Judy's Magazine, 1881–1882)
- A Sea Change (First published London, 1885)
- Colonel Cheswick's Campaign (Boston, 1886).
- The story of Australia (London: Horace Marshall, 1897), as part of the Story of the Empire series.
- Letters from Queensland/ by the Times special correspondent (London, 1893)
