= SS Royal William =

Canadian side-wheel paddle steamship

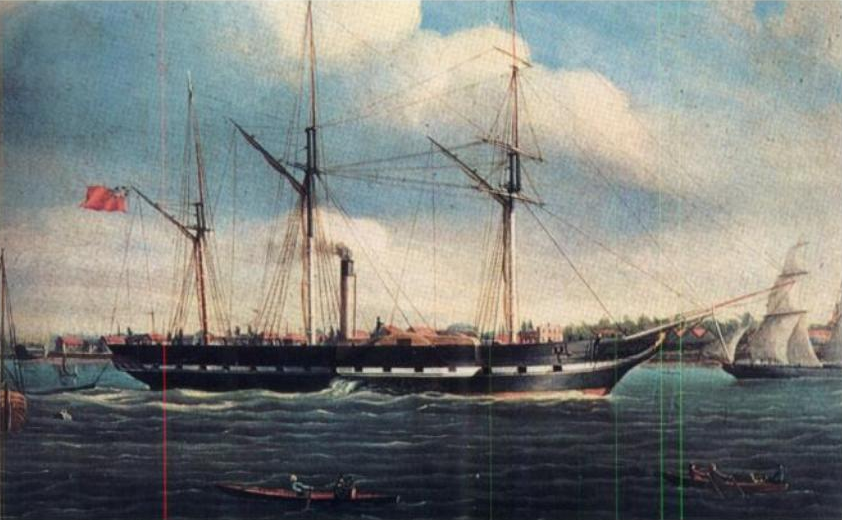
- A painting of the SS Royal William

History
- Name: SS Royal William
- Ordered: 1830
- Builder: George Black and John Saxton Campbell, Quebec
- Laid down: September 2, 1830
- Launched: April 27, 1831
- In service: August 24, 1831

Spain
- Name: Isabel II
- Namesake: Isabella II
- Acquired: September 1834
- Out of service: 6 January 1860
- Renamed: 1850: Santa Isabel
- Refit: 1840
- Fate: Sunk by storm in Algeciras bay, 8 January 1860

General characteristics
- Tonnage: 1,370 ton
- Length: 160 ft (49 m)
- Beam: 44 ft (13 m)
- Propulsion: steam engine; paddles

SS Royal William was a Canadian side-wheel paddle steamship that is sometimes credited with the first crossing of the Atlantic Ocean almost entirely under steam power, in 1833. She was the largest passenger ship in the world from 1831 to 1839, where it was then passed by the SS Great Western. Earlier vessels that crossed partially under steam include the British-built Dutch-owned Curaçao in 1827 and the sail-steam hybrid SS Savannah in 1819.

The 1,370-ton SS Royal William (named after the ruling monarch, William IV) was 160 feet (49 m) long, of 44 feet (13 m) breadth and had a draught of 17¾ft, a large steamship for the time. She was designed by 21-year old James Goudie, who had served his apprenticeship, likely at Scotts Shipbuilding and Engineering Company of Greenock, Scotland, a seaport on the Firth of Clyde.

== History ==
=== Genesis ===
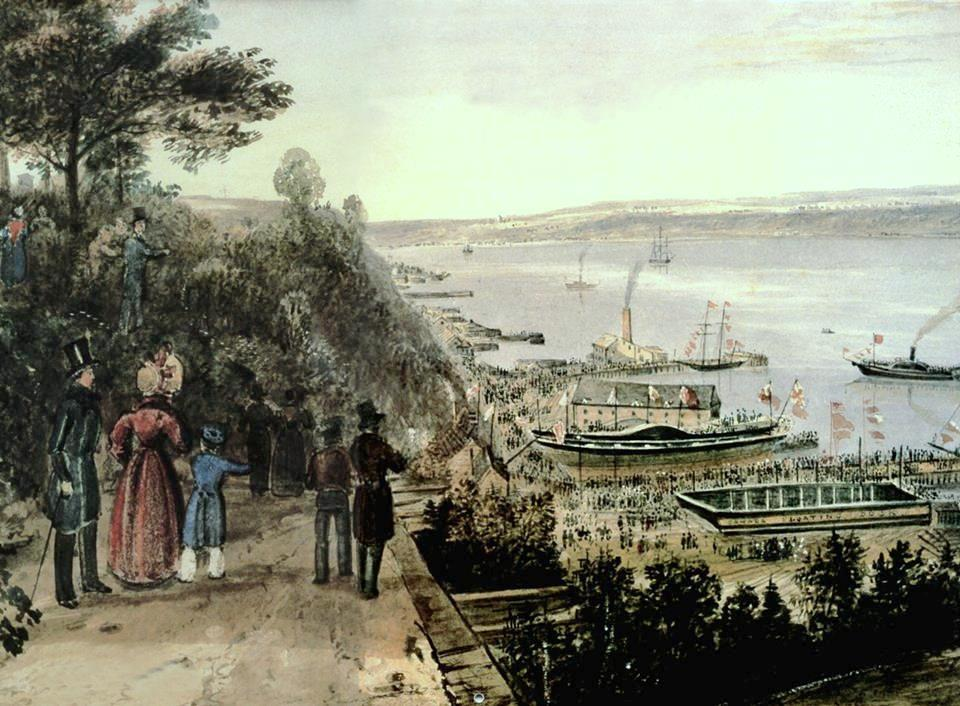
Royal William, Quebec City, 1831

She was commissioned by brewer John Molson, George Black, John Saxton Campbell, and a group of investors from various colonies in British North America, including a group in Halifax, Nova Scotia, who subscribed 196 shares at £25. There were all told 235 investors, who put a total of £16,000 in the Quebec and Halifax Steam Navigation Company. The incorporation occurred on 31 March 1830.

=== Construction ===
The ship was built in Cape Blanc, Quebec by John Saxton Campbell and George Black, who laid its keel on 2 September 1830. She was launched on 27 April 1831 by Lady and Lord Aylmer at Cape Cove, Quebec. Her steam engines were manufactured and installed in Montreal, at the premises of the Bennet and Henderson Foundry, near the foot of St. Mary's current. On 13 August 1831, she made her shakedown voyage under steam from there to Quebec (calling at Sorel and Three Rivers en route). She was officially registered on 22 August.

=== Career as mail packeteer ===
She made several trips between Quebec and the Atlantic colonies in 1831, but travel became restricted because of the cholera epidemic in 1832. Some shareowners protested that she had been poorly maintained over the winter, and that as a result costly repairs were required that should have been unnecessary. One legislator suggested that the annual subsidy not be paid because Royal William had not fulfilled her schedule. The losses bankrupted the venture because the loans went unpaid. The owners lost some £16,000 on the venture. On 3 April 1833, she was purchased at auction by a half-dozen mortgage holders and original shareholders for £5,000.

=== Historic Crossing ===
Her new owners decided to sail her to Europe and find a buyer. She departed from Pictou, Nova Scotia on 18 August 1833 with seven passengers, a small amount of freight and a large load of coal and arrived at Gravesend on the River Thames after a 25-day passage that included a stop at the Cowes, Isle of Wight for a fresh coat of paint. Her engines had run reliably for the entire voyage. Aside from a one-day pause to clean her boilers, the ship had crossed non-stop using its steam engines. Earlier steamships had crossed the Atlantic such the Curaçao in 1827 and the American SS Savannah in 1819 but had mainly used sail power to make their voyages.

=== Sale in England ===
Royal William, which initially sold for £10,000, was eventually sold to the Spanish Navy which renamed her Isabel Segunda (after Queen Isabella II. She served for many years and earned the distinction of being the first steam warship to fire in anger, at Zarauz on 14 April 1839 during the First Carlist War.

On 8 January 1860, Isabel Segunda was driven ashore and wrecked at Algeciras.

== Legacy ==
One of Royal William's co-owners was Halifax merchant Samuel Cunard, who drew important lessons from the ship which he applied when he founded the Cunard Steamship Company a few years later.

In the town of Pictou, there is a Royal Canadian Sea Cadet Corps named after this vessel. A large wooden model of Royal William is on display at the Maritime Museum of the Atlantic in Halifax.
