= Archibald Campbell (notary) =

Canadian notary and seigneur (1790–1862)

Archibald Campbell (June 29, 1790 – July 16, 1862) was a seigneur and notary in Lower Canada.

Campbell was born in the town of Quebec in 1790, the son of merchant Archibald Campbell. He studied law with Jacques Voyer, qualified to practice as a notary in 1812 and set up practice at Quebec. He joined the local militia during the War of 1812. In 1817, Campbell married Agnes George. In 1821, he was named a King's Notary. The historian François-Xavier Garneau trained as a notary with Campbell and, during that time, took advantage of his extensive library. In 1822, Campbell purchased the seigneury of Le Bic. He helped found the Literary and Historical Society of Quebec.

Campbell died at Le Bic in 1862.

== Family ==
Campbell's older brother John was a seigneur and merchant. His sister Louisa Sophia married seigneur Jonathan Würtele. His sister Harriet Sheppard married lumber merchant William Sheppard and became a noted botanist and ornithologist in Quebec.

Campbell's daughter Charlotte Saxton married Lower Canada physician George Mellis Douglas, and among their children were Campbell Douglas VC and Admiral Archibald Douglas.

His son William Darling Campbell inherited the seigneury of Le Bic and served on the municipal council for Quebec City. His youngest daughter Hilda Eliza married an English army officer, Charles Booth Brackenbury, and became a British suffragette after his death, along with her daughters, Georgina and Marie Brackenbury.
