= Brockenbrough =

Brockenbrough is a surname. Notable people with the surname include:

- John Brockenbrough (1775–1852), business man and civic leader in Richmond, Virginia
- John M. Brockenbrough (1830–1892), farmer and a Confederate colonel in the American Civil War
- John White Brockenbrough (1806–1877), Virginia lawyer, federal judge, and educator
- Judith Brockenbrough (1784–1854), intimate of Dolley Madison, wife of U.S. President James Madison
- Martha Brockenbrough, American author of fiction and nonfiction for children and adults
- William Brockenbrough (jurist) (1778–1838), born in Tappahannock in Essex County, Virginia, USA
- William Henry Brockenbrough (1812–1850), US Representative from Florida

== See also ==
- Brockenbrough House, historic site in Tappahannock, Essex County, Virginia
- John Brockenbrough Newton (1839–1897), bishop coadjutor of Virginia
- Brackenber
- Brackenbury
- Brokenborough
- Brückenberg
