= John Saxton Campbell =

Canadian businessman (1787–1855)

John Saxton Campbell (c. 1787 – April 25, 1855) was a seigneur and businessman in Lower Canada.

== Life ==
He was the son of Archibald Campbell and Charlotte Saxton and the brother of botanist Harriet Sheppard and notary Archibald Campbell. He is believed to have come to the town of Quebec at a young age; his father was involved in the timber trade and came to Quebec after the American Revolutionary War.

Campbell took over the operation of his father's business in 1811 and later partnered in the timber business with William Sheppard, who had married his sister Harriet. In 1824 and 1825, Campbell managed sawmills for one John Caldwell. In 1825, he set up his own operation, with wharves, a sawmill, and a shipyard at Anse des Mères near Quebec. The steamer Royal William of Samuel Cunard's Quebec and Halifax Steam Navigation Company was built at Campbell's shipyard. He was also a business partner of shipbuilder George Black.

Campbell was a director of the Quebec Bank and the Quebec Savings Bank. He also helped found the Literary and Historical Society of Quebec. In 1835, he purchased the seigneury of Îlet-du-Portage.

Around 1842, Campbell and his wife moved to Penzance in England, where he died in 1855.

His sister Louisa Sophia married seigneur Jonathan Würtele.
