= Hilda Brackenbury =

British suffragette (1832–1918)

Hilda Eliza Brackenbury
- Born: 27 April 1832; Quebec
- Died: 31 October 1918 (aged 86); London, England
- Occupation: Activist (suffragette)
- Known for: Women's suffrage activism
- Parent(s): Archibald and Agnes Campbell
- Relatives: Georgina and Marie (children)

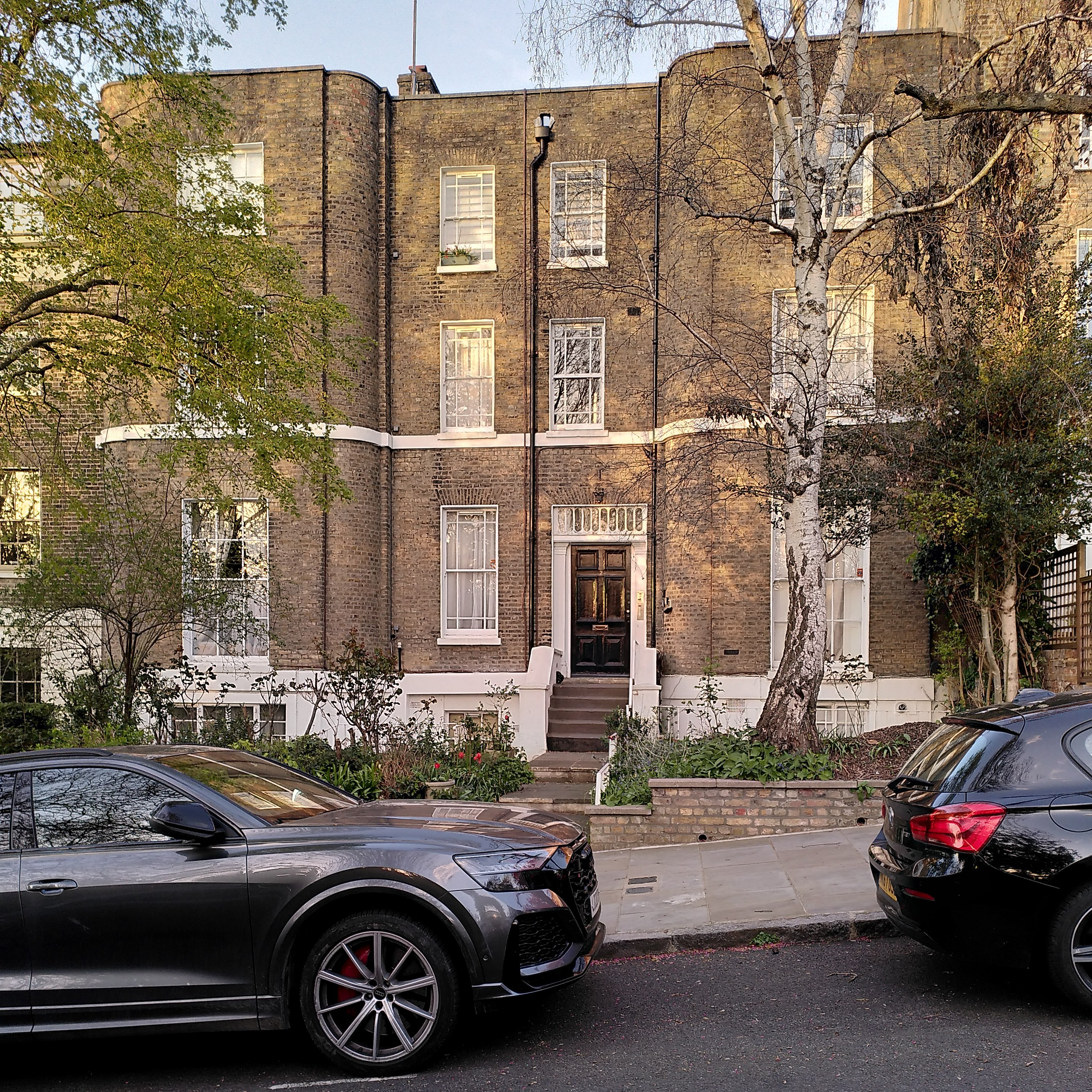
2 Campden Hill Square, Kensington, Brackenbury's London residence. It was nicknamed 'Mouse Castle'.

Hilda Eliza Brackenbury (born 27 April 1832 in Quebec; died 31 October 1918 in London) was a Canadian-born British suffragette and mother of fellow suffragettes, Georgina and Marie.

== Life ==
The youngest daughter of Archibald Campbell of Quebec, in April 1854, Hilda Eliza married Charles Booth Brackenbury. The pair had three daughters and six sons, but in 1870 their eldest daughter died, and in 1884 and 1885 their two eldest son passed away. In 1890, Charles died suddenly from heart failure, and a year later, couple's second eldest surviving son, Lionel, serving in the army, died in India. Hilda left London, and along with her children, Georgina, Marie and Hereward, she moved in with her siblings in law, Andrew and Margy Noble, to Newcastle upon Tyne. By 1899, Hilda and her two daughters returned to London, moving into 2 Campden Hill Square.

After the death of her husband, Hilda Eliza became interested in women's rights and in 1907 she joined the increasingly radical Women's Social and Political Union (WSPU). Quickly her daughters Georgina and Marie also joined the WSPU and they transformed their studios in Holland Park into classrooms where they could train women in public speaking. In 1908, Georgina and Marie were sentenced to six weeks in prison after they joined a WSPU stunt at the House of Commons.

On 18 November 1910, Hilda Brackenbury joined Louisa Anderson, Emmeline Pankhurst, Alfred Caldecott, Hertha Ayrton, Mrs Elmy, Princess Sophia Duleep Singh, and 300 other women to petition Prime Minister Asquith for voting rights. The protest became known as Black Friday, due to the violence and sexual assault the protesters faced from the police and male bystanders.

Christabel Pankhurst decided that the WSPU needed to intensify its window-breaking campaign. On 1 March 1912, a group of suffragettes volunteered to take action in the West End of London. As The Daily Graphic reported the next day: "The West End of London last night was the scene of an unexampled outrage on the part of militant suffragists.... Bands of women paraded Regent Street, Piccadilly, the Strand, Oxford Street and Bond Street, smashing windows with stones and hammers." Hilda was arrested for breaking windows in the United Service Institution in Whitehall. Her two daughters were also arrested. She made the point that two of her sons had been killed in India on active service whilst she had little political rights. She served eight days on remand and fourteen days in jail despite being almost 80 years old. Hilda was asked to talk at the London Pavilion upon her release in April 1912.

In 1913 the government passed the Prisoners (Temporary Discharge for Ill Health) Act which gave the authorities the power to release hunger-striking suffragettes and then rearrest them when they had recovered. It was known as the "Cat and Mouse Act" because cats are known for playing with mice before they kill them. Hilda's home at 2 Campden Hill Square was used as a convalescent home for recovering hunger strikers and was nicknamed "Mouse Castle".

In June 1914 Hilda wrote a letter to The Times about women's suffrage titled 'The women have died, but that did not stop militancy'. She named women who had died for the cause and those 'partially dead in body though not in spirit.' She claimed that thousands other women were left and ready to demolish 'pictures, churches, houses ...' while 'policemen cannot be everywhere.', and when the men were ready to protect their property, they would 'Let the women die by all means, but to save our young men from such a terrible sacrifice let justice be done, and give women the vote!'.
