= Marie Brackenbury =

British painter (1866–1950)

Marie V. C. Brackenbury
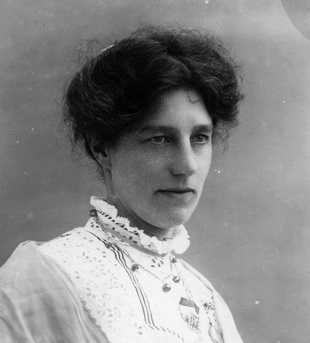
- Brackenbury in 1910
- Born: 1866
- Died: 1950 (aged 83–84)
- Education: Slade School of Art
- Occupations: Painter and activist
- Known for: Suffragette
- Parent(s): Hilda Eliza Brackenbury and Charles Booth Brackenbury

Marie Venetia Caroline Brackenbury (1866–1950) was a British painter who was a militant suffragette and suffragette artist. She was jailed for demonstrating for women's rights. She followed Emmeline Pankhurst's lead as she became more militant (and lost former colleagues). Her home was known as "Mouse Castle" because it looked after recovering hunger strikers. The house now has a plaque which remembers the trio of her sister, her mother and Maria. She was the younger sister of Georgina Brackenbury, also a painter and militant suffragette.

== Life ==
Brackenbury was born in 1866. Her father Major General Charles Booth Brackenbury was Director of the artillery college in Woolwich. Brackenbury's mother, Hilda Eliza, disliked housework, so she was brought up for a time by Flora Shaw, a relative who was governess housekeeper before going on to have a successful international career as a journalist and author. In 1890 the family moved to Kensington after the death of their father. Her parents both had artistic interests and Marie (and Georgina) went to the Slade School of Art where she specialised in landscapes.

Her mother had been interested in women's rights and in 1907 she joined the increasingly radical Women's Social and Political Union (WSPU). Maria and his sister also joined the WSPU. Marie said that she was impressed by the "womanliness" of Emmeline Pankhurst. They transformed their studios into classrooms where they would train women in public speaking and later for creating suffragette art. In 1908 she created a cartoon called "This is the House that Men Built". In 1911 they created a Joan of Arc costume for a demonstration. Marie was particularly known for pavement art where she would chalk pavements to advertise WSPU events.

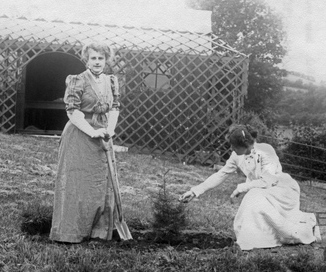
Marie and Georgina Brackenbury at the Suffragette's Rest in 1909

Georgina and Marie were sentenced to six weeks in prison after they joined a WSPU stunt at the House of Commons. This was the "pantechnicon raid" when a furniture van (pantechnicon) was used as a "Trojan Horse" to get twenty suffragettes to the House of Commons. When they were close the door opened and both Maria and Georgina joined the many who tried to rush their way into the lobby.

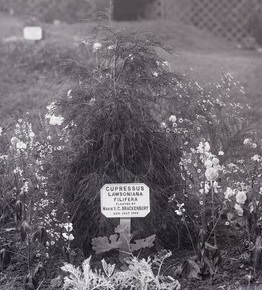
The plaque states "Planted by Marie V.C. Brackenbury 22nd July 1909"

Their imprisonment qualified both of them to have a commemorative tree planted at the "Suffragette's Rest" in Somerset on 22 July 1910. The "Suffragette's Rest" was the nickname for Mary Blathwayt's home at Eagle House where her parents also indulged their WSPU enthusiasm. Her parents had set land aside to plant an individual tree for each WSPU member sentenced to prison. The planting was then photographed by Mary's father. The tree's and the photographs recorded their achievements.

In 1912, her mother, Hilda, was arrested for breaking windows. Her mother made the point that two of her sons had been killed in India on active service whilst she had little political rights. Her mother served eight days on remand and fourteen days in jail despite being 80 years old. Her mother was asked to talk at the London Pavilion when she was released in April 1912.

In 1913 the government passed the Prisoners (Temporary Discharge for Ill Health) Act which gave the authorities the power to release hunger-striking suffragettes and then rearrest them when they had recovered. It was known as the "Cat and Mouse Act" because cats are known for playing with mice before they kill them. Marie's home at 2 Campden Hill Square was used as a convalescent home for recovering hunger strikers and was nicknamed "Mouse Castle".

Emmeline Pankhurst died on 14 June 1928, Brackenbury was one of her pallbearers, alongside other former suffragettes Georgiana Brackenbury, Marion Wallace Dunlop, Harriet Kerr, Mildred Mansel, Kitty Marshall, Rosamund Massy, Marie Naylor, Ada Wright and Barbara Wylie.

== Death and legacy ==
Brackenbury died in 1950 with no close relatives. She left her home to a charity. The home in 2 Campden Hill Square has a plaque which remembers the trio of her sister, her mother and Maria.
