= Louisa Garrett Anderson =

British physician and feminist (1873–1943)

Louisa Garrett Anderson CBE
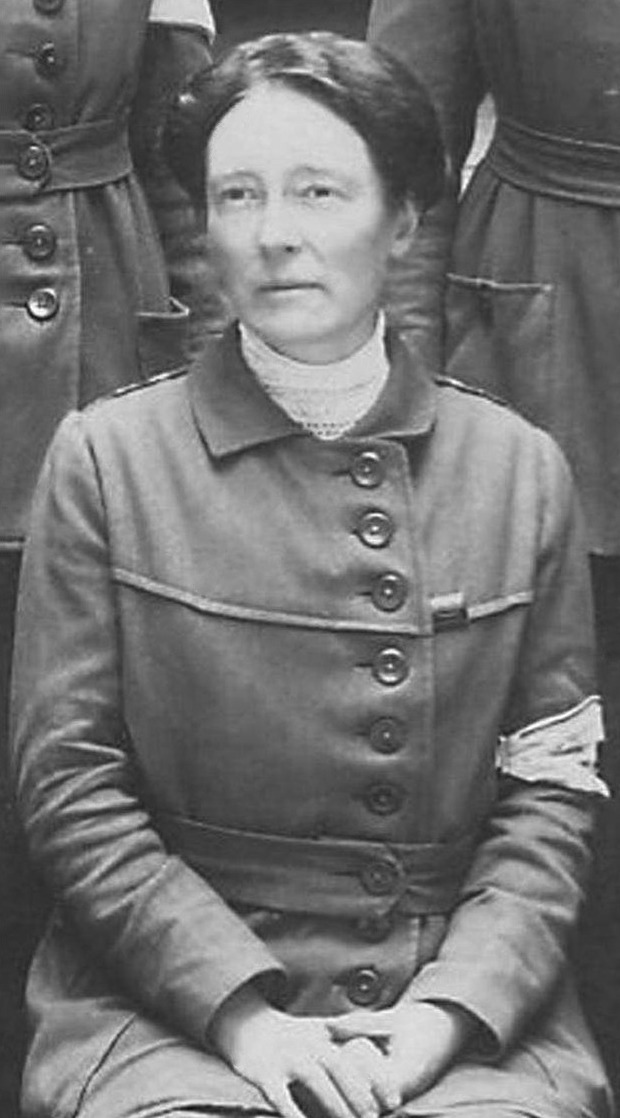
- Born: Louisa Garrett Anderson; 28 July 1873; Aldeburgh, Suffolk, England
- Died: 15 November 1943 (aged 70); Brighton, Sussex, England
- Education: St Leonards School; London School of Medicine for Women
- Known for: Military hospitals Campaigning for women's rights and social reform
- Relatives: Flora Murray (partner); Elizabeth Garrett Anderson (mother); Alan Garrett Anderson (brother)
- Medical career
- Profession: Physician and surgeon

Louisa Garrett Anderson OBE (28 July 1873 – 15 November 1943) was a medical pioneer, a member of the Women's Social and Political Union, a suffragette, and social reformer. She was the daughter of the founding medical pioneer Elizabeth Garrett Anderson, whose biography she wrote in 1939.

Anderson was the Chief Surgeon of the Women's Hospital Corps (WHC) and a Fellow of the Royal Society of Medicine. Her aunt, Dame Millicent Fawcett, was a British suffragist. Her partner was fellow doctor and suffragette Flora Murray. Her cousin was Dr Mona Chalmers Watson, who also supported suffragettes and founded the Women's Army Auxiliary Corps.

== Early life and education ==
Louisa Garrett Anderson was the oldest of three children of Elizabeth Garrett Anderson, the first woman to qualify as a doctor in Britain, co-founder of the London School of Medicine for Women and Britain's first elected woman Mayor. Her father was James George Skelton Anderson, co-owner of the Orient Steamship Company with his uncle Arthur Anderson. She was educated at St Leonards School in St Andrews and London School of Medicine for Women, where she received her Bachelor of Medicine and Bachelor of Surgery in 1898. Anderson received her Doctor of Medicine in 1900, enrolled in further postgraduate studies at Johns Hopkins Medical School and travelled to observe operations in Paris and Chicago.

== Early career ==
Despite her education, Anderson was unable to join a general major hospital, since attitudes at the time opposed female doctors treating both men and women. As a result, in 1902 she joined the New Hospital for Women, a women's-only hospital founded by her mother, which treated women and children. Anderson first worked as a surgical assistant and later as a senior surgeon. She performed gynaecological and general operations and co-published a paper with the hospital pathologist in 1908 discussing her hysterectomy operations and dissecting the 265 cases of uterine cancer treated at the New Hospital for Women.

== Women's Suffrage ==
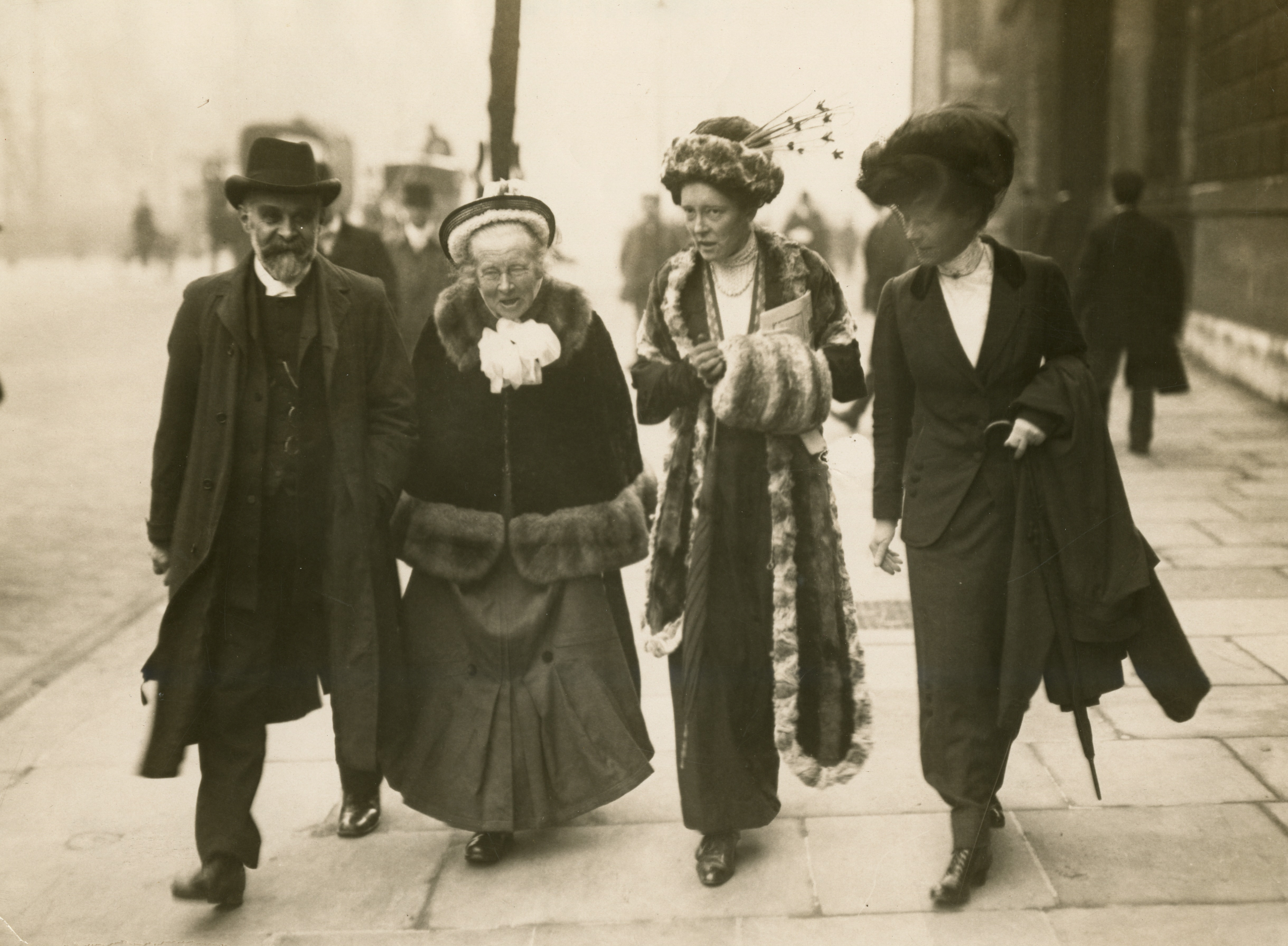
Elizabeth Garrett Anderson and Louisa Garrett Anderson, Alfred Caldecott and another in 1910 on the day they went to see the Prime Minister

From 1903, Anderson had been active in organizations affiliated with the NUWSS, which advocated for gaining voting rights through peaceful means. Frustrated by the lack of progress on voting rights, in 1907 she became an active member of the more radical WSPU. On 18 November 1910, Anderson joined her mother, Emmeline Pankhurst, Alfred Caldecott, Hertha Ayrton, Mrs Elmy, Hilda Brackenbury, Princess Sophia Duleep Singh and 300 women to petition Prime Minister Asquith for voting rights. The protest became known as Black Friday owing to the violence and sexual assault the protesters faced from the police and male bystanders. More than one hundred women were arrested, including Anderson, but all were released without charge. In 1912, she was sentenced to six weeks' hard labour in Holloway for her suffragette activities, which included breaking the window of a property at 47 Rutland Gate.

In 1914, Anderson joined Agnes Harben and the new group of women and men: H. J. Gillespie, Gerald Gould, Bessie Lansbury and George Lansbury, Mary Neal, Emmeline Pethick-Lawrence, Julia Scurr and John Scurr, Evelyn Sharp, and Edith Ayrton, Louise Eates and Lena Ashwell in starting the United Suffragists, which grew to have branches in London, Liverpool, Edinburgh and Glasgow.

== Medicine – World War I ==
When the First World War broke out, Anderson and Flora Murray founded the Women's Hospital Corps (WHC), and recruited women to staff it. Believing that the British War Office would reject their offer of help, and knowing that the French were in need of medical assistance, they offered their assistance to the French Red Cross. The French accepted their offer and provided them the space of a newly built hotel, Claridge's, in Paris as their hospital. Murray was appointed Médecin-en-Chef (chief physician) and Anderson became the chief surgeon.

Murray reported in her diary that visiting representatives of the British War Office were astonished to find a hospital run successfully by British women, and the hospital was soon treated as a British auxiliary hospital rather than a French one. In addition to the hospital in Paris, the Women's Hospital Corps also ran another military hospital in Wimereux.

In January 1915, casualties began to be evacuated to England for treatment. The War Office invited Murray and Anderson to return to London to run a large hospital, the Endell Street Military Hospital (ESMH), under the Royal Army Medical Corps. ESMH treated almost 50,000 soldiers between May 1915 and September 1919 when it closed.

At Endell, Anderson and the hospital pathologist, Helen Chambers, pioneered a new method of treating septic wounds, an antiseptic ointment called BIPP (bismuth, iodoform, and paraffin paste). The paste had been invented by James Rutherford Morison. After positive results from some initial tests by Anderson, Morison asked her and Chambers to run a larger trial of BIPP in 1916. Anderson published case studies in The Lancet, concluding that this method saved patients pain and was better than the Carrel-Dakin method, which used a more powerful antiseptic but had to be frequently reapplied to be effective. Since bandages could be left on for longer, the BIPP method reduced time spent changing bandages by as much as 80%. BIPP was widely adopted by surgeons for the rest of the war, although opinion among doctors remained divided as to the best method for wound treatment. Despite continued debate, BIPP was also used in the Second World War and continues to be in use today in ear, nose, throat, maxillofacial, and neurosurgery procedures.

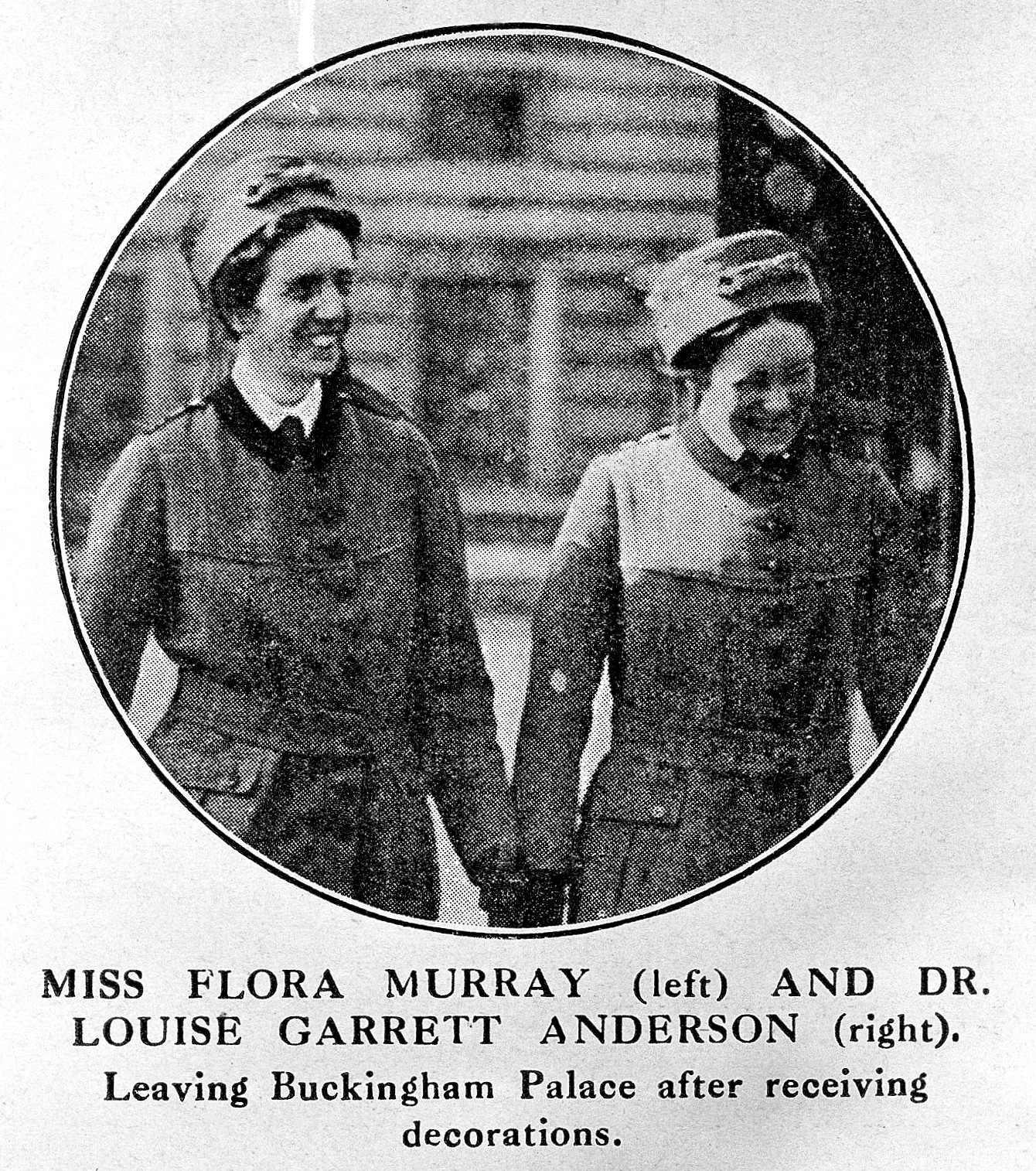
Flora Murray (left) and Louise Garrett Anderson (right) leaving Buckingham Palace after receiving decorations

== Awards ==
Murray and Anderson were both appointed to the Order of the British Empire as Commanders (CBE) in August 1917, as part of the first group to receive the honour.

== Death ==
Anderson died in Brighton and was cremated. Her ashes were scattered over the South Downs. She is memorialised on Murray's gravestone, near to their home in Penn, Buckinghamshire. The inscription reads:

To the dear love of comrades and in memory of

Flora Murray

CBE, MD, BS Durham, DPH. Cambridge

Daughter of Com John Murray RN

Murraythwaite, Dumfriesshire

Born 8 May 1869

Died 26 July 1923

She commanded the military hospital Endell Street London with the rank of Lieutenant Colonel RAMC 1915 -1919

God gave her the strength to lead, to pity and to heal

And of her friend

Louisa Garrett Anderson

C.B.E., M.D., Chief Surgeon Women's Hospital Corps 1914–1919

Daughter of James George Skelton Anderson and Elizabeth Garrett Anderson of Aldeburgh, Suffolk.

Born 28 July 1873

Died 15 November 1943

WE HAVE BEEN GLORIOUSLY HAPPY

== Archives ==
The archives of Louisa Garrett Anderson are held at The Women's Library at the Library of the London School of Economics, ref. 7LGA.

== Posthumous recognition ==
Anderson's name and picture (and those of 58 other women's suffrage supporters) are on the plinth of the statue of Millicent Fawcett in Parliament Square, London, unveiled in 2018.

== See also ==
- History of feminism
- List of suffragists and suffragettes
