= Wolseley ring =

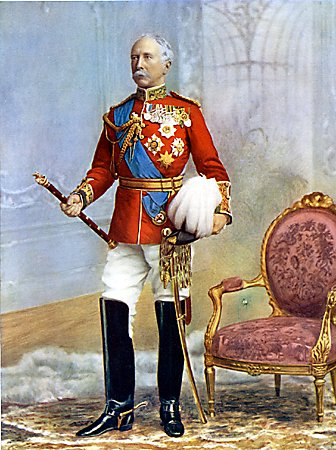

The Wolseley ring was a group of 19th century British army officers loyal to Garnet Wolseley and considered by him to be clever, brave, experienced and hard-working.

After the Crimean War Wolseley started to keep a note of the best officers he met, and began gathering a network of able military men loyal to him. There were other circles around other military leaders; later these would dwindle as more formal selection and promotion procedures became established.

The 'ring' itself was rooted in Wolseley's appointments for the Ashanti Campaign of 1873-4, in which he led British troops to take control of the Gold Coast. He chose officers he had got to know during his Red River Campaign in Canada in 1870:

- John Carstairs McNeill
- William Francis Butler
- Redvers Henry Buller
- Hugh McCalmont

as well as other key figures:

- Henry Brackenbury
- John Frederick Maurice
- George Pomeroy Colley
- Baker Creed Russell
- Henry Evelyn Wood
- John Plumptre Carr Glyn

Men from this group accompanied Wolseley on his various projects for about a decade. They are sometimes called the Ashanti Ring, or, in a punning reference to Wolseley's first name, the Garnet Ring.

Later they were the "Africans", against the "Indians" of the rival Roberts Ring of Lord Roberts and Herbert Kitchener during the Boer War. The Secretary for War Lord Lansdowne had worked with Roberts in India, so was alienated from Wolseley and most of the War Office. The Cabinet made Wolseley Commander-in-Chief of the Army, and Roberts was fobbed off as the Commander-in-Chief in Ireland. But during the Boer War, Roberts and then Kitchener replaced Buller of the Wolseley Ring.

== See also ==
- Anglo-Asante Wars
- Ashanti Kingdom
- Cardwell Reforms
