= Evans Bell =

English Indian army officer and writer

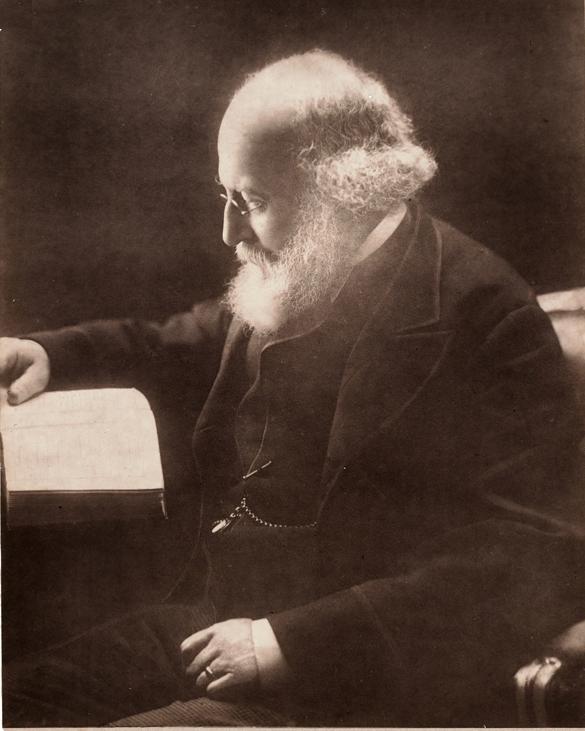
Portrait

Thomas Evans Bell (11 November 1825 – 12 September 1887) was an English Indian army officer and writer. He used the pseudonyms Undecimus (in The Reasoner) and Indicus (1865).

== Life ==
The son of William Bell, he was educated in Wandsworth, London. In 1841 he went to Madras in the East India Company's service. He was a secularist and supporter of George Jacob Holyoake, who gave Bell's name in 1856 on a short list of those who had done most for the free-thought movement, and he had a share in Holyoake's "British Secular Institute of Secularism and Propagandism". In 1851 he spoke at the first Free Discussion Festival, at the City Road Hall of Science. He was also one of John Chapman's authors. Bell was strongly critical of the East India Company, and its impact on peasant proprietorship in India.

After the Indian Rebellion of 1857, Bell lost his position in Nagpur, for complaining over the head of his immediate superior about the treatment of the Ranis of the Nagpur kingdom. In Madras in the early 1860s, he was secretary of the Madras Literary Society, and edited its Madras Journal in 1861. When Whitley Stokes moved to India, he successfully identified an anonymous translator of Omar Khayyám as Edward FitzGerald, much before this fact was generally known, and named him in the Journal. In 1864 Stokes attributed the Madras (pirate) edition of the Rubaiyat of Omar Khayyam to Bell.

Bell retired on half pay in 1866. He was a member of the London National Society for Women's Suffrage in 1866. In 1871 and 1875 he was on the council of the East India Association, where he supported trust as a principle of imperial policy. He was on the Greek Committee of 1879.

== Works ==
Evans's works included:

- Task of To-day (1852)
- The English in India (1859)
- The Empire in India (1864)
- The Rajah and Principality of Mysore: With a Letter to the Right Hon. Lord Stanley, M.P. (1865)
- The Mysore Reversion (1865)
- Remarks on the Mysore Blue Book (1866)
- Retrospects and Prospects of Indian Policy (1868)
- The Oxus and the Indus (1869)
- The Great Parliamentary Bore (1869). On the treatment of the Nawabs of the Carnatic and family.
- Our Great Vassal Empire (1870)
- Is India a Conquered Country And, If So, what Then? (1870, pamphlet)
- Public Works and the Public Service in India (1871), with Frederick Tyrrell
- The Bengal Reversion (1872)
- Last Counsels of an Unknown Counsellor (1877, editor)
- The Annexation of the Punjaub and the Maharajah Duleep Singh (1882)
- Memoirs of General John Briggs (1886)

== Family ==
Bell married Emily Magnus (c. 1839–1893), another freethinker who was an actor and classical musician. They had a daughter Ernestine (1871–1959); an older daughter had died in an outbreak of typhoid at Barnes, London, where they had moved to be close to Henry Davis Pochin and his wife Agnes. Ernestine was cared for by guardians William and Hertha Ayrton after her parents deaths and grew up to be an artist, writer and suffragette. She married the doctor Herbert Mills (1868–1947) who shared her Fabian views.
