= Georgina Brackenbury =

British painter and suffragette (1865–1949)

Georgina Agnes Brackenbury
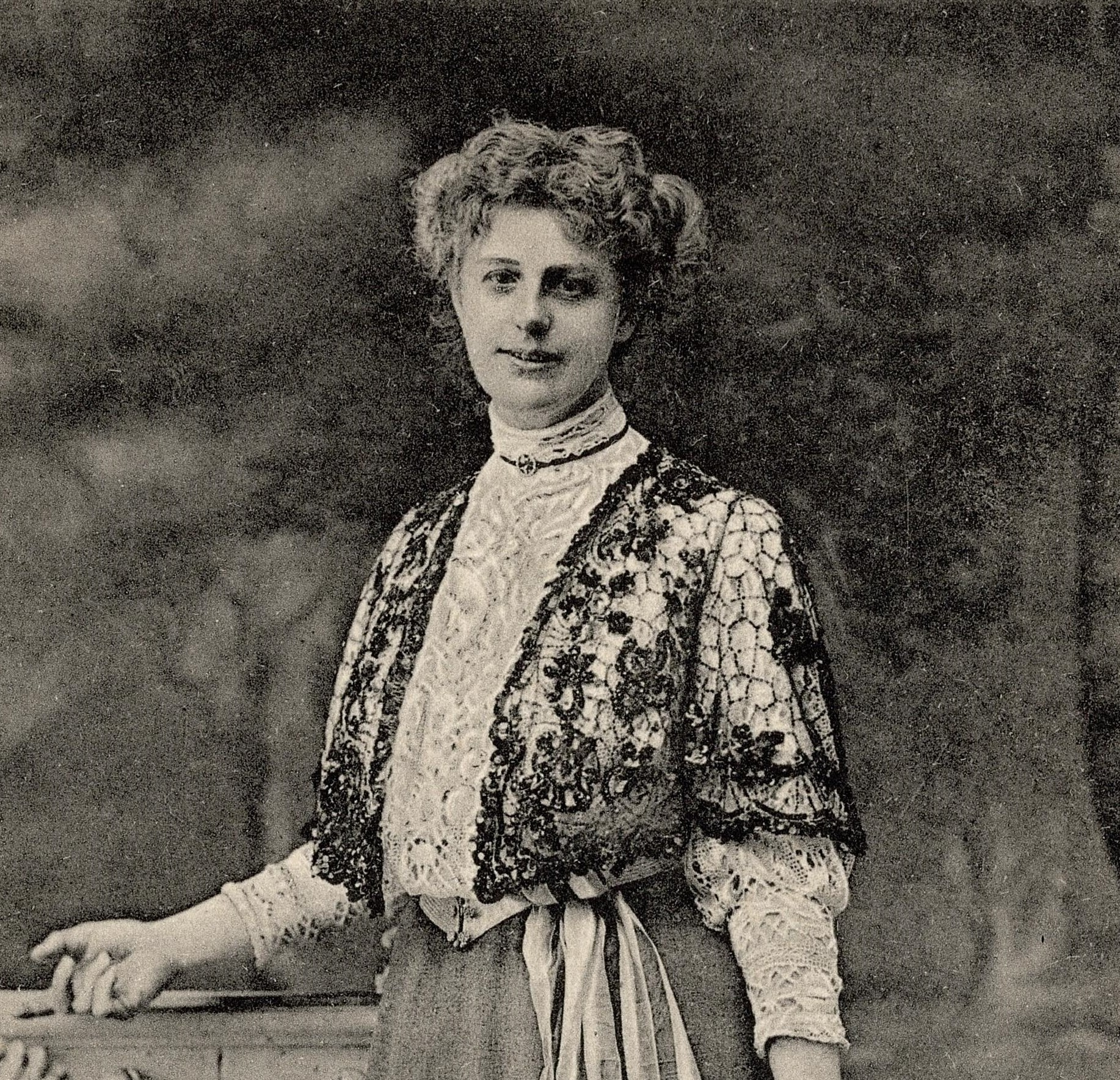
- Brackenbury
- Born: 1 July 1865; Royal Military Academy, England
- Died: 27 January 1949 (aged 83); St Mary Abbots Hospital, England
- Education: Slade School of Art
- Occupations: Painter and activist
- Known for: Artist and suffragette
- Parent(s): Hilda Eliza Brackenbury and Charles Booth Brackenbury
- Family: Sister Marie Brackenbury

Georgina "Ina" Agnes Brackenbury (1 July 1865 – 27 January 1949) was a British painter who was known as a militant suffragette. She was jailed for demonstrating for women's rights. She followed Emmeline Pankhurst's lead as she became more militant (and lost former colleagues). Brackenbury was one of Emmeline Pankhurst's pallbearers. Her portrait of Pankhurst was bought by her memorial committee for the nation.

== Early life and education ==
Brackenbury was born at Royal Military Academy in Woolwich where her father, Major General Charles Booth Brackenbury who had been a Times correspondent before he was wounded, was Director of the artillery college. Brackenbury's mother, Hilda Eliza, disliked housework, so she and her sister Marie were brought up for a time by Flora Shaw, a relative who was governess housekeeper before going on to have a successful international career as a journalist and author.

In 1890 the family moved to Kensington after the death of their father. Her parents both had artistic interests and in 1888 Georgina went to the Slade School of Art where she specialised in portraits as suggested by Hubert von Herkomer. In time her sister Maria Brackenbury would follow her lead.

== Artistic career ==
Georgina would mostly paint at home but she did hire a studio Rossetti Mansions, Chelsea. In 1894 she created a portrait of Harold Dillon, 17th Viscount Dillon who was the Chair of the trustees at the National Portrait Gallery. She exhibited at London galleries including the Royal Academy between 1891 and 1907.

== Suffrage activities ==
Their mother had been interested in women's rights and in 1907 she joined the increasingly radical Women's Social and Political Union (WSPU). Quickly Georgina and Marie also joined the WSPU and they transformed their studios in Holland Park into classrooms where they could train women in public speaking.

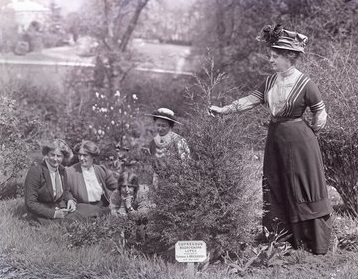
Charlotte Marsh, Laura Ainsworth, Annie Kenney, Mary Blathwayt and Georgina Brackenbury at the Suffragette's Rest

Georgina and Marie were sentenced to six weeks in prison after they joined a WSPU stunt at the House of Commons. This was the "pantechnicon raid" when a furniture van (pantechnicon) was used as a "Trojan Horse" to get twenty suffragettes to the House of Commons. When they were close both Maria and Georgina joined the many who tried to rush their way into the lobby. They met surprised police who manhandled women to the ground, more than once, as they rushed to approach the doors.

Brackenbury's imprisonment qualified her sister and herself to have a commemorative tree planted at the "Suffragette's Rest" in Somerset on 22 July 1910. The "Suffragette's Rest" was the nickname for Mary Blathwayt's home at Eagle House where her parents also indulged their WSPU enthusiasm. Her parents had set land aside to plant an individual tree for each WSPU member sentenced to prison. The planting was then photographed by Mary's father. The trees and the photographs recorded their achievements.

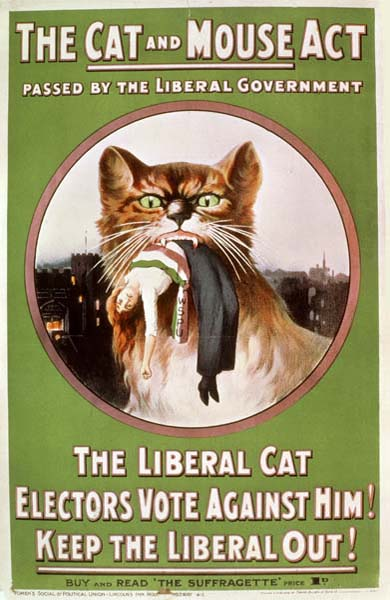
Cat and Mouse Act poster

The Brackenburys' studio also became a recuperation home for prisoners recovering from force-feeding under the notorious 'Cat and Mouse" Act, prior to be re-arrested and referred to by the movement as the 'Mouse's Castle'.

Georgina allegedly informed Christabel Pankhurst that at a function she had heard senior police state they had been instructed by government not to let suffragettes be treated as 'political' prisoners. Her art studio, which she shared with her sister, Marie, in 2 Camden Hill Square was to be the secret locus for WSPU campaigner Marion Wallace-Dunlop to reveal the militants' campaign plans to new recruits in February 1912.

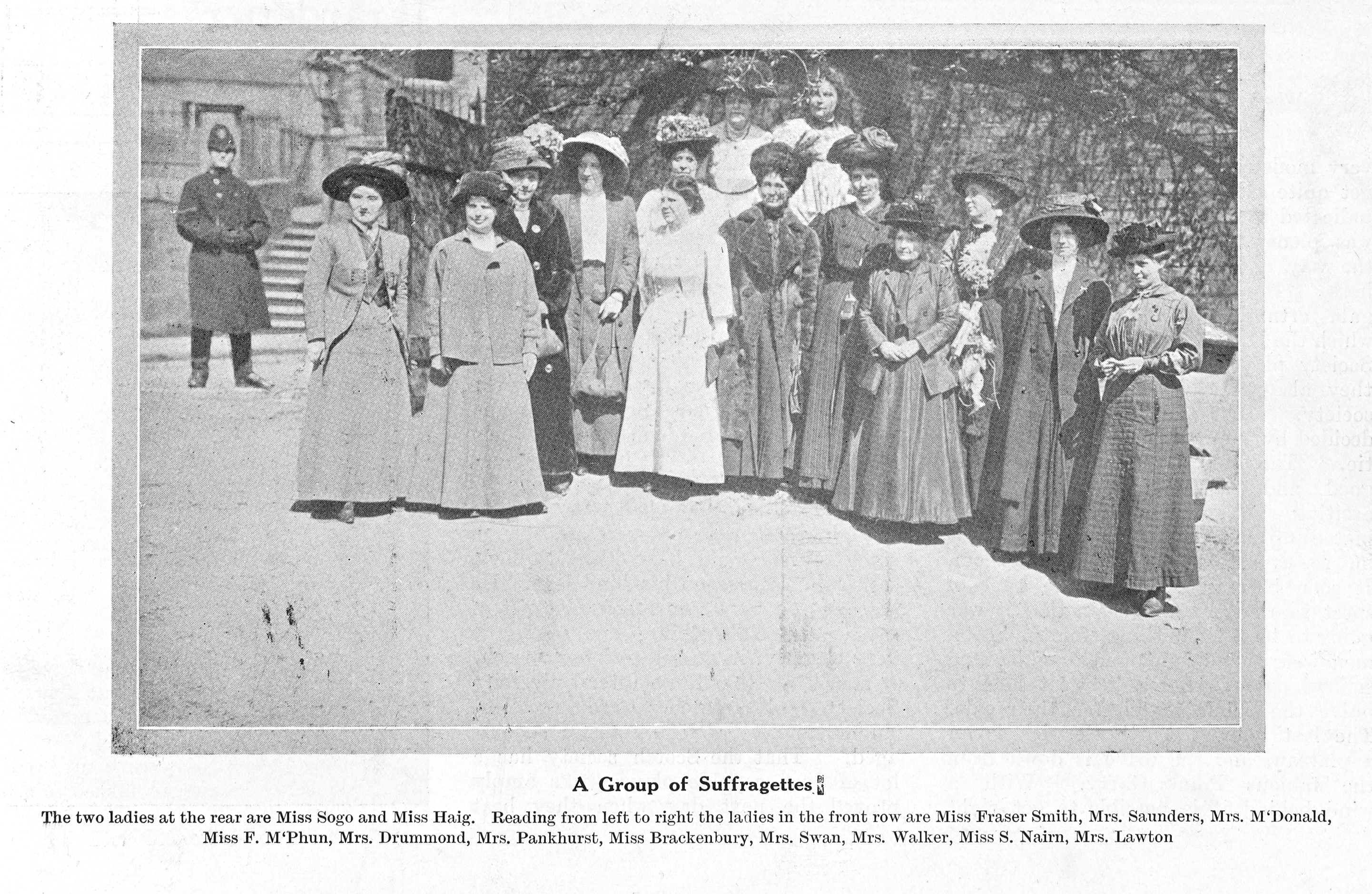
Group photograph of Suffragettes at Bazaar in Glasgow in 1910

In 1912, her own mother, Hilda, was arrested for breaking windows. Her mother made the point that two of her sons had been killed in India on active service whilst she had little political rights to vote. Her mother served eight days on remand and fourteen days in jail despite being 80 years old. Her mother was asked to talk at the London Pavilion when she was released in April 1912.

When Emmeline Pankhurst died on 14 June 1928, Brackenbury was one of her pallbearers, alongside other former suffragettes her sister, Marion Wallace Dunlop, Harriet Kerr, Mildred Mansel, Kitty Marshall, Marie Naylor, Ada Wright and Barbara Wylie.

== Death and legacy ==
Brackenbury died in St Mary Abbots in 1949, and her 2 Camden Hill Square, Holland Park home was left to a group providing clubs and hostel accommodation for women over thirty (the Over Thirties Association, founded 1934). The Suffragette Fellowship marked the house with a plaque stating "The Brackenbury trio were so whole-hearted and helpful during all the early strenuously years of the militant suffrage movement. We remember them with honour".

Brackenbury has portraits in the National Portrait Gallery including a painting of Emmeline Pankhurst which was bought by Pankhurst's memorial committee. An enamel plaque of the Brackenbury women including an image of a woman in a natural meadow scene, freed from chains by Ernestine Mills is held in the Museum of London collections.
