= Harriet Sheppard =

Canadian botanist, entomologist and naturalist (1786–1858)

- Born: Henrietta Campbell; 1786
- Died: 1858 (aged 71–72)
- Citizenship: Canadian
- Known for: Naturalist, ornithologist, botanist
- Scientific career
- Author abbrev. (botany): Sheppard

Henrietta "Harriet" Sheppard, née Campbell (1786–1858) was a Canadian naturalist, ornithologist and botanist. She was noted for studying and publishing on birds, shells, and plants of the Quebec region.

== Early and family life ==
Harriet Campbell was born in 1786 into a family of United Empire Loyalists to Charlotte (née Saxton) and Archibald Campbell Sr, a merchant in the timber trade. The family migrated to Nova Scotia following the American Revolution, moving to Quebec in 1790 where they prospered and became well known in the city. One brother, John Saxton Campbell became a merchant and seigneur, another brother, Archibald Campbell Jnr, was a successful lawyer. Her sister Louisa Sophia married politician Jonathan Wurtele.

In 1809, Harriet Campbell married William Sheppard, a merchant in the same timber trade as her family. They had seven children, but only Charles Campbell, Charlotte, William and Maxfield lived to adulthood. Charlotte married politician Robert Nugent Watts and had a son William John Watts.

The couple bought a property of 100 acres in Sillery in 1816, naming it “Woodfield”. They installed a library with 3,000 books, as well as a gallery and a natural history museum. They added greenhouses, transformed the gardens and built aviaries which housed an European Linnet and a Serin, alongside birds indigenous to North America, particularly ones with beautiful songs or attractive colourings.

The neighbouring estate was Spencer Wood, owned by Anne Mary Perceval and her husband. Mrs Perceval moved to Quebec in 1810 and used her estate to expand her interest in botany, collecting 150 species on the property. Their mutual interest in the subject led to a friendship with her neighbour Harriet Sheppard.

== Work in natural history ==
Sheppard was noted for studying and publishing on birds, shells, and plants of the Quebec region.

Harriet and William Sheppard, alongside her brother Archibald, were key figures in the creation of the Literary and Historical Society of Quebec in 1824. The

Working with Anne Mary Perceval and Christian Ramsay (Lady Dalhousie) she collected plants of the region. Along with Perceval, Ramsay, and Mary Brenton, she was a contributor to William Jackson Hooker’s Flora boreali-Americana (1829–1840). The three women provided 80% of the information relating to Quebec in the publication.

Sheppard's first publication was in 1829, in a paper On recent shells which characterize Quebec and its environs in the proceedings of the Société pour l’encouragement des sciences et d’arts en Canada (SESA). She was awarded "une médaille honorifique ... pour un écrit scientifique sur la Conchologie des environs de Québec" (an honorary medal for a scientific paper on the conchology of the area around Quebec City) for the paper. The Quebec Mercury noted the publication, stating that it was “pleasing to find a contribution from a Lady in this Volume” and that the “time is past when literary and scientific pursuits were considered as beyond the attainment of the female mind”.

== Publications ==
On the Recent shells which characterise Quebec and its environs in Transactions, Literary and Historical Society of Quebec, Original Series 1, Volume 1 (1829).

Notes on some of the Canadian songbirds in Transactions, Literary and Historical Society of Quebec, Original Series, Volume 3 (1837).

== Author abbreviation ==
The standard author abbreviation Sheppard is used to indicate this person as the author when citing a botanical name.

== Legacy ==
Kew Gardens' entry on Zanthoxylum tricarpum, known as Z. americanum, uses Sheppard's Z. fraxineum definition as a synonym.
