= Alfred Caldecott =

English philosopher (1850–1936)

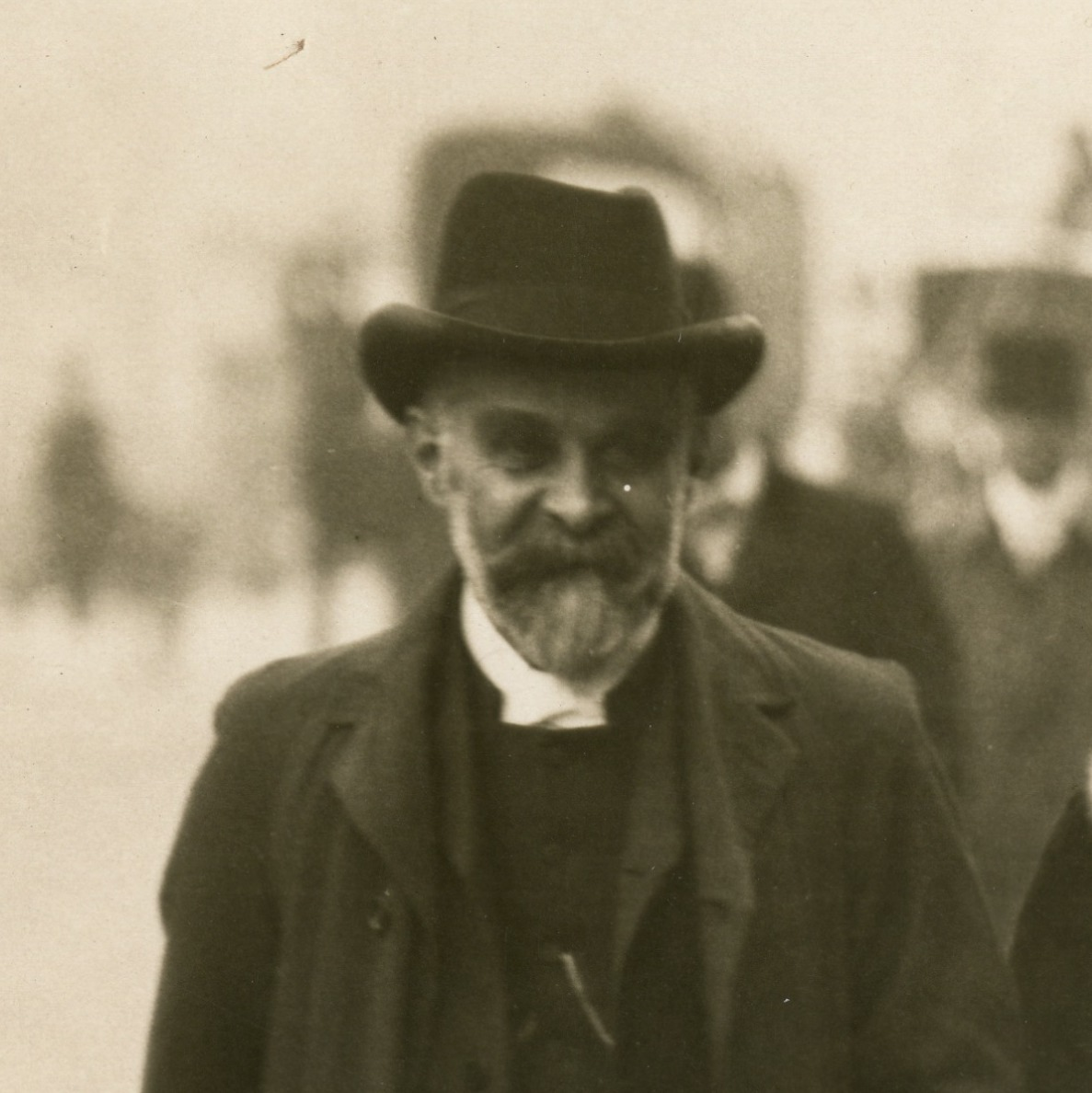
- Born: 9 November 1850; Chester
- Died: 8 February 1936 (aged 85); Malvern
- Education: St John's College, Cambridge
- Known for: Philosophy

Alfred Caldecott (/ˈkɔːldəkɒt/ KAWL-də-kot; 9 November 1850 – 8 February 1936) was an English philosopher.

== Early life ==
Caldecott was born at Challoner House, Crook Street, Chester. His father, John Caldecott, was an accountant, twice married with 13 children. Caldecott was his sixth child by his first wife Mary Dinah (née Brookes). His older brother Randolph was an English artist and illustrator. In 1860 the family moved to 23 Richmond Place at Boughton, Cheshire just outside Chester. He spent the last five years of his schooling at The King's School, Chester.

In 1871 he was an assistant teacher at “Whalley Range School”, Chorlton Road, Manchester, which was run by Duncan Christie Fergusson. Census record states that he had already graduated from London University by this time.

In 1876 Caldecott went to St John's College, Cambridge to read the Moral Sciences Tripos and he took First Class honours in 1880. He was then elected to a Fellowship at St John's. He was one of the founders of the Cambridge University Moral Sciences Club and the first meeting took place on 19 October 1878 in his rooms at St John's.

== Career ==
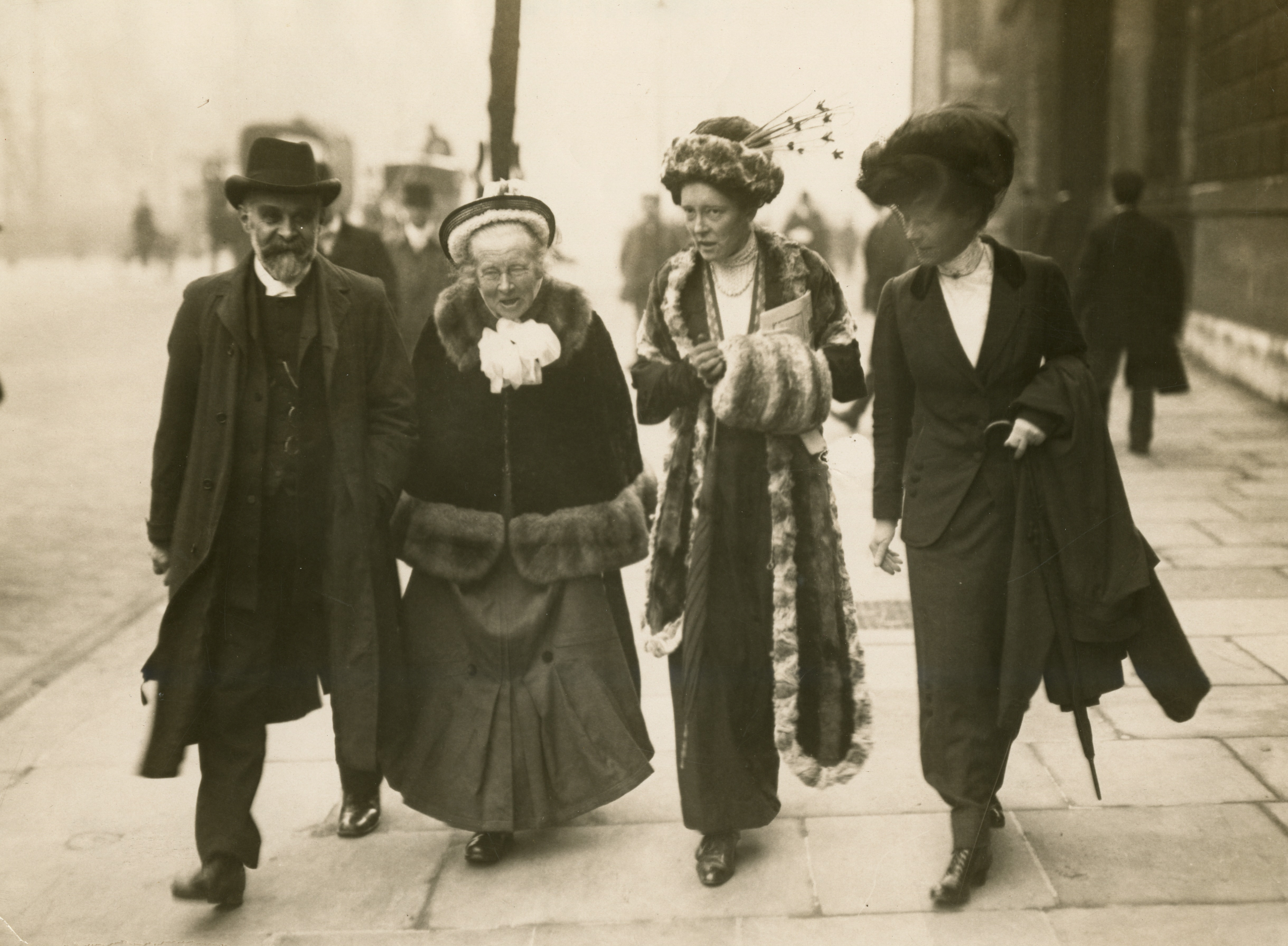
Elizabeth and Louisa Garrett Anderson and Alfred Caldecott on the day they went to see the Prime Minister

After gaining his degree, Caldecott was elected to a Fellowship at St John's. He then took Holy Orders and became rector of North and South Topham in Norfolk from 1895-98. He joined King's College London in 1891 first as Chair of Logic and Mental Philosophy, then later as Chair of Mental and Moral Philosophy. He developed a syllabus with a renewed emphasis on theological issues. He was Dean of King's College from 1913–17; and Prebendary of St Paul's from 1915 to 1935.

Caldecott wrote several books on religious subjects including: English Colonialism and the Empire (1891)and The Philosophy of Religion in England and America (1901). He also collaborated with his brother Randolph on one book: Aesop's Fables (1883). The book contained his translation of Aesop from the original Greek.

In 1910 he made up a deputation with Elizabeth Garrett Anderson and Louisa Garrett Anderson who were allowed to put forward the case, for women to have the vote, to the Prime Minister.

He died on 8 February 1936, aged 85, at Malvern.

A portrait of Alfred painted by his brother Randolph Caldecott hangs in the Liverpool Academy of Arts.
