= Jonathan Würtele =

Canadian politician (1792–1853)

Jonathan Würtele (September 16, 1792 – November 19, 1853) was a seigneur, merchant and political figure in Lower Canada.

He was born in Quebec City in 1792, the son of a merchant of German origin. He entered business at Quebec and took over the operation of his father's business when his father retired in 1819. He married Louisa Sophia, the sister of notary Archibald Campbell and botanist Harriet Sheppard, in 1824. In 1830, he was elected to the Legislative Assembly of Lower Canada for William-Henry. He voted against the Ninety-Two Resolutions, although he sometimes supported the parti patriote in the assembly. When his father died in 1831, he inherited the seigneuries of Deguire (also known as Rivière-David) and Bourg-Marie-Est. Würtele was named petty judge in 1836 and also served as president of the school board.

In 1841, Würtele stood for election to the Legislative Assembly of the new Province of Canada as a pro-union candidate, but was defeated by Joseph-Guillaume Barthe, who opposed the union.

He died at his manor in 1853 and was entombed at the Notre Dame des Neiges Cemetery in Montreal.

His son Jonathan Saxton later became a judge and was speaker for the Quebec legislative assembly.
