= Ernestine Mills =

English metalworker, enameller, artist, writer and suffragette

Mills making jewellery

Ernestine Evans Mills (née Bell; 1871 – 6 February 1959) was an English metalworker and enameller who became known as an artist, writer and suffragette. She was the author of The Domestic Problem, Past, Present, and Future (1925). Three pieces of jewellery that Mills created for the suffragettes are in the Museum of London.

== Background ==
Mills was born in Hastings to Emily "Mynie" Ernest Bell (née Magnus; c. 1839 – 1893), an actor and classical musician, and her husband, Thomas Evans Bell, a writer. Mynie and Thomas Bell were both members of the Central Committee of the National Society for Women's Suffrage. Mynie Bell was one of the signatories of the 1866 petition, organised by Barbara Bodichon, asking that all householders be given the vote.

She was educated at home with a governess, then at Notting Hill High School for Girls and taught drawing from a young age by the artist Frederic Shields, a friend of the family.

Her father died in 1887 and her mother in 1893, and she was supported for a time by guardians, William Edward and Hertha Ayrton. She attended South Kensington School of Art Finsbury Central Technical School, and was awarded a place at the Slade Art School. An apprentice to Frederic Shields, she also studied enamelling under Alexander Fisher. She acted as vice-president for the craft section of the Society of Women Artists for a period.

In 1898 Mills married the doctor Herbert Henry Mills (1868–1947), who shared her Fabian views and was physician to Richard and Emmeline Pankhurst. They had a daughter, Hermia Mills (1902–1987), who became a doctor.

In May 1915, Hertha Ayrton tested an 'anti-gas fan’ in Mill's back garden in Kensington. It was later adopted as a device to clear poisonous chemical gases from British frontline trenches during the First World War. The story was transmuted into a scene in the 1924 novel The Call later written by Ayrton's step daughter Edith Zangwill.

== Activism ==
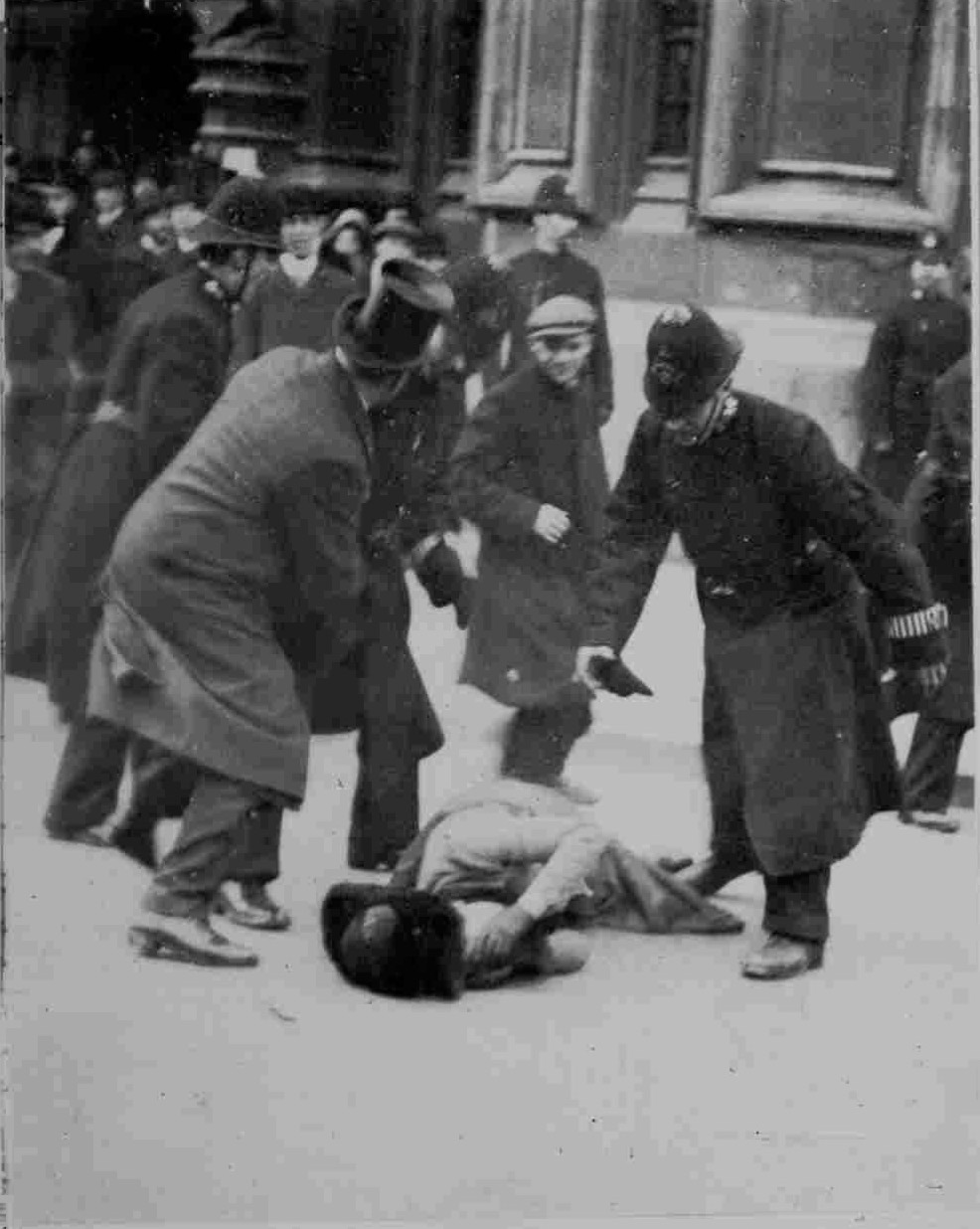
A suffragette on the ground, Black Friday, 18 November 1910

In 1907 Mills joined Emmeline Pankhurst's Women's Social and Political Union (WSPU) and by 1909 had joined the Fabian Women's Group. According to the British National Archives, Mills was possibly the woman on the ground in the photograph on the Daily Mirror front page on 19 November 1910, the day after the "Black Friday" suffragette demonstration outside the House of Commons. (Note: The National Archives Catalogue: "Reference: COPY 1/551/264: 'Photograph [of] lady lying on ground, policeman looking at her, other figures near'. [Suffragette movement. Black Friday demonstration, 18 November 1910. There is some dispute over the identity of the parties depicted. Some sources have identified Mrs Ernestine Mills prone and Dr Herbert Mills in top hat. However, there is contemporary testimony to the effect that it is Ada Wright prone]".) The photograph was published under the headline: "Violent Scenes at Westminster Where Many Suffragettes Were Arrested While Trying to Force Their Way Into the House of Commons." Other sources have identified the woman as the suffragette Ada Wright. (Note: These include Georgiana Solomon in a letter to Home Secretary Winston Churchill on 17 December 1910; Sylvia Pankhurst in her book The Suffragette Movement (1931); Ada Wright herself in an interview published in 1973; suffrage researcher Caroline Morrell; and the historians Diane Atkinson and Elizabeth Crawford. In her reference guide to the women's suffrage movement, Crawford writes "The front page of the Daily Mirror of 19 November shows Ada Wright lying on the ground, a tiny cowering figure. The chief commissioner of police expressed the opinion that he thought from the smiling expression of a boy seen in the background, and from the fact that there was not a dense crowd around the police, that the woman had simply sunk to the ground exhausted with struggling with the police. The picture in the 25 November issue of Votes for Women shows that the police are holding back a large crowd, a man who had come to Ada Wright's aid has been seized by the police, and another policeman is bending over her, apparently about to grasp her by her upheld arm. Ada Wright's predicament produced the iconic image of 'Black Friday'. She reported that the government suppressed copies of the Daily Mirror and ordered negatives of the photographs to be destroyed. The WSPU made full use of its moral advantage and used a photograph of the incident in Leaflet 75—'Plain Facts about Suffrage Deputations'.")

=== Works ===
The Museum of London holds three pieces of jewellery Mills made for the suffragettes. One is an enamel-and-silver pendant of winged Hope singing outside prison bars with semi-precious stones of purple, green and white, created to celebrate the release from prison of Louise Eates, Honorary Secretary of the Kensington branch of the WSPU. The other two are brooches, one in the WSPU colours, with the words "Votes for Women" in white on a green wreath and purple background, and the second, made for the Women's Freedom League (WFL), reads "Votes for Women" in the WFL colours: green, white and gold.

Mills was the author of The Domestic Problem, Past, Present, and Future (1925), on the nature of domestic work, and The Life and Letters of Frederic Shields (1912), a biography of her teacher.

Mills was a member of the Soroptimist Greater London club, founded in 1924, and for which she created an enamelled President's badge in 1933. The Soroptimist International of London Mayfair commissioned a painted enamel President's badge from her in 1946, paying seven guineas for it. The design included their founding date of 1942 and commemorates the Alpha Club, founded in 1928, from which they grew, with the chain ultimately listing the names of the club's presidents from 1942 to 2006, including Flora Drummond. The chain is now held at the V&A Museum.

== Death ==
Ernestine Mills died on 6 February 1959, aged 88. She was cremated at Mortlake Crematorium the ceremony attended by her daughter, Dr Hermia Mills, and members of the Society for Women Artists, and the Soroptimist Club of Greater London.

Her obituary in The Times described her as "a vivid personality, well known in Kensington, where she lived all her life. A very unconventional upbringing of late Victorian days made her an Edwardian of the modern school, a friend of Mrs Pankhurst, and a champion of women’s rights. She had a courtesy and sympathy for all and was beloved of a large circle of friends."
