= Charles Booth Brackenbury =

British major general and military correspondent

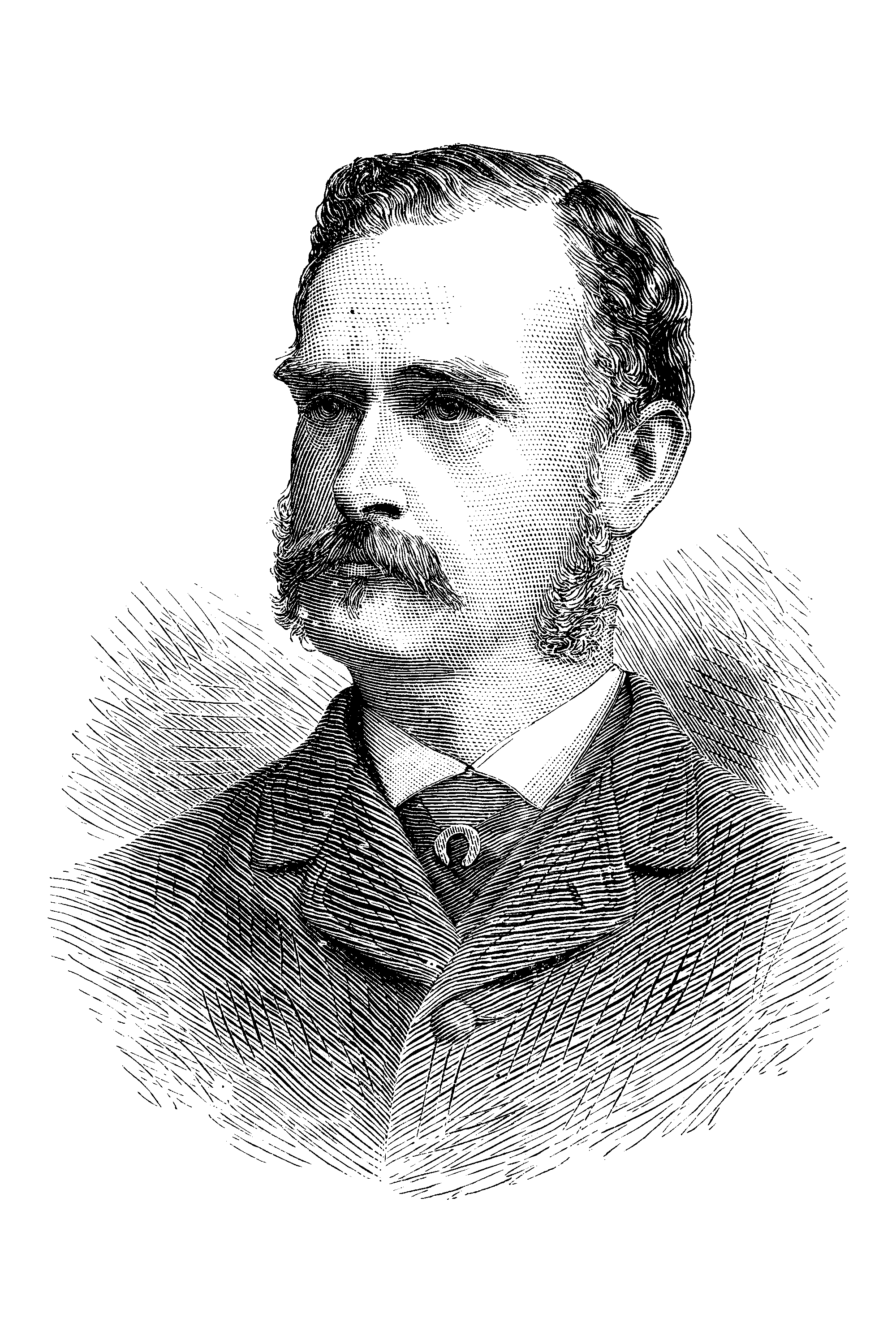
- Born: 7 November 1831; London
- Died: 20 June 1890 (aged 58)

Charles Booth Brackenbury (7 November 1831 – 20 June 1890) was a British major general and military correspondent, part of a Lincolnshire family whose members fought in nearly all of Britain's wars of the 19th century. He saw service in the Crimean War, and was present at the Battle of Königgrätz (1866) and the Russo-Turkish War (1877–1878). He was one of the most extensive military writers in the mid to late 19th century.

== Early life ==
Brackenbury was born on 7 November 1831 in London, the third son of William Brackenbury (an army veteran wounded at Talavera and Salamanca, and younger brother of Edward Brackenbury) and Maria (née Atkinson). He became a cadet in July 1847 at the Royal Military Academy, Woolwich.

His younger brother Henry (1837–1914) also became a distinguished army officer and military author.

== Career ==
Commissioned as a Royal Artillery second lieutenant in 1850, Brackenbury was eventually promoted to lieutenant in September 1852 before serving (with the chestnut troop of the horse artillery) in the Crimean War in 1855 and 1856, being decorated for services at the Siege of Sevastopol (1854–55). He was promoted to second captain in November 1857, and sent to Malta.

Subsequent promotions for Brackenbury include his appointment in 1860 to assistant instructor in artillery at the Royal Military Academy, and his 1864 promotion to assistant director of artillery studies at Woolwich and promotion to second captain. He was later promoted to first captain in 1865. Following the Representation of the People Act 1867 he served as a boundary commissioner. In April 1876 he became superintending officer of garrison instruction at Aldershot, and in 1880 superintendent of Waltham Abbey Royal Gunpowder Mills. He was promoted to colonel in 1881, and commanded the artillery in the south-eastern district from May 1886 to June 1887, when he was appointed director of artillery studies at Woolwich. On 1 October 1889 he was appointed director of the Artillery College, and given the temporary rank of major-general.

== Correspondent career and other writing ==
Besides his military battle service, Brackenbury was also a military correspondent with The Times for the Austrian Army where he was present at the 1866 Battle of Königgrätz. He was at the 1871 Battle of Le Mans during the Franco-Prussian War and was Times correspondent during the Russo-Turkish war of 1877.

Brackenbury's other writing and editing works included The Constitutional Forces of Great Britain, Field Works: Their Technical Construction and Tactical Application and Frederick the Great. He also contributed to the Journal of the Royal United Service Institution.

== Personal life ==
In April 1854, Brackenbury married Hilda Eliza (youngest daughter of Archibald Campbell of Quebec), and together they had six sons and three daughters. Two sons Charles and Lionel both joined the Indian staff corps before they both died in India. Two daughters, Georgina and Marie, both became painters and suffragettes.

Brackenbury died of heart failure on 20 June 1890 while travelling by rail. He was buried with military honours at Plumstead Cemetery.

== Works ==
- Frederick the Great (1884)
