= Henry Brackenbury =

British Army general

General The Right Honourable Sir Henry Brackenbury GCB KCSI
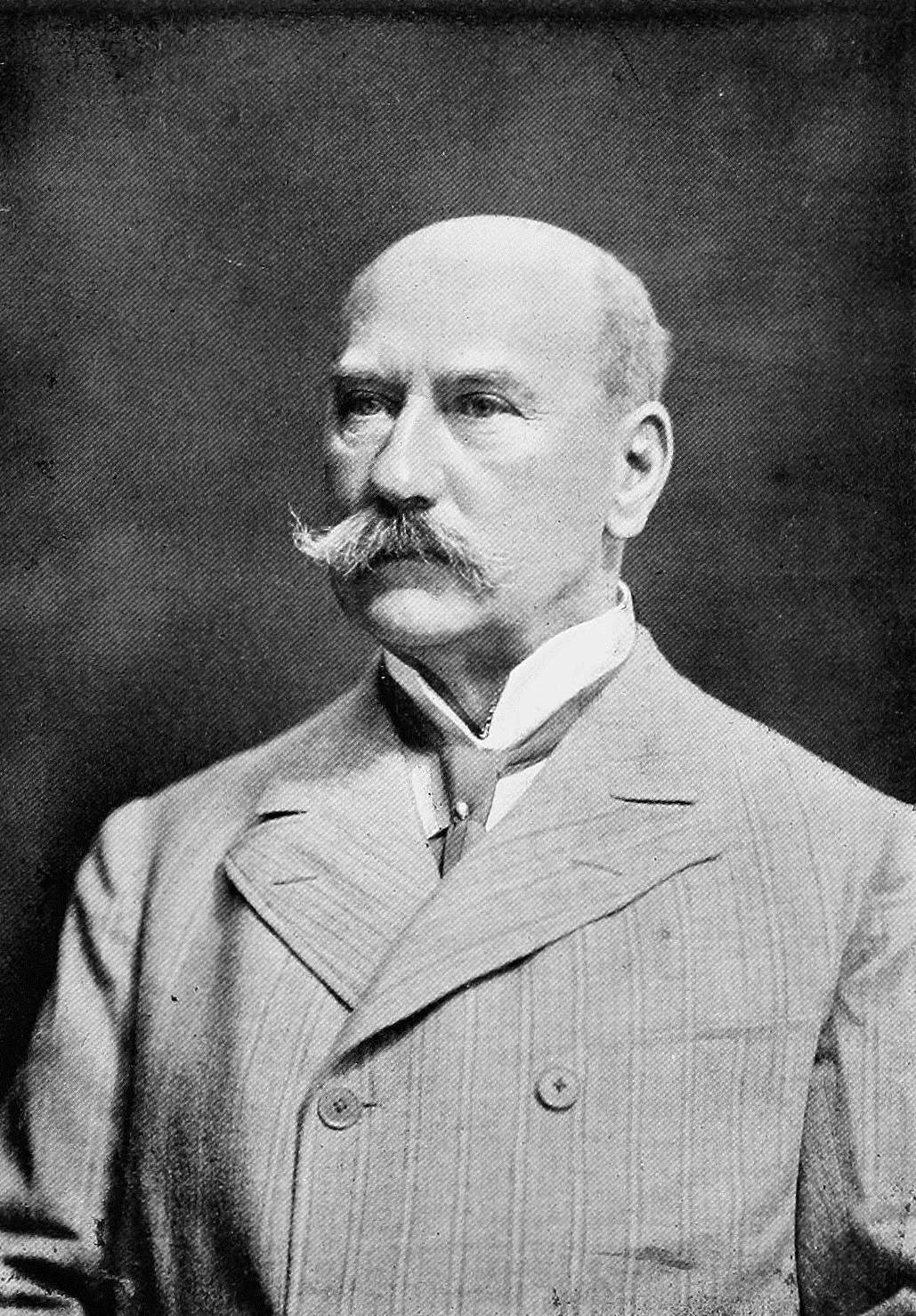
- Portrait of Henry Brackenbury, by F. B. Ciolina, 1904
- Born: 1 September 1837; Bolingbroke, Lincolnshire, England
- Died: 20 April 1914 (aged 76); Nice, France
- Military career
- Allegiance: United Kingdom
- Branch: British Army
- Service years: 1856–1904
- Rank: General
- Conflicts: Central Indian Campaign
- Awards: Knight Grand Cross of the Order of the Bath; Knight Commander of the Order of the Star of India

General Sir Henry Brackenbury, GCB, KCSI, PC (1 September 1837 – 20 April 1914) was a British Army officer who was assistant to Garnet Wolseley in the 1870s and became part of his 'Ring' of loyal officers. He also wrote several books of military history and memoirs.

== Life and career ==
Henry Brackenbury was born in Old Bolingbroke, Lincolnshire on 1 September 1837 and was a younger brother of Charles Booth Brackenbury. He was the son of William Brackenbury (1789-1844) and Maria Atkinson (1795-1870). Henry was educated at Tonbridge School and Eton, then at the Royal Military Academy, Woolwich. He joined the British Army in 1856, served in the Central Indian Campaign in 1857–58 and observed the Franco-Prussian War in 1870–71.

After making Wolseley's acquaintance, Brackenbury offered to join his Ashanti Campaign (1873–74) at which time he became part of the Wolseley ring, and later acted as his military secretary in the Zulu War of 1879–80. Wolseley thought highly of his talents and helped advance his career. However, Brackenbury was unpopular with other colleagues and with Lady Wolseley.

He became Private Secretary to the Viceroy of India in 1880, acted as British Military attaché in Paris between 1881 and 1882, and then became assistant Under-Secretary to the Lord Lieutenant of Ireland. He had a senior role in the River Column in Egypt in 1884–85.

He was promoted to major general for distinguished service in the field, then became director of Military Intelligence in 1886. From 1891 he was a member of the Council of the Viceroy of India, and in 1896 became president of the War Office Ordnance Committee until 1899. He was made colonel commandant of the Royal Artillery in 1897, and promoted to the rank of a full general on 26 September 1901.

He was appointed Director-General of Ordnance in 1899, and as such was responsible for army ordnance (including the reserves of arms, ammunitions, clothing and other equipment) throughout the Second Boer War, which took place in South Africa from October 1899 to June 1902. For his service during the war, he was promoted to a Knight Grand Cross of the Order of the Bath (GCB) in the April 1901 South African War honours list. Following the end of the war, he gave evidence to the Elgin Commission on the conduct of the war.

Towards the end of his career Brackenbury was a patron of Robertson and helped arrange his appointment to do intelligence work at the War Office.

Brackenbury retired in 1904 and was made a Privy Councillor. His married first in 1861 Emilia Halswell (who died in 1905, when they had long been separated), and secondly in 1905 Edith Desanges. He died on 20 April 1914 in the Excelsior Hotel Regina in Nice, France.

Sir Henry Brackenbury Road, built on the former School of Service Intelligence site in Ashford, Kent, is named after him.

== Decorations ==
Most Honourable Order of the Bath

- Companion, CB 1880
- Knight Commander, KCB 1894
- Knight Grand Cross, GCB, 29 November 1900, in recognition of services in connection with the Campaign in South Africa 1899-1900

Order of the Star of India

- Knight Commander, KCSI 1896 for service as Member of Council in India

== Publications ==
- The Last Campaign of Hanover, 1870
- The Tactics of the Three Arms, 1873
- Narrative of the Ashantee War (2 vol.) 1874
- The River Column, 1885
- Some Memories of My Spare Time, 1909

== See also ==
- Ashanti Confederacy

== Sources ==
- Brice, Christopher (2012). The Thinking Man's Soldier: The Life and Career of General Sir Henry Brackenbury 1837-1914. Helion & Company. ISBN 978-1907677694.
- Harvie, Ian (March 1999). A Very Dangerous Man – a Profile of Sir Henry Brackenbury. Soldiers of the Queen (Journal of the Victorian Military Society).
- Woodward, David R (1998). Field Marshal Sir William Robertson. Westport Connecticut & London: Praeger. ISBN 0-275-95422-6.

Military offices
Preceded by Aylmer Cameron; As Assistant Quartermaster-General, Intelligence Branch	Director of Military Intelligence; 1886–1891	Succeeded by Edward Chapman
