= Joseph Brackenbury =

English poet

Joseph Brackenbury (1788–1864), was an English poet.

== Biography ==
Brackenbury was born in 1788 at Langton, Lincolnshire, where he spent his early years. On 28 October 1808 he enrolled at Corpus Christi College, Cambridge. In 1810 he published his Natale Solum and other Poetical Pieces by subscription. In 1811 he graduated B.A.; in 1812 he became chaplain to the Madras establishment, and returning after some years' service proceeded M.A. in 1819. From 1828 to 1856 he was chaplain and secretary to the Magdalen Hospital, Blackfriars Road, London. In 1862 he became rector of Quendon, Essex, and died there, of heart disease, on 31 March 1864, aged 76.
