= Ada Wright =

British suffragette (1862–1939)

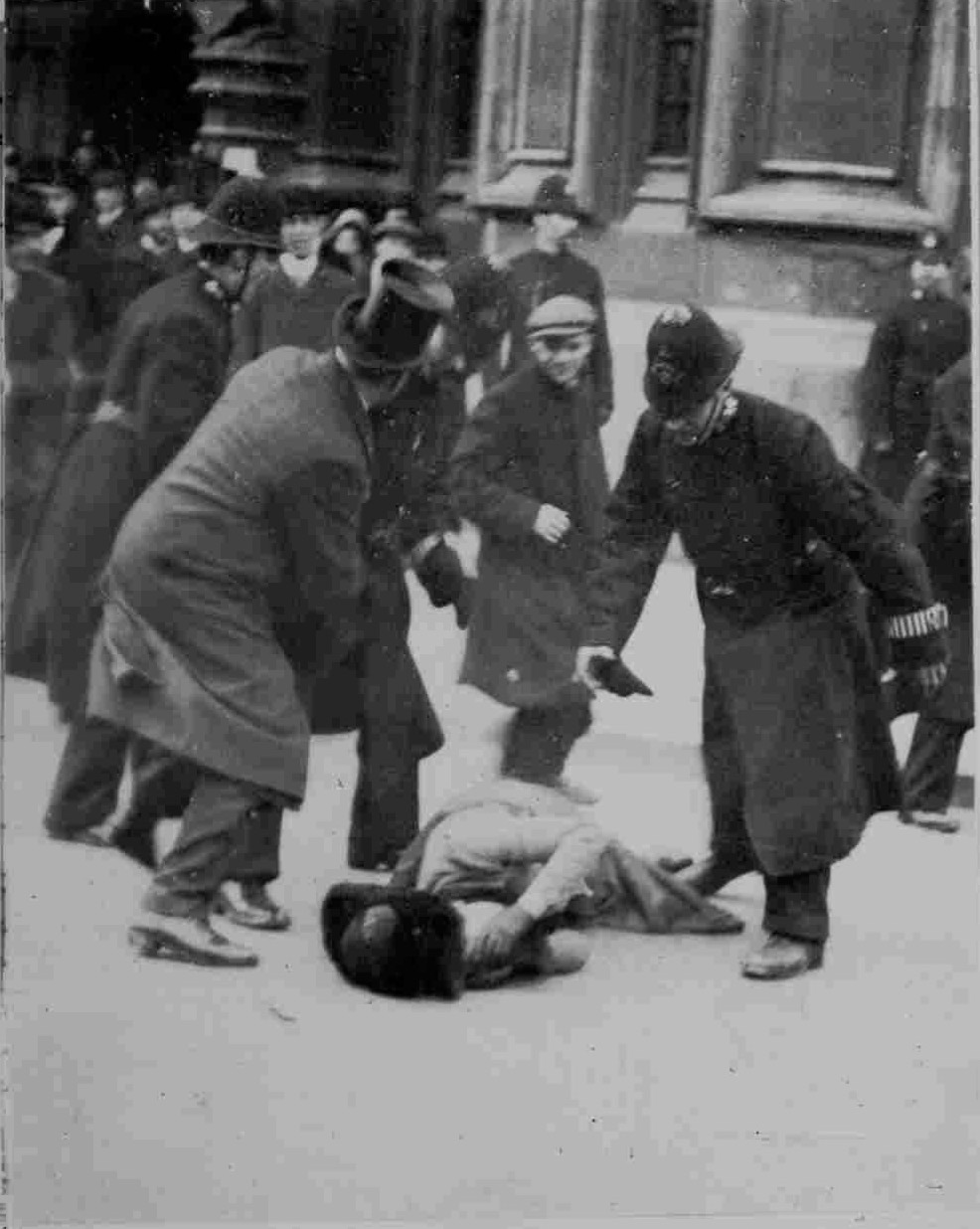
A possible photograph of Ada Wright, or her fellow suffragette Ernestine Mills

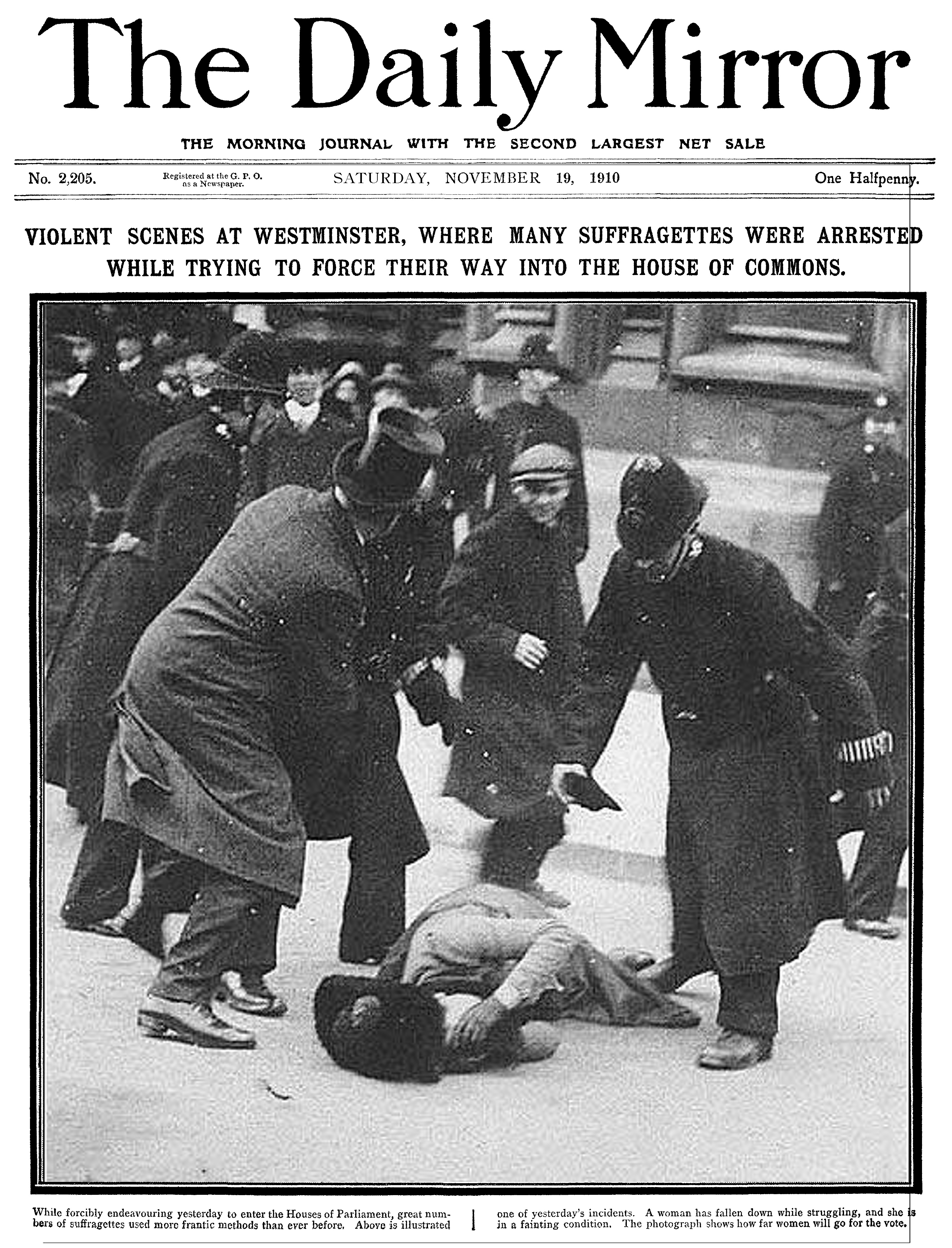
Front page of The Daily Mirror, 19 November 1910

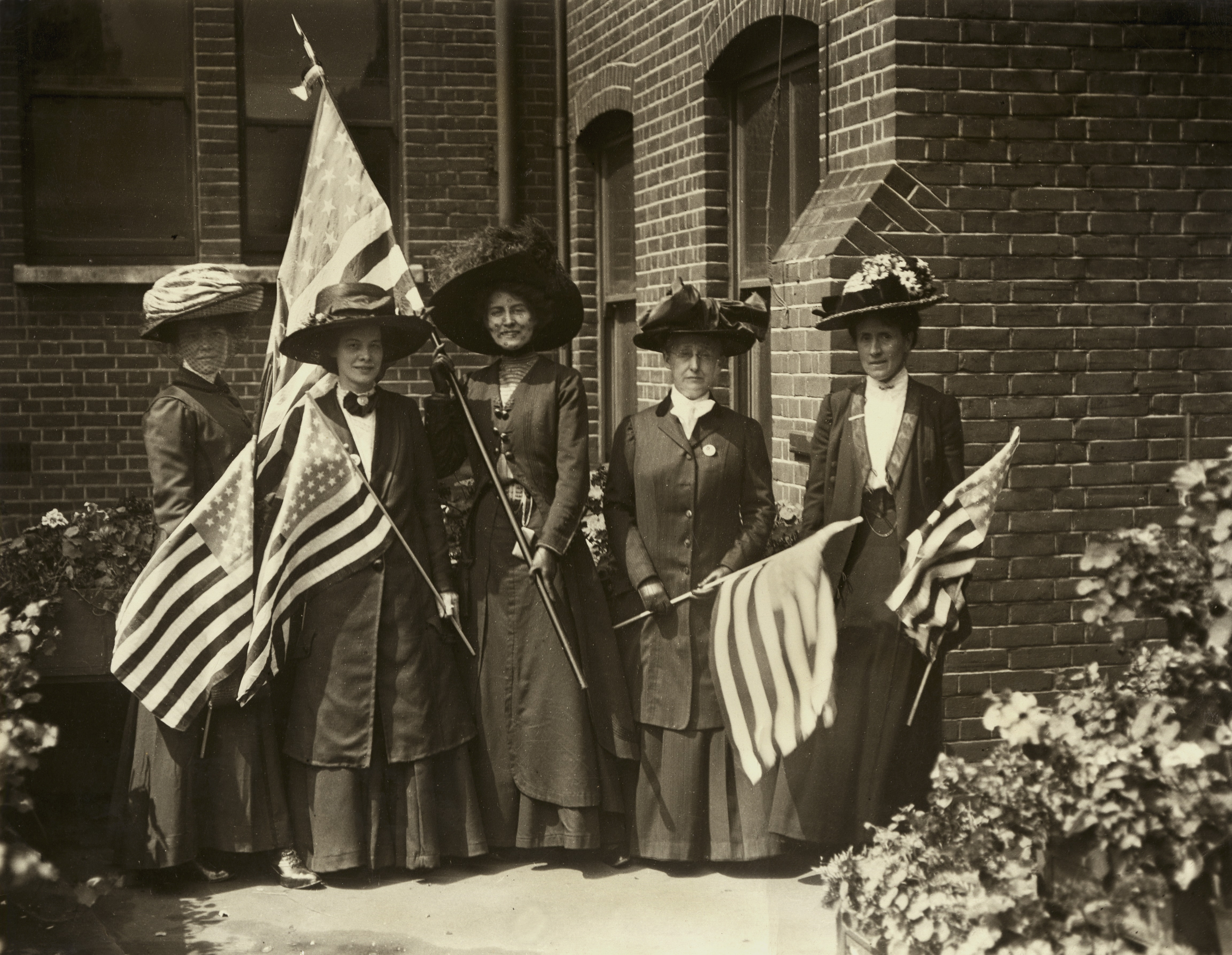
Ada Wright at right side

Ada Cecile Granville Wright (c. 1862–1939) was an English suffragette. Her photo on the front page of the Daily Mirror on 19 November 1910 became an iconic image of the suffrage movement.

== Biography ==
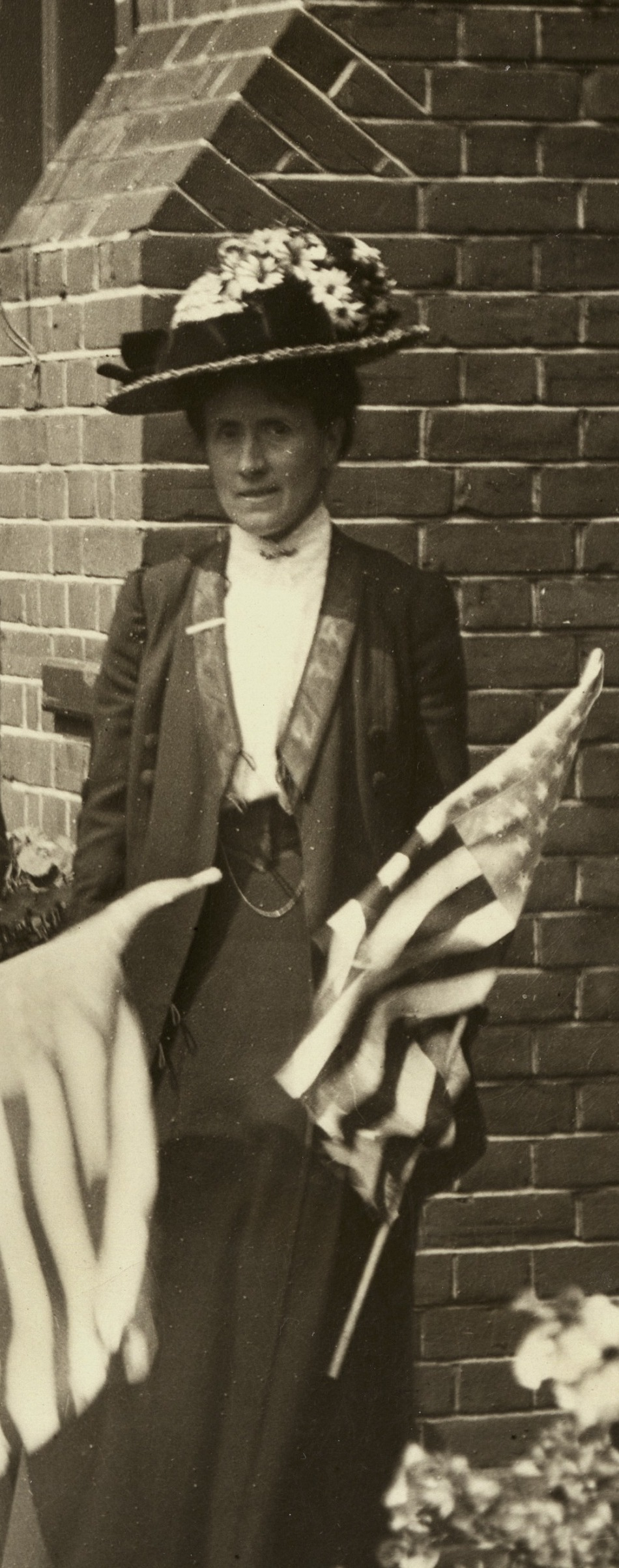
Ada Wright 1911

Ada Cecile Granville Wright was born in Granville, France, around 1862.

She attended the Slade School of Fine Art and University College, London, where she followed the physics lectures by Margaret Whelpdale (half-sister of Octavia Hill) and English lectures by Edward Aveling.

For a short time she taught in Bonn, and then back in England, she wanted to take up social work, but was prevented in doing so by her father. She noted inequality of women and "wished [she] had been born a boy". After travelling widely with her family, she was able to follow her previous desire and take up social work in 1885, when she settled in Sidmouth. She worked in a settlement house with a niece of Elizabeth Barrett Browning. She joined the local women's suffrage society.

After leaving Sidmouth, Wright worked at the West London Mission with Maude Stanley, running a club for working girls in Greek Street, Soho. Later she was a probationer nurse at the London Hospital.

== Role in suffrage movement ==
After moving back home in Sidmouth to take care of her aging father, she further moved to Bournemouth and joined the local branch of the National Union of Women's Suffrage Societies.

In March 1907 she was with the Women's Parliament in Caxton Hall and was imprisoned for two weeks. Before then she had been impressed by Annie Kenney and Christabel Pankhurst and gave up NUWSS as "being ineffective for making the question of justice to women a living force" and sent her own savings (£12; £1,248 in 2025) to Mrs Pankhurst. Whilst in prison she resolved to dedicate herself to engaging in a range of activism for the WSPU.

In October 1908 she was involved in the attempt to "rush" the House of Commons and was imprisoned for a month. In June 1909 she was a deputy to the House of Commons and was arrested for throwing two stones through the window of a government office in Whitehall and imprisoned for one month. Refusing to be treated as a criminal, she went on a six-days hunger strike and was released.

On 18 November 1910, the "Black Friday", at the age of fifty, Wright took part at the Women's Suffrage demonstration in Parliament Square, and as she ran towards the Strangers' Entrance of the House of Commons, was struck by a policeman and fell to the ground. Wright is said to be the woman in the famous picture which was on the front page of the Daily Mirror on 19 November and became an iconic image of the suffrage movement, the reporter said she had been at seven demonstrations and "never known the police so violent" and had "pushed [her] as roughly as he would have done any man" but saying he wouldn't "give [her] the satisfaction of arresting [her]".

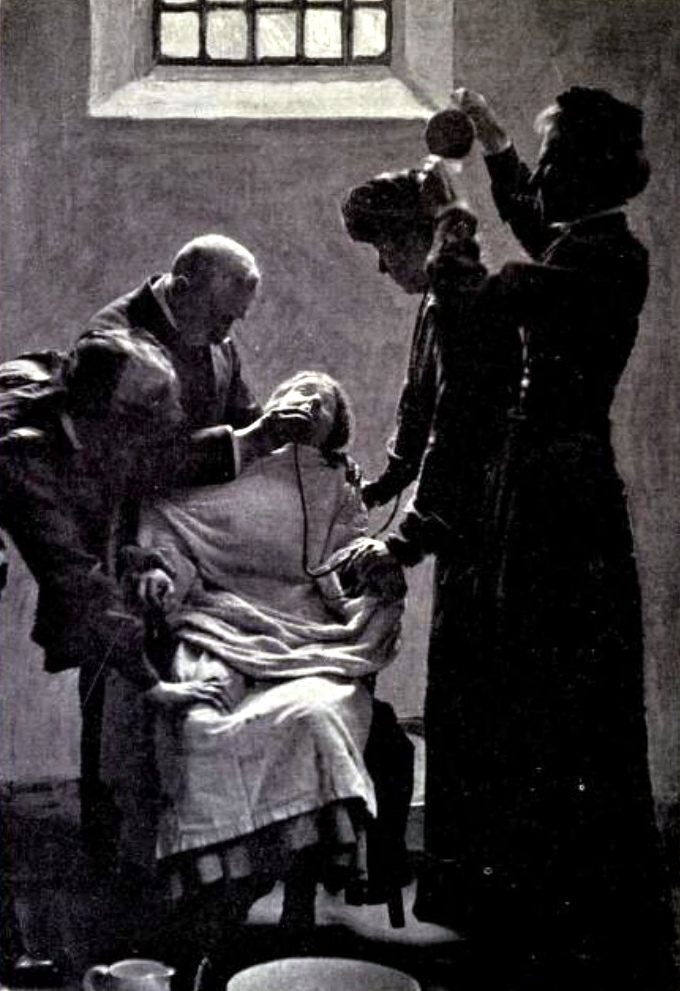
Force feeding (suffragettes)

In November 1911 she was arrested for breaking Cabinet Minister 'Loulou" Harcourt's window during the protest against the Conciliation Bill and imprisoned for 14 days, she remarked that the night before such activism "the suspense always tries me terribly". In March 1912, together with Charlotte Marsh, she took part at the window-smashing campaign in the Strand and was sentenced to six months' imprisonment in Aylesbury Prison, because of previous convictions.

In prison she went on hunger strike and described "trembling from head to foot and weak and dizzy", being forcibly fed with a feeding tube "rammed down her throat by clumsy and unskilled fingers", thinking she would suffocate, and being left partly conscious on the floor the first time, a torture that was repeated twice daily for 10 days. Wright remembered the wardresses were distressed at helping the doctor in this "gruesome task". After calling off the hunger strike when suffragettes were going to be treated as political prisoners, she stopped eating again in protest at the length of sentence. Maud Arncliffe-Sennett wrote during Wright's force-feeding that it was a national disgrace. Due to the effect on her health, Wright was released after serving four of the six months sentence and went to recuperate in Switzerland with Charlie Marsh. In 1914 she helped Emmeline Pankhurst to escape Mouse Castle and was arrested and imprisoned for 14 days. In May 1914 she went with Pankhurst to the King at Buckingham Palace, she was arrested with sixty-one others "after much buffeting and rough handling", spent a night in prison, and was sentenced to one month in prison or a fine, which was paid without her consent by her sister, fearing for her health.

Wright was given a Hunger Strike Medal by the WSPU.

In 1914, together with Alice Green, Emmeline Pethick-Lawrence, Constance Lytton, Rose Lamartine Yates, she raised the money necessary to pay the fare for Kitty Marion to emigrate to the United States, to avoid the anti-German sentiment rising in the United Kingdom. Wright volunteered in the war effort for the Post Office, grooming horses, working in canteens, and driving ambulances.

Ada Wright was a pallbearer at Pankhurst's funeral and worked in social work in the 1920s and was involved in the Suffragette Fellowship.

== Death and legacy ==
In the year before the Second World War she served as an Air Raid Patrol Warden. She died in Finchley in 1939, and was described as "one of those quiet women whose gently and calm manner hides a courageous and indomitable nature of unexpected depths".

In her will Wright left a picture to her friend, the actress Adeline Bourne (1873–1965), £100 (equivalent to £5,651 in 2025) to Evie Hamill (sister of Cicely Hamilton), £150 (£8,477 in 2025) to Nina Boyle, £200 (£11,303 in 2025) to Flora Drummond to carry on with the welfare of animals campaign, £500 (£28,257 in 2025) to Rosamund Massy, £1,600 to Christabel Pankhurst (£90,422 in 2025).
