= Campden Hill Square =

Garden square in London, England

Coordinates: 51.507465°N 0.202077°W

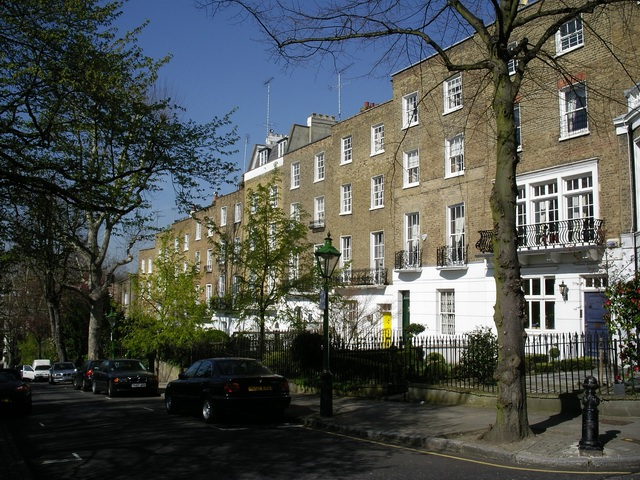
Houses in Campden Hill Square

Campden Hill Square is a garden square in the Holland Park area of London. Campden Hill, and therefore the square, are named after Campden House which no longer exists.

== History and description ==
Developer Joshua Flesher Hanson, best known as a proponent of the building of Regency Square in Brighton in 1813, acquired the site of Campden Hill Square in 1823. Hanson Square was possibly an early intended name for the square, but it was certainly known as Notting Hill Square by 1826 and remained so until 1893. The 1826 plans for the square were submitted by George Edward Valentine. The plans involved a square surrounded on three sides by houses, sloping towards the north where its bounded by Holland Park Avenue. The buildings were laid out over the following years but in 1830 Hanson withdrew from the development. Despite leaving provision for how the square was to be developed, which Hanson intended as a unified affair, building was carried out piecemeal until 1851. No. 18 on the south was rebuilt between 1887 and 1888 and therefore particularly sticks out from the surrounding houses. Nos. 24–28 suffered bomb damage during the Second World War and were subsequently rebuilt. A number of other houses have been altered.

=== IRA bombing ===
In 1975, an IRA car bomb attack directed at Hugh Fraser, who was at the time hosting Caroline Kennedy was carried out in the square. The bomb killed passerby Gordon Hamilton Fairley, a resident of the square, who was walking his dog. The Balcombe Street Gang were subsequently convicted of Fairley's murder. Brian Keenan, a senior IRA commander, was also apprehended and stood trial at the Old Bailey in London in June 1980 accused of organising the IRA's bombing campaign in England and being implicated in the deaths of eight people, including Fairley. Keenan was sentenced to 18 years' imprisonment after being found guilty on 25 June 1980.

== Notable Residents ==
Former residents of the square include:

- Evelyn Underhill, writer and theologian
- John McDouall Stuart, explorer
- Normal MacColl, editor of The Athenaeum
- Siegfried Sassoon, war poet
- Charles Langbridge Morgan and his wife Hilda Vaughan both novelists
- Antonia Fraser, biographer and novelist, successively with husbands Hugh Fraser and Harold Pinter
