= George Black (shipbuilder) =

Canadian politician and businessman (1778-1854)

- Born: January 17, 1778
- Died: 19 May 1854 (aged 76)
- Occupations: politician and businessman

George Albert Black (January 17, 1778 – 19 May 1854) was a Canadian politician and businessman and an important shipbuilder in Quebec during the earlier part of the 19th century.

== Shipbuilding career ==
Black was a ship's carpenter by 1817 and appears to have gone into business as a shipbuilder in 1819. Between then and 1846, he built at least 54 vessels for a total registered tonnage of 23,645. His shipyard was located at Cape Cove (Anse du Cap), below the monument to James Wolfe on the Plains of Abraham, and specialized in full-rigged vessels and, to a lesser extent, barques. Nearly all of his ships were awarded the highest rating, A1, by Lloyd's register of shipping.
