= Edward Brackenbury =

British Army officer (died 1864)

Sir Edward Brackenbury DL JP (10 March 1785 – 1 June 1864) was a British Army officer.

Brackenbury was born on 10 March 1785 at Raithby by Spilsby, Lincolnshire, the second son of Richard Brackenbury of Aswardby, by his wife, Janetta, daughter of George Gunn of Edinburgh. He was a direct descendant from Sir Robert Brackenbury, lieutenant of the Tower of London in the time of Richard III.

Having entered the army as an ensign in the 61st Foot in 1803, and become a lieutenant on 8 December in the same year. He served in Sicily, in Calabria, at Scylla Castle and at Gibraltar, 1807–1808, and in the Peninsula from 1809 to the end of the war in 1814. At the battle of Salamanca he took a piece of artillery from the enemy, guarded by four soldiers, close to their retiring column, without any near or immediate support, and in many other important engagements conducted himself with distinguished valour. As a reward for his numerous services he received the war medal with nine clasps.

On 22 July 1812, he was promoted to a Captaincy, and after the conclusion of the war was attached to the Portuguese and Spanish army from 25 October 1814 to 25 December 1816, when he was placed on half-pay. He was promoted major in the Army in 1817 and purchased a majority in the 28th Foot on 1 November 1827. On 31 January 1828 he was again placed on half-pay. His foreign services were further recognised by his being made a knight of the Portuguese order of the Tower and Sword in 1824, a knight of the Spanish order of St. Ferdinand, and a commander of the Portuguese order of St. Bento d'Avis.

Brackenbury, who was knighted by the king at Windsor Castle on 26 August 1836, was a magistrate and Deputy Lieutenant for Lincolnshire. He was promoted lieutenant-colonel in the Army on 10 January 1837 while serving in the 33rd Foot, and purchased a Majority in the 69th Foot in 1846. The following year he sold his commission.

He was twice married: first, on 9 June 1827, to Maria, daughter of the Rev. Edward Bromhead of Reepham near Lincoln, and, secondly, in March 1847, to Eleanor, daughter of Addison Fenwick of Bishopwearmouth then in County Durham, and widow of W. Brown Clark of Belford Hall in Northumberland. She died on 13 May 1862 in London. Brackenbury died on 1 June 1864 at Skendleby Hall, Skendleby, Lincolnshire.
