= 1926 New Year Honours =

British royal recognitions

The New Year Honours 1926 were appointments by King George V to various orders and honours to reward and highlight good works by members of the British Empire. They were published on 29 December 1925.

The recipients of honours are displayed here as they were styled before their new honour, and arranged by honour, with classes (Knight, Knight Grand Cross, etc.) and then divisions (Military, Civil, etc.) as appropriate.

== British Empire ==
=== Viscount ===
- The Right Honourable Edgar, Baron D'Abernon, GCMG, His Majesty's Ambassador at Berlin since 1920.
- The Right Honourable Andrew Graham, Baron Dunedin, GCVO, a Lord of Appeal in Ordinary; Keeper of the Great Seal of the Principality of Scotland.

=== Baron ===
- The Right Honourable Geoffrey Henry, Baron Oranmore and Browne, KP.
- The Right Honourable Sir Ernest Murray Pollock, Bart, KBE, KC, Master of the Rolls, Justice of the Peace for Hertfordshire, Member of Parliament for Warwick and Leamington, 1910–1923.

=== Privy Councillor ===
- Lieutenant-Colonel the Honourable Francis Stanley Jackson, DL, MP, Chairman of the Conservative and Unionist Party since March 1923. Financial Secretary to the War Office, 1922. Member of Parliament for the Howdenshire Division of Yorkshire since 1915.
- Colonel George Richard Lane-Fox, JP, DL, MP, Parliamentary Secretary for Mines, Department of Board of Trade. Charity Commissioner 1921. Member of Parliament for the Barkston Ash Division of the West Riding of Yorkshire since 1906.
- Charles, Baron Bledisloe, KBE, Parliamentary Secretary to the Board of Agriculture and Fisheries since November 1924.
- Major the Honourable Joseph Gordon Coates, MC, Prime Minister of the Dominion of New Zealand.
- The Honourable Sir Francis Henry Dillon Bell, GCMG, KC, Attorney-General, Minister of External Affairs, and Leader of the Legislative Council, Dominion of New Zealand.

=== Baronet ===
- William Waters Butler, FCS, FR.Met.Soc. For valuable political and philanthropic services in Birmingham. Member of Council of Birmingham University.
- Sidney Hutchinson Byass, JP, DL. For political, public and philanthropic services. President of the Mid-Glamorgan Conservative Association. High Sheriff of the County. Mayor of Aberavon for three consecutive years.
- Sir Clement Kinloch-Cooke, KBE, MP, Member of Parliament for Devonport, January 1910; for Devonport Division, December 1918, and November 1922, and for Cardiff East since 1924. Founded in 1905 the Central Emigration Board of which he is chairman, and has done yeoman work in connection with emigration. For political and public services.
- The Right Honourable Sir Henry Craik, KCB, MA, LLD, MP, Member of Parliament for Glasgow and Aberdeen Universities, 1906, and for the Scottish Universities since December 1918. Secretary of the Scottish Education Department, 1885–1904. For political and public services.
- Herbert Gibson, President of the Law Society which celebrates its centenary this year.
- Sir Robert Jones, KBE, CB, FRCS, President, Association of Surgeons of Great Britain and Ireland.
- Edmund Russborough Turton, JP, DL, MP, Member of Parliament for Thirsk and Malton Division since February 1915. Chairman of the North Riding Quarter Sessions since 1898. Member of the Speaker's Conference on Electoral Reform 1916–17; the Royal Commission on London Government, 1921; and of the Royal Commission on Local Government, 1923.

=== Knight Bachelor ===
- Thomas Hudson Beare, FRSE, MInstCE, MInstME, DL, Regius Professor of Engineering and Dean of the Faculty of Science, University of Edinburgh
- Robert Alfred Bolam, OBE, MD, FRCP, LLD, chairman of the council, British Medical Association.
- Albert Herbert Brewer, Mus.Doc, Hon. RAM, FRCO, Organist and Master of Choristers at Gloucester Cathedral since 1897. Conductor of the Three Choirs Festivals.
- George Washington Browne, PRSA, President of the Royal Scottish Academy.
- Edmund Fleming Bushby. For public and political services in Wrexham. A County Councillor for Denbighshire.
- Joseph Herbert Cunliffe, KC, MP. Member of Parliament for Bolton since December 1923. H.M. Attorney General for the Duchy of Lancaster since 1921. Member of the General Council of the Bar and of the Council of Legal Education.
- Stanford Edwin Downing, Secretary of the Ecclesiastical Commission.
- Professor John Bretland Farmer, DSc, LLD (Edin), FRS, Member of Advisory Council to Department of Scientific and Industrial Research. Governor of Imperial College of Tropical Agriculture, Trinidad.
- Patrick Johnston Ford, MP. Member of Parliament for North Edinburgh, April 1920-24 and since October 1924. A Lord Commissioner of the Treasury and Scottish Whip, 1923.
- James Ellison Haggas, JP. For public and charitable services in Keighley. For 27 years chairman and President of the Keighley Conservative and Unionist Association.
- Alderman Hugh Hall, DCL, JP. For political and public services in Oxford. Has been associated with public work in Oxford since 1875. Chairman of Oxford City Conservative Association since 1917.
- William Edward Hart, OBE, Town Clerk of Sheffield.
- Alfred James Hawkey, JP. For public and political services. Vice-chairman of Epping Conservative Association. Chairman of Woodford Urban District Council for ten years.
- Bertram Hornsby, CBE, Governor of the National Bank of Egypt.
- Thomas Raffles Hughes, KC, Chairman of the General Council of the Bar.
- Major Aston McNeill Cooper Cooper-Key, CB, Chief Inspector of Explosives, Home Office.
- Charles Marstan, KC, JP. For eighteen years President of West Wolverhampton Conservative Association. Past President of the Cycle and Motor Cycle Manufacturers' and Traders' Union and of the Cycle Engineers' Institute. For political and public services.
- William Meff, Ex-Lord Provost of Aberdeen.
- Matthew Walker Montgomery, Lord Provost of Glasgow since 1923.
- George Edward James Moody. For political and public services. For 30 years a Member of the Cleethorpes Urban District Council of which he has been Chairman eight times. Chairman of the Grimsby Unionist Association.
- Robert John Parr, OBE, Director of the National Society for the Prevention of Cruelty to Children.
- Alderman William George Perring, JP, MP. Member of Parliament for North Paddington since 1918. President of the National Chamber of Trade. Has served on the Paddington Borough Council since its inception.
- William Ramsden, JP, Chairman of the Huddersfield Local Employment Committee. For public services in Huddersfield.
- Alfred Cooper Rawson, MP. Member of Parliament for Brighton since November 1922; Member of London County Council 1913–21; Member of Wandsworth Borough Council 1911–22, and Mayor 1918–19.
- Henry Montagu Rogers, JP, Chairman of the Conservative Party in the Camborne Division for fifteen years. Chairman of the Royal Cornwall Agricultural Association, 1924. For political and public services in Cornwall.
- Julius Sladden, Chairman of the Evesham Conservative and Unionist Association since 1908 and Leader of the Party in Evesham since 1880. Member of the Worcestershire County Council since 1902. For political and public services.
- Captain Oscar Emanuel Warburg, OBE, JP, Chairman of the London County Council. Member of the Paddington Borough Council since 1909. Member of the Paddington Conservative Association since 1909 and vice-president of the Hackney Conservative Association since 1910. For political and public services.
- Alderman George Wright, JP. For 20 years Chairman of the Central Conservative Council for the Ealing Division, and for 38 years chairman and then President of the Acton Conservative Association. For 38 years Member of the Middlesex County Council. For political and public services.

India

- Mr. Justice John Guy Rutledge, KC, Chief Justice of the High Court of Judicature, Rangoon.
- Diwan Bahadur Tinnevelly Nellaiyappa Pillai Sivagnanam Pillai Avargal, Minister for Development, Madras.
- Khan Bahadur Shaikh Ghulam Husain Hidayatallah, Minister for Local Self-Government, Bombay.
- Sardar Bahadur Sardar Sundar Singh Majithia, CIE, Member of the Executive Council, Punjab.
- Mr. Justice William Watkin Phillips, Indian Civil Service, Puisne Judge of the High Court of Judicature, Madras.
- Mr. Justice Charu Chunder Ghose, Puisne Judge of the High Court of Judicature, Calcutta.
- Mr. Justice Saiyid Muhammad Abdul Raoof, Khan Bahadur, Puisne Judge of the High Court of Judicature, Lahore.
- Mr. Justice Louis Stuart, CIE, Indian Civil Service, Chief Judge of the Oudh Chief Court, United Provinces.
- Mr. Justice Benjamin Herbert Heald, VD, Indian Civil Service, Puisne Judge of the High Court of Judicature, Rangoon.
- Frederick Austin Hadow, CVO, Member, Railway Board, Government of India.
- Philip Joseph Hartog, CIE, Vice-Chancellor of the University of Dhaka.
- Lionel Linton Tomkins, CIE, Inspector-General of Police, Punjab.
- Charles Augustus Tegart, CIE, MVO, Commissioner of Police, Calcutta.
- Reginald Arthur Spence, Member of the Legislative Assembly, Director of Messrs. Phipson and Company, Bombay.
- Shankar Madho Chitnavis, ISO, Member of the Legislative Council, and formerly Minister, Central Provinces.
- Lieutenant-Colonel Frank Powell Connor, DSO, FRCS, Indian Medical Service.

Dominions

- Henry Brett, of the City of Auckland, Dominion of New Zealand, formerly Mayor of that City; in recognition of his public services.
- William Brunton, the Right Honourable the Lord Mayor of Melbourne; in recognition of his public services to the State of Victoria.
- The Honourable John William Evans, CMG, lately Speaker of the House of Assembly, State of Tasmania.
- Nicholas Colston Lockyer, CBE, ISO, Chairman of the Australian Imperial Force Canteen Funds Trust, formerly Comptroller-General of the Department of Trade and Customs, Commonwealth of Australia.
- Colonel William Lennon Raws, CBE, Federal President, Associated Chambers of Commerce, Commonwealth of Australia.
- Henry Francis Wigram, formerly Member of the Legislative Council and Mayor of Christchurch, Dominion of New Zealand; in recognition of his public services.

Colonies, Protectorates, Etc.

- Kenneth James Beatty, Chief Justice of Bermuda.
- Chow Shou-son, Unofficial Member of the Legislative Council of Hong Kong.
- Arturo Mercieca, LLD, Chief Justice and President of the Court of Appeal, Island of Malta.
- Alexander Mosley, CMG, formerly President of the Chamber of Commerce and Unofficial Member of the Executive Council of Gibraltar.
- Henry Alfred Alford Nicholls, CMG, MD, lately Principal Medical Officer, Dominica, Leeward Islands.

=== The Most Honourable Order of the Bath ===
==== Knight Grand Cross of the Order of the Bath (GCB) ====
Military Division

Royal Navy

- Admiral Sir Alexander Ludovic Duff, GBE, KCB, KCVO.

Army

- General the Honourable Sir Herbert Alexander Lawrence, KCB, Colonel 17th/21st Lancers, Colonel The Manchester Regiment, Honorary Colonel 6th/7th Battalion (Territorial) The Manchester Regiment, Retired Pay.
- General Frederick Rudolph, Earl of Cavan, KP, GCMG, GCVO, KCB, Colonel Irish Guards, Chief of the Imperial General Staff, The War Office.

Civil Division

- The Right Honourable Sir Edward Frederick Grey Ponsonby, GCVO, KCB. For services rendered to three successive Sovereigns during more than thirty years.

==== Knight Commander of the Order of the Bath (KCB) ====
Military Division

Royal Navy

- Vice-Admiral Sir Lewis Clinton-Baker, KCVO, CB, CBE.
- Surgeon Vice-Admiral Joseph Chambers, CB, CMG, MD.

Army

- Lieutenant-General Sir Herbert Crofton Campbell Uniacke, KCMG, CB.
- Major-General Richard Bannatine-Allason, CB, CMG, Colonel Commandant Royal Artillery, Retired Pay.

Royal Air Force

- Air Vice-Marshal Sir William Geoffrey Hanson Salmond, KCMG, CB, DSO, psc.

Civil Division

- John Lamb, CB, Under Secretary for Scotland.

==== Companion of the Order of the Bath (CB) ====
Military Division

Royal Navy

- Rear-Admiral Richard Grenville Arthur Wellington Stapleton-Cotton, CBE, MVO.
- Rear-Admiral Henry Edgar Grace.
- Captain Bernard St. George Collard, DSO, Royal Navy.
- Paymaster Captain Henshaw Robert Russell, CMG, Royal Navy.

Army

- Colonel George Vawdrey, CMG, CBE, assistant director of Military Transport, Woolwich Arsenal.
- Colonel Arthur Milton Bent, CMG, CBE, Officer in Charge of Records, Exeter.
- Colonel (Temporary Colonel Commandant) Charles Arthur Ker, CMG, CBE, DSO, Colonel, Royal Artillery (Heavy), Southern Command.
- Colonel (Temporary Colonel Commandant) Wallace Duffield Wright, VC, CMG, DSO, Brigade Commander, 8th Infantry Brigade, Southern Command.
- Colonel (Temporary Colonel Commandant) Alexander Rolland, CBE, DSO, Chief Engineer, Southern Command, India.
- Colonel Thomas Nairne Scott Moncrieff Howard, DSO, Brigade Commander, 161st (Essex) Infantry Brigade, Territorial Army.
- Colonel (Temporary Colonel Commandant) Hugh Stephenson Moberly, Indian Army, Brigade Commander, 5th Indian Infantry Brigade, India.
- Colonel (Temporary Colonel Commandant) John Leared Furney, Indian Army, Brigade Commander, 8th Indian Infantry Brigade, India.
- Colonel (Temporary Colonel Commandant) Charles Richard Bradshaw, CBE, Indian Army, Brigade Commander, 17th Indian Infantry Brigade, India.

Civil Division

- Colonel John Brown, CBE, DSO, TD, Territorial Army, Brigade Commander, 162nd (East Midland) Infantry Brigade, Territorial Army.
- Honorary Colonel Thomas Francis, Baron Cottesloe, VD, TD, Buckinghamshire Battalion (Territorial), The Oxfordshire and Buckinghamshire Light Infantry. (Lieutenant-Colonel retired, Territorial Force). Chairman, Small Arms Committee.
- James Young Bell, Assistant Secretary, General Post Office.
- Edward John Harding, CMG, Assistant Under Secretary of State, Dominions Office.
- Alfred William Hurst, Assistant Secretary, H.M. Treasury.
- Miles Wedderbum Lampson, CMG, MVO, Counsellor in the Foreign Office. For services in connection with the Treaty of Locarno.
- William Leitch, Assistant Secretary, H.M. Office of Works.
- Walford Harmood Montague Selby, CVO, Counsellor in the Foreign Office. For services in connection with the Treaty of Locarno.
- Arthur Hamilton Smith, FBA, FSA, Hon. ARIBA, late Keeper of Department of Greek and Roman Antiquities, British Museum.
- Arthur Henry Wood, Assistant Secretary, Board of Education.

=== Order of the Star of India ===
==== Knight Commander of the Order of the Star of India (KCSI) ====
- Lieutenant-Colonel His Highness Maharaja Sri Brajindra Sawai Kishan Singh Bahadur, Maharaja of Bharatpur.
- His Highness Nawab Mahabat Khanji Rasul Khanji, Nawab of Junagadh.
- Sir Basil Phillott Blackett, KCB, Member of the Executive Council of the Governor-General.
- Henry Staveley Lawrence, CSI, Indian Civil Service, Member of the Executive Council, Bombay.

==== Companion of the Order of the Star of India (CSI) ====
- Thomas Emerson, CIE, Indian Civil Service, Commissioner, Bengal.
- Arthur Herbert Ley, CIE, CBE, Indian Civil Service, Secretary to the Government of India in the Department of Industries and Labour.
- Ernest Burdon, CIE, Indian Civil Service, Secretary to the Government of India in the Army Department.
- John Ernest Buttery Hotson, OBE, Indian Civil Service, Chief Secretary to the Government of Bombay.
- Alan William Pim, CIE, Indian Civil Service, Member, Board of Revenue, United Provinces.

=== Order of Saint Michael and Saint George ===
==== Knight Grand Cross of the Order of St Michael and St George (GCMG) ====
- Colonel the Honourable Sir James Allen, KCB, High Commissioner in London for New Zealand.
- Sir Cecil James Barrington Hurst, KC, KCB, KCMG, Legal Adviser to the Foreign Office.

==== Knight Commander of the Order of St Michael and St George (KCMG) ====
- Professor Mungo William MacCallum, LLD, DLitt, Vice-Chancellor of the University of Sydney; in recognition of his services to the Commonwealth of Australia.
- Cecil Clementi, CMG, Governor and Commander-in-Chief of the Colony of Hong Kong.
- William Frederick Gowers, CMG, Governor and Commander-in-Chief of the Uganda Protectorate.
- Henry Hamond Dawson Beaumont, a Minister in His Majesty's Diplomatic Service.
- The Honourable William Augustus Forbes Erskine, MVO, His Majesty's Envoy Extraordinary and Minister Plenipotentiary at Sofia.
- Harry Charles Augustus Eyres, His Majesty's Envoy Extraordinary and Minister Plenipotentiary at Durazzo.
- Lieutenant Colonel George Ernest Schuster, CBE, MC, Financial Secretary to the Sudan Government.

==== Companion of the Order of St Michael and St George (CMG) ====
- Frederick William Furkert, MICE, AMIME, Engineer in Chief and Under Secretary of the Public Works Department, Dominion of New Zealand.
- Victor Gordon, High Commissioner in London for Newfoundland.
- Major Patrick Kirkman Hodgson, OBE. For services as Personal Secretary to the Governor-General of the Dominion of Canada.
- George Ernest Hudson, Chairman of the Tariff Board, Commonwealth of Australia.
- Frank Lidgett McDougall, one of the representatives of the Commonwealth of Australia on the Imperial Economic Committee; in recognition of his services to the Commonwealth.
- Colonel Kinahan Cornwallis, CBE, DSO, Adviser to the Ministry of the Interior, Iraq.
- Harold Baxter Kittermaster, CBE, Secretary to the Administration, Somaliland Protectorate.
- Harry Charles Luke, Colonial Secretary, Sierra Leone.
- William Peel, Resident Councillor, Penang, Straits Settlements.
- Samuel Simpson, Director of Agriculture, Uganda Protectorate.
- Wilfrid Wentworth Woods, Colonial Treasurer, Ceylon.
- John Cecil Sterndale Bennett, MC, a Second Secretary in His Majesty's Diplomatic Service.
- Alexander Gordon Ingram, Commandant of the Alexandria City Police.
- Norman King, His Majesty's Consul-General at Mexico City.
- Lieutenant-Colonel Woodbine Parish, CBE.
- Thomas Wentworth Russell, Commandant of the Cairo City Police.
- George Bailey Sansom, Acting Commercial Counsellor of His Majesty's Embassy at Tokyo.
- The Honourable Thomas Aubrey Spring-Rice, MVO, a First Secretary in His Majesty's Diplomatic Service.

Honorary Companion

- Tungku Ismail, the Tungku Mahkota of Johore, Malay States.

=== Order of the Indian Empire ===
==== Knight Commander of the Order of the Indian Empire (KCIE) ====
- Horatio Norman Bolton, CSI, CIE, Indian Civil Service, Chief Commissioner and Agent to the Governor-General, North-West Frontier Province.
- Sir Moropant Vishwanath Joshi, Member of the Executive Council, Central Provinces.

==== Companion of the Order of the Indian Empire (CIE) ====
- John Richard Donovan Glascott, Agent, Burma Railways, and Port Commissioner, Burma.
- Colonel Stephen Henry Edmund Nicholas, Indian Army, Judge Advocate-General in India.
- Harry Alexander Fanshaw Lindsay, CBE, Indian Civil Service, Indian Trade Commissioner, London.
- Lieutenant-Colonel Archibald Duncan Macpherson, Indian Army, Resident, Western States, Rajputana.
- Kashinath Shriram Jatar, Officiating Commissioner, Chhattisgarh Division, Central Provinces.
- M. R. Ry. Rao Bahadur Vangal Thiruvenkata Krishnama Acharya Avargal, Secretary to the Government of Madras, Law Department.
- Gilbert Wiles, Indian Civil Service, Secretary to the Government of Bombay, Finance Department.
- Sahibzada Abdul Majid Khan, Revenue Secretary and Inspector-General of Police, Rampur State, United Provinces.
- Ernest Rudolph Foy, Chief Engineer and Secretary to the Government of the Punjab, Public Works Department.
- Bernard Abdy Collins, Indian Civil Service, Director of Industries, and Secretary to the Government of Bihar and Orissa, Education Department.
- Richard Roy Maconachie, Indian Civil Service, Foreign and Political Department.
- Percy Hawkins, Chief Engineer to the Government of Madras, Public Works Department (Irrigation).
- Joseph Wilson-Johnston, CBE, Indian Civil Service, Administrator of Nabha.
- Carlton Moss King, Indian Civil Service, Legal Remembrancer to the Government of the United Provinces,
- Herbert William Emerson, CBE, Indian Civil Service, Deputy Commissioner, Punjab.
- Patrick Aloysius Kelly, Commissioner of Police, Bombay.
- Lieutenant-Colonel John Wallace Dick Megaw, MB, Indian Medical Service, Director, School of Tropical Medicine and Hygiene, Calcutta.
- Barthold Schlesinger Kisch, Indian Civil Service, Controller, Local Clearing Office (Enemy Debts).
- Frank David Ascoli, Indian Civil Service, lately Controller of Printing, Stationery, and Stamps.
- Major Bernard Rawdon Reilly, OBE, Indian Army, First Assistant Resident at Aden.
- Hugh Stuart Crosthwaite, Indian Civil Service, Collector of Allahabad.
- Jadu Nath Sarkar, Professor of History, Patna College.
- Percy Hide, Principal, Daly College, Indore.
- Frederick William Sudmersen, Principal, Cotton College, Gauhati, Assam.
- The Reverend Arthur Ernest Brown, Principal, Wesleyan Mission College, Bankura, Superintendent, Wesleyan Mission, Bengal.
- Bamaswami Srinivasa Sarma, Managing Editor and Proprietor of the Amalgamated Newspapers Ltd., Calcutta.
- Major Robert Henry Bott, MB, FRCS, Indian Medical Service.

=== Royal Victorian Order ===
==== Knight Grand Cross of the Royal Victorian Order (GCVO) ====
- The Right Honourable Osbert Cecil, Earl of Sefton.
- Colonel Sir Henry Streatfeild, KCVO, CB, CMG. (Dated 26 November 1925.)

==== Knight Commander of the Royal Victorian Order (KCVO) ====
- Charles Alexander, Lord Carnegie.
- Sir James Balfour Paul, CVO, Lyon King of Arms.

==== Commander of the Royal Victorian Order (CVO) ====
- Sir Hugh Percy Allen.
- Ernest Law, CB.
- Gordon Ambrose de Lisle Lee, CB, Norroy King of Arms.
- Colonel Arthur Edward Erskine, DSO.
- Major Edward Seymour, DSO, MVO, OBE. (Dated 26 November 1925.)
- Frederic Jeune Willans, MVO. (Dated 24 November 1925.)
- Alfred Edwin Dumphie.
- The Reverend Prebendary Lancelot Jefferson Percival.

==== Member of the Royal Victorian Order, 4th class (MVO) ====
- Christopher Lloyd, MVO (5th Class), MBE.
- Arthur Clement Beck, MVO (5th Class). (Dated 25 November 1925.)
- John Wilson Paterson, MBE.
- Alan Frederick Lascelles, MC.
- Harry Russell Maynard.
- David Charles Medley.
- Sydney Hugo Nicholson.
- George Arthur Ponsonby.
- William Barclay Squire.

==== Member of the Royal Victorian Order, 5th class (MVO) ====
- Lieutenant Henry Claude Warrington Eastman, Royal Horse Artillery. (Dated 28 November 1925.)
- Reginald Harry Short.

=== Order of the British Empire ===
==== Dame Grand Cross of the Order of the British Empire (GBE) ====
Civil Division

- Rachel Cecily, Baroness Forster. For service in Australia during the period of her husband's Governor Generalship.

=== Order of the Companions of Honour (CH) ===
- The Reverend Prebendary Wilson Carlile, Hon. DD, Prebendary of St. Paul's Cathedral 1906. Founder and Honorary Chief Secretary Church Army since 1882.

=== Kaisar-i-Hind Medal ===
First Class, for Public Services in India.

- The Right Reverend Eyre Chatterton, DD, Lord Bishop of Nagpur.
- William Leonard Stampe, Officiating Superintending Engineer, Public Works Department, United Provinces.
- Evelyn Agnes Barton, Mysore.
- Jessie Carleton, MD, American Presbyterian Mission, Ambala.
- Jessie Matilda Allyn, MD, Canadian Baptist Telugu Mission, Pithapuram, Madras.
- M. B. By. Tiruchendurai Vaidyanatha Seshagiri Ayyar Avargal, chairman, Executive Committee, Madras Central Flood Relief Fund.
- Sherin Hormuzshaw Commissariat, Superintendent, Medical Aid to Women, United Provinces.
- Charlotte Leighton Houlton, MD.

=== King's Police Medal (KPM) ===
England & Wales

- Lieutenant-Colonel Arthur Faulconer Poulton, CBE, Chief Constable, Berkshire Constabulary.
- Lieutenant-Colonel Pulteney Malcolm, MVO, DSO, Chief Constable, Cheshire Constabulary.
- William Imber, Chief Constable, Coventry City Police.
- Albert Gooding, Superintendent, Metropolitan Police.
- Arthur Hammett, Superintendent, Metropolitan Police.
- Arthur William Hopkins, Chief Superintendent and Deputy Chief Constable, Gloucestershire Constabulary.
- Samuel Jones, Superintendent and Deputy Chief Constable, Carmarthenshire Constabulary.
- James Fulcher, Superintendent and Deputy Chief Constable, Shropshire Constabulary.
- James Tough, MBE, Superintendent and Deputy Chief Constable, Northumberland Constabulary.
- Joseph Jackson, Superintendent, Lancashire Constabulary.
- Ernest Thompson, Superintendent, City of London Police.
- John William Lister, Superintendent, Leeds City Police.
- Arthur David Penrice, Superintendent, Birmingham City Police.
- Albert Ward, Divisional Detective Inspector, Metropolitan Police.
- James Bellinger, Detective Inspector, Metropolitan Police.
- Robert Ellis, Detective Sergeant, Metropolitan Police.
- William Parker Peter, Sergeant, Lancashire Constabulary.
- James Hedges, Sergeant, Metropolitan Police.
- Richard Bonner, Constable, Metropolitan Police.
- Albert Gravett, Constable, Metropolitan Police.
- William Hopkins, Constable, Metropolitan Police.
- Thomas Mead, Constable, Metropolitan Police.
- Charles Bates, Constable, Northamptonshire Constabulary.

Fire Brigades

- William Hollington, Senior Superintendent, London Fire Brigade.
- Howard Beckwith, Superintendent, Stockport Police Fire Brigade.
- William Wilmshurst, Fireman, London Fire Brigade.

Scotland

- William Gordon, Chief Constable of the County of Dumfries.
- James Christie, Chief Constable of the Burgh of Greenock.
- Gavin Mowat, Lieutenant, Edinburgh City Police.
- Robert Fraser, MBE, Superintendent and Deputy Chief Constable, Midlothian Constabulary.
- Robert Barrowman, Constable, Ayrshire Constabulary.

Northern Ireland

- Peter John Gilroy, Sergeant, Royal Ulster Constabulary.
- Alexander Lockhart, Head Constable, Royal Ulster Constabulary.

India

- Appavu Vanna Muthayya Pillai, Acting Inspector, Madras Police.
- Nuggehalli Bamanuja Ayyangar, Acting District Superintendent, Madras Police.
- Bao Sahib Subbaraya Venkatesa Ayyar, Temporary Deputy Superintendent, Madras Police.
- Sankaralinga Kone, 1st Grade Head Constable and Acting Sub-Inspector, Madras Police.
- Id Mohamed, Head Constable, Bombay Police.
- Frank Norman Johnson, Sergeant, Bombay Police.
- Bapujirao Babajirao, Head Constable, Bombay Police.
- Kenneth Charles Bushton, Deputy Inspector-General, Bombay Police.
- Nirmal Kanti Bay, Officiating Assistant Sub-Inspector, Bengal Police.
- Sheo Saran Singh, Constable, Calcutta Police.
- Upendra Chandra Ghosh, Officiating Sub-Inspector, Bengal Police.
- John Elliot Armstrong, OBE, Deputy Inspector-General, Bengal Police.
- Jatindra Nath Sinha, Probationary Inspector, Bengal Police.
- Reginald Norman Marsh-Smith, Superintendent, United Provinces Police.
- Bakar Husain, Constable, United Provinces Police.
- Abdul Hai, Sub-Inspector, United Provinces Police.
- Yusuf Husain, Sub-Inspector, United Provinces Police.
- James Alexander Scott, Superintendent, Punjab Police.
- Qamar-ud-din, Sub-Inspector, Punjab Police.
- Balwant Singh, Sub-Inspector, Punjab Police.
- Wasti Ram, Head Constable, Punjab Police.
- Clyne Garden Stewart, District Superintendent, Burma Police.
- Udnyalak Ram, Inspector, Burma Police.
- Robert Scarth Farquhar Macrae, CIE, CBE, Deputy Inspector-General, Bihar and Orissa Police.
- Joseph Edward Warn, Sergeant-Major, Bihar and Orissa Police.
- Jatadhari Prashad, Sub-Inspector, Bihar and Orissa Police.
- Johan Horo, Constable, Bihar and Orissa Police.
- Gaya Singh, Constable, Bihar and Orissa Police.
- Trevor Latham, Deputy Inspector-General, Centra] Provinces Police.
- Harold James Vickers, Superintendent, North West Frontier Province Police.
- Khan Bahadur Ahmed Khan, retired Deputy Superintendent, North West Frontier Province Police.
- Rao Sahib Pattamada Devayya, Deputy Superintendent, Coorg Police.
- Khan Behadur Malcolm Batanji Kothawala, MBE, Inspector General, Kajputana Police.
- Khan Bahadur Behramsha Fardunji Davar, Deputy Superintendent, Western India States Agency Police.
- Sowar Buldan Sing Mesdan Sing, Constable, Western India States Agency Police.
- Amar Singh, Subedar Major, Andaman and Nicobar Military Police.
- William Henry Albert Webster, Commissioner of Police, Rangoon.

Australia

- Charles Ian McLean, Detective Acting Sergeant, Queensland Police Force.
- Charles Burnett Bright, Acting Sergeant, Queensland Police Force.
- Thomas Challenger, Water Bailiff, Tasmanian Police.

Union of South Africa

- Schalk Richard Brink, Senior Inspector, South African Police.

Colonies, Protectorates & Mandated Territories

- William George Gerrard, Chief Inspector, Hong Kong Police Force.
- Major Clement Hampden King, Commissioner of Police, Sierra Leone.
- Captain Frederick Roberts, Superintendent, Uganda Police.
- Edward George Orrett, Inspector, Jamaica Constabulary.
- Daniel Obadiah Humphrey, Sergeant-Major, Jamaica Constabulary.
- Joseph Murphy, Staff Sergeant-Major, Jamaica Constabulary.
- David Samuel Gayle, Detective Sergeant-Major, Jamaica Constabulary.
- James Michael O'Connor, Second Class Inspector, Jamaica Constabulary.
- George Brewer, Director of Criminal Investigation Department, Gold Coast Police Force.
- Walter Allan Callender, Assistant Commissioner of Police, Gold Coast.

==== Bar to the King's Police Medal ====
India

- Michael A. O'Gorman, Officiating District Superintendent, Bombay Police.

Colonies, Protectorates & Mandated Territories

- Owen Franklin Wright, First Class Inspector, Jamaica Constabulary.

=== Air Force Cross (AFC) ===
- Squadron Leader Arthur Coningham, DSO, MC, DFC.
- Flight Lieutenant Leonard Graeme Maxton.
- Flying Officer Basil Edward Embry.

=== Air Force Medal (AFM) ===
- 327067 Leading Aircraftman (Acting Corporal) Frank Stone.
- 11838 Corporal (Acting Sergeant) Henry Grant.
- 87366 Sergeant (Pilot) Thomas William James Nash.

=== Promotions ===
==== Royal Navy ====
Dated 31 December 1925.

Commander to Captain

- John H. Young.
- Montague G. B. Legge, DSO.
- John H. K. Clegg, OBE.
- Claude C. Dobson, VC, DSO.
- The Honourable Edmund R. Drummond, MVO.
- Cyril G. Sedgwick.
- William J. Whitworth, DSO.
- Frank Elliott, OBE.
- John B. Glencross, DSO.
- Bertram C. Watson, DSO.

Lieutenant-Commander to Commander

- Arthur E. Buckland, DSO, DSC.
- Charles E. Morgan, DSO.
- Richard Harter.
- Hamilton E. Snepp.
- Charles H. Champness.
- Edward G. Stanley, DSC.
- Herbert M. Hughes.
- Cuthbert Coppinger, DSC.
- Heneage C. Legge, DSC.
- Kenneth Edwards, DSC.
- Hugh F. Curry, DSC.
- Edward C. Thornton, DSC.
- Francis Howard, DSC.
- Charles M. R. Schwerdt.
- Richard C. F. Ryan.
- William G. Tennant, MVO.
- Augustine W. S. Agar, VC, DSO.
- Douglas B. Fisher, OBE.
- Clement Moody.
- Guy D'Oyly-Hughes, DSO, DSC.

Engineer Commander to Engineer Captain

- John H. Hocken.
- William S. Mann, OBE.
- John C. Matters.
- Robert Beeman, CMG.
- Ralph Berry.
- Sydney P. Start.
- John B. Pulliblank, DSO, OBE.

Lieutenant-Commander (E) to Commander (E)

- Guy F. B. Ottley.
- Cuthbert W. S. Gibson.
- Brian L. G. Sebastian.

Engineer Lieutenant-Commander to Engineer Commander

- Percy W. Warwick.
- Reginald Stansmore.
- Harry G. Marshall.
- Harold S. Warren.
- Ralph P. Janion.
- Harold F. du M. Hunt.
- Cecil R. Hoare.
- Casper V. Baker.

Surgeon Commander to Surgeon Captain

- Robert W. B. Hall, OBE.

Paymaster Commander to Paymaster Captain

- Gerald Solfleet.

==== Royal Naval Reserve ====
Commander to Captain

- Charles G. Matheson, DSO, RD.
- Edward A. Singeisen, DSC, RD.
- Robert B. Irving, OBE, RD.

Lieutenant-Commander to Commander

- Douglas Davenport-Jones, RD.
- Robert L. F. Hubbard, RD.
- James Marshall, RD.
- Ernest K. Irving, DSC, RD
- Harry B. Reece, RD.
- Andrew T. Motif, RD.
- Reginald J. Finlow, RD.

==== Royal Naval Volunteer Reserve ====
Lieutenant-Commander to Commander

- Eric Elgood, VD.

Surgeon Lieutenant-Commander to Surgeon Commander

- Alfred E. W. Hird.

==== Royal Air Force ====
From 1 January 1926.

General Duties Branch
Wing Commander to Group Captain

- Richard Charles Montagu Pink, CBE. In recognition of his distinguished services in the Field in Waziristan.
- Edmund Digby Maxwell Robertson, DFC.

Squadron Leader to Wing Commander

- Frederick Henry Unwin. OBE.
- Vivian Gaskell-Blackburn, DSC, AFC.
- Henry John Francis Hunter, MC.
- Arthur Clinton Maund, CBE, DSO.
- Douglas Harries, AFC.
- Arthur Claud Wright, AFC.
- John Oliver Archer, CBE.
- Charles William Nutting, OBE, DSC.
- Robert Leckie, DSO, DSC, DFC.
- Walter Gerald Paul Young, OBE.

Flight Lieutenant to Squadron Leader

- Henry Cockerell, OBE.
- Francis William Trott, OBE, MC.
- Alan Fitzroy Somerset-Leeke.
- Frederick George Sherriff, MC.
- John Farquhar Gordon, DFC.
- Charles Beauvoir Dalison, AFC.
- Richard Spencer Lucy, AFC.
- William Samuel Caster, MC.
- Wilfred Henry Dunn, DSC.
- Charles Langstoh Scott, DSC.
- Hugh Henry MacLeod Fraser.
- Dirk Cloete, MC, AFC.
- Albert Durston, AFC.
- Meredith Thomas, DFC, AFC.
- Trevor Edward Salt, AFC.

Flying Officer to Flight Lieutenant

- John Christian Barraclough.
- George Henry Russell, DFC.
- Horace Gramshaw Payne Ovenden.
- Thomas Humble.
- Hilton Oscar Brown, MM.
- George Robert Oliver.
- Gilbert Latham Ormerod.
- Richard Vaughan Bramwell-Davis (Lieutenant, Royal Fleet Auxiliary).
- Denis Holcombe Carey.
- John Duncan.
- Christopher Neil Hope Bilney.
- William Whitefield McConnachie.
- Charles Dudley Palmer.
- Alfred Edwin Lindon, MBE.
- Albert James Ernest Broomfield, DFC.
- Thomas Rose, DFC.
- Charles Leslie Cox.
- Pat Murgatroyd.
- Ernest Caizley Usher.
- Vincent Percy Feather.
- Eyare King Blenkinsop.
- Charlton Hallawell.
- Robert John Hayne Holland.
- Robert Lyle McKindrick Barbour, DFC.
- Lawrence Fleming Pendred, DFC.
- Charles John Sims, DFC.
- John Lawrence Kirby.
- Frederick Frank Garraway.
- Owen Wilson Clapp.
- Campbell Alexander Hoy, MC.
- Sidney Herbert Ware.
- Frank George Gibbons, DFC.
- Cecil Arthur Bouchier, DFC.
- Harold John Saker.
- Reginald Morville Davy.
- Frank George Brockman.
- Ernest Henry Attwood.
- William James Millen.
- Edmund Henry Searle.
- Eric Brewerton, DFC.

Stores Branch
Flight Lieutenant to Squadron Leader

- Nevill Ross Fuller.
- Walter Langston Shaw, MBE.

Flying Officer to Flight Lieutenant

- George Thomas Stroud, MBE.
- Ernest William Lawrence.
- John Clifford Shakeshaft.
- Frank Edwin Shersby.
- Robert Craig.

Stores Branch (Supplementary List)
Flying Officer to Flight Lieutenant

- Reginald Vivian Robinson, OBE.

Accountant Branch
Squadron Leader to Wing Commander

- Herbert George Jones.

Flying Officer to Flight Lieutenant

- James Frederick Robert Bales-White.
- Herbert Charles Frederick Ellis.

Medical Branch
Squadron Leader to Wing Commander

- Frank Cuninghame Cowtan.

Flight Lieutenant to honorary Squadron Leader

- George Stephen Ware, MB.
- Edmond Francis Neville Currey.
- Charles Anderson Meaden.
- Frederick Ernest Wilson.

==== Princess Mary's Royal Air Force Nursing Service ====
Sister to Acting-Senior Sister

- Janet Macleod, ARRC.

Acting-Sister to Sister

- Louisa Learmouth Mackenzie.
- Mary Anne MacVicar.
- Elizabeth Spensley, ARRC.
- Ellen Kate Griffin.

Staff Nurse to Sister

- Elizabeth Ann Risdon.
- Gertrude Swanston.
- Jessie Warnock Walker.

Staff Nurse to Acting-Sister

- Alice Mary Hardwicke.
- Pauline Kipping Pearce.
- Ellen Jane Stuart.
- Mary McCallum.
