= Jamini Sen =

Early female Indian doctor

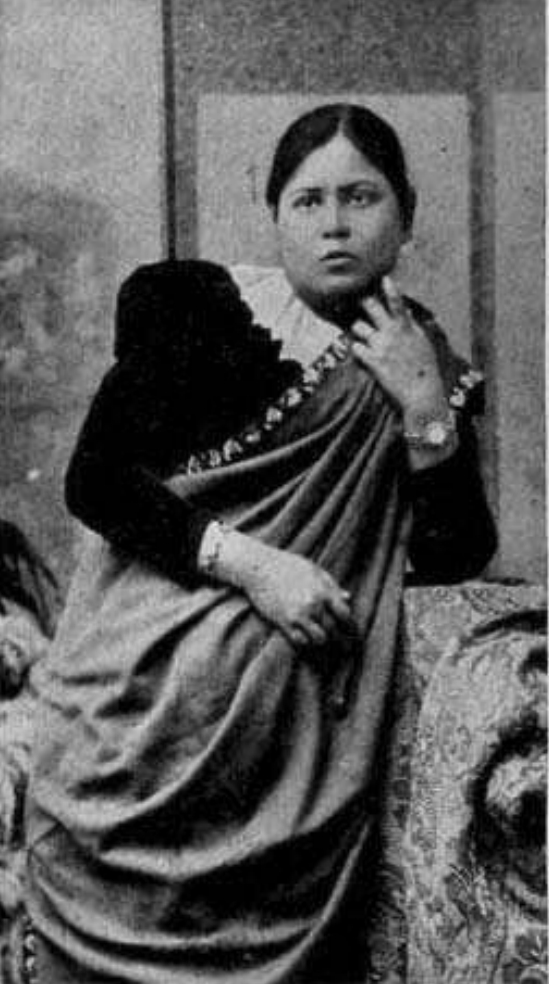
- Born: June 20, 1871; Barisal, Bengal Presidency, British India
- Died: 22 January 1933 (aged 61); Calcutta, Bengal Presidency, British India
- Education: Calcutta Medical College
- Occupation: Doctor
- Known for: First female Fellow of the Royal Faculty of Physicians and Surgeons of Glasgow
- Relatives: Kamini Roy (sister); Sudhir Kumar Sen (brother); Ipsita Roy Chakraverti (grand-niece)

Jamini Sen (20 June 1871 – 1932) was a Bengali physician and the first female Fellow of the Royal Faculty of Physicians and Surgeons of Glasgow. She was one of the first women in the British Raj to enter the medical profession.

== Early life and education ==
Sen was born on 20 June 1871 in Barisal (now in Bangladesh) into a Brahmo family. She was one of seven children, her sister Kamini Roy was the first woman honours graduate in British India and a noted feminist. Sen attended Bethune College in Kolkata, earning a First Arts (FA) degree in 1890. She later enrolled in the Calcutta Medical College and graduated with a Licentiate of Medicine and Surgery in 1897.

== Medical career ==
After completing her studies, Sen moved to Nepal in 1899, where she worked as the physician for the royal family and headed the Kathmandu Zenana Hospital for a decade.

In 1911, Sen received a scholarship from the Dufferin Fund to pursue further studies in the United Kingdom. She earned a medical license from the Rotunda Hospital in Dublin and, in 1912, became the first woman to be admitted as a Fellow of the Royal College of Physicians and Surgeons of Glasgow. Later in her life Sen further trained in Berlin and at the London School of Tropical Medicine.

== Later life ==
Upon returning to India, Sen joined the Women's Medical Service, working at Countess of Dufferin Fund funded hospitals in Agra, Shimla, Shikarpur, and Akola. Sen recounted how the numbers of Indian women seeking treatment increased in numbers due to their trust of a familiar person treating them. She later served as the head of the Baldeodas Maternity Home in Kolkata. Sen never married and died in 1932.

== Legacy ==
A portrait of Sen was unveiled by the Royal College of Physicians and Surgeons of Glasgow in 2024. In 2026, her great-niece Deepta Roy Chakraverti, daughter of Ipsita Roy Chakraverti, published the biography "Daktarin Jamini Sen: The Life of One of British India’s First Women Doctors" (Penguin Random House India), which draws on family archives, letters, diaries, journals, and oral histories to reconstruct Sen's pioneering career as one of the earliest Indian women physicians.
