= Bielby (surname) =

Bielby is a surname. Notable people with the surname include:

- Elizabeth Bielby, British physician and missionary
- Jonathan Bielby (born 1944), British organist
- Matt Bielby (born 1965), British magazine editor
- Paul Bielby (born 1956), British footballer
- Richard Bielby (born 1947), British cricketer
- William T. Bielby, American sociologist
