= Florence Dissent =

Anglo-Indian medical practitioner and surgeon

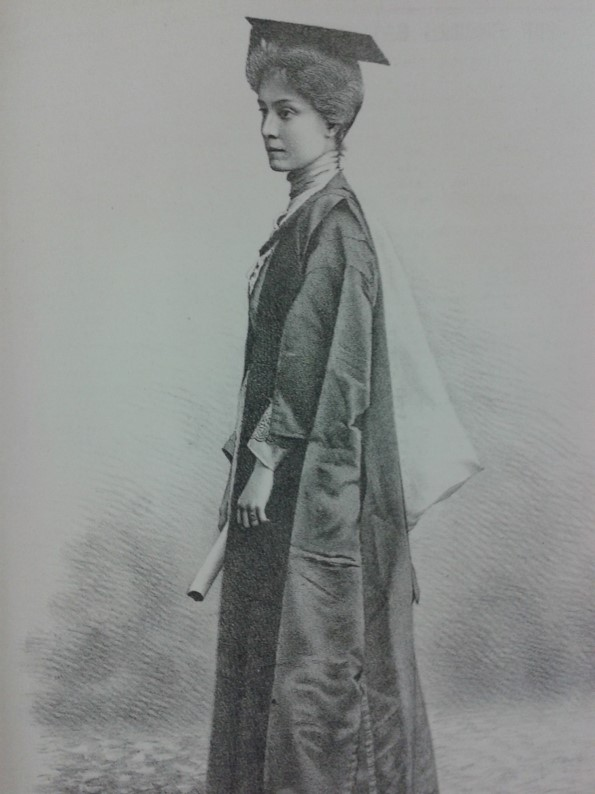
- Image of Florence Dissent from Indian Medical Record.
- Born: Florence Hope Dissent; 9 July 1869; Calcutta, India
- Died: 3 March 1930 (aged 60)

Florence Hope Dissent-Barnes (9 July 1869 – 3 March 1930) was an Anglo-Indian medical practitioner and surgeon. Dissent was among the first female Indian doctors to practice medicine.

== Early life and education ==
Dissent was born in Calcutta, India, to Francis Rice and Mary Lavinia Dissent. She was educated at home until the age of eight. She then became a day-pupil at Loreto Convent, where she stayed until the age of 14.

Dissent received her doctor of medicine (MD) from Brussels. In April 1894, she was one of the 48 of 77 candidates who passed the final examinations to be admitted the Triple Qualification from the Scottish medical and surgical colleges: the Royal College of Physicians of Edinburgh, the Royal College of Surgeons of Edinburgh, and Royal College of Physicians and Surgeons of Glasgow.

== Medical career ==
After qualifying in medicine, Dissent worked at the Dufferin Hospital in Allahabad under a Dr. McConaghey. The Dufferin staff, in 1892, consisted of Dissent, two male European surgeons, ten nurses, a midwife, a dresser, a compounder, and a matron. Dissent was attached to the Dufferin Fund and later the Women's Medical Service for India.

Dissent's work was published at least three times during her career. In 1891, the Indian Medical Gazette published a gynecological case study from her practice at Allahabad. In that study, Dissent describes two cases of uterine polyps in her patients, detailing the medical history, symptoms, and treatments of each patient. In 1892, Dissent's notes on the Dufferin Hospital were published in Indian Medical Gazette. Here, it was noted that Dissent herself performed 30 major operations from January to August 1892, ranging from cataract operations to obstetrics and gynecology and plastics. In the same time, Dufferin Hospital saw more than 100 minor cases per month. In these publications, Dissent's title is 'Miss' because she practiced as a surgeon. Throughout her career, Florence published under both Miss Dissent and Mrs. Dissent Barnes.

In 1895, the Indian Medical Record published a full-page biographical sketch of Dissent. She was held up as a role model to encourage women to enter medicine. The article implored Indian woman to become medical practitioners particularly for the sake of treating the zenanas, who could not be seen by male doctors.

By 1912, Dissent had married and moved to Bhopal, India. In February 1912, Dissent, now known as Mrs. Dissent Barnes, was visited by Sidney and Beatrice Webb during their travels. The Webbs noted the prevalence of syphilis in the area and were taken to see Dissent's hospital, which treated only women and children. Dissent had also been charged by the Begum of Bhopal, Sultan Jahan, to train the native midwives. These midwives (dais) were prevented from practicing if they had not taken a course by Dissent or if they had been suspended by her.

In 1922, Dissent was employed to the Government of Bombay to inquire into the maternity conditions of industrial women workers. A year later, her report on the subject was published in the Bombay Labour Gazette.

== Personal life ==
Sometime between Florence's return to India from England in December 1894 and 1899, Florence married James Adolphus Fitz Ernest Barnes (8 June 1864 – 10 November 1907), the son of Joseph James Barnes (1835-1873) and Elizabeth Charlotte (née Rossiter) Peacock (1839-1896). Florence was James’ second wife. His first, Lilian Esther Green (1866–1892), whom he married in Lahore in 1887, had died aged 26.

Florence and James had at least three children, Eric Cecil (b. 29 January 1899), Charles and Percival. Charles and Percival are both recorded a being born and baptized on 1 April 1902.

Florence died 3 March 1930.

Percival Barnes married Rose Ellen Jackson at the London Tabernacle on Saturday, 8 August 1953. The couple first met at an international convention of Jehovah's Witnesses in 1935. His death was registered in Mid Warwickshire in the county of Warwickshire, in February 1987.
