= Governor Lawrence =

Governor Lawrence may refer to:

- Charles Lawrence (British Army officer) (1709–1760), Governor of Nova Scotia from 1753 to 1760
- David L. Lawrence (1889–1966), Governor of Pennsylvania
- Edmund Wickham Lawrence (born 1932), Governor-General of St. Kitts and Nevis
- Elisha Lawrence (1746–1799), Acting Governor of New Jersey
- Henry Staveley Lawrence (1870–1949), Acting Governor of Bombay from 1926 to 1928
- John Lawrence, 1st Baron Lawrence (1811–1879), Governor-General of India from 1864 to 1869
- Thomas Lawrence (Governor of Maryland) (1645–1714), Royal Governor of Maryland
