= Daktarin Jamini Sen =

2026 biography by Deepta Roy Chakraverti

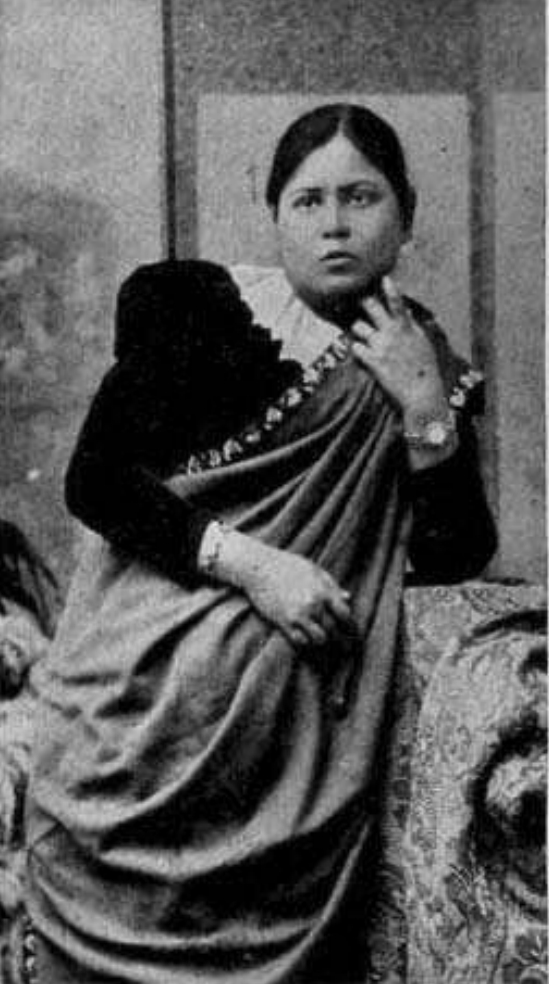
- Image of Dr. Jamini Sen
- Author: Deepta Roy Chakraverti
- Original title: Daktarin Jamini Sen: The Life of One of British India's First Women Doctors
- Language: English
- Genre: Biography, Non-fiction
- Publisher: Ebury Press (Penguin Random House India)
- Publication date: March 2026
- Publication place: India
- Pages: 304
- ISBN: 978-0143475460

Daktarin Jamini Sen: The Life of One of British India's First Women Doctors is a 2026 non-fiction biographical book written by Indian author and lawyer Deepta Roy Chakraverti. Published by Ebury Press, an imprint of Penguin Random House India, the book chronicles the life, medical career, and challenges of Dr. Jamini Sen (1871–1933), one of the earliest female medical practitioners in British India and the first woman to be elected a Fellow of the Royal Faculty of Physicians and Surgeons of Glasgow.

The biography details her journey from colonial Bengal to the royal court of Nepal, highlighting her contributions to introducing modern medicine into highly conservative, patriarchal spaces.

== Background and conception ==
The book was written by Jamini Sen's great-niece, Deepta Roy Chakraverti (daughter of author Ipsita Roy Chakraverti and a descendant of Brahmo reformer Keshub Chunder Sen). Chakraverti noted in the book's prologue that the biography was born out of a sense of frustration that a pioneering figure like Dr. Jamini Sen had been largely forgotten by mainstream history.

== Reception ==
The book received positive critical reception for its historical depth and accessible storytelling.

The Borderless Journal praised the book for "reclaiming the forgotten history of a pioneer," noting that it successfully balances institutional medical history with human vulnerability. The biography features a foreword written by Professor Hany Eteiba, the President of the Royal College of Physicians and Surgeons of Glasgow, providing institutional recognition of Sen's global medical legacy. In March 2026, the book was selected as the "Book of the Month" by the eShe Book Club for Women's History Month.

== See also ==
- Kadambini Ganguly
- Anandi Gopal Joshi
- Women in medicine
