= Wallace Eyres =

England international rugby union player

- Full name: Walter Charles Townsend Eyres
- Born: 17 February 1895 Barton Regis, England
- Died: 16 September 1965 (aged 70) London, England
- Notable relative: Harry Charles Augustus Eyres (father)

Rugby union career
- Position: No. 8
International career
Years	Team	Apps	(Points)
1927	England	1	(0)

Walter Charles Townsend Eyres (17 February 1895 – 16 September 1965) was an English international rugby union player of the 1920s.

Born in Barton Regis, Eyres was the son of diplomat Harry Charles Augustus Eyres.

Eyres captained the Navy XV in 1924 and gained his solitary England cap as a back row forward in a win over Ireland at Twickenham during the 1927 Five Nations Championship. He was unavailable for selection in the seasons that followed as his military service took him overseas.

== See also ==
- List of England national rugby union players
