= Kamini Roy =

Bengali writer and feminist (1864–1933)

- কামিনী রায়
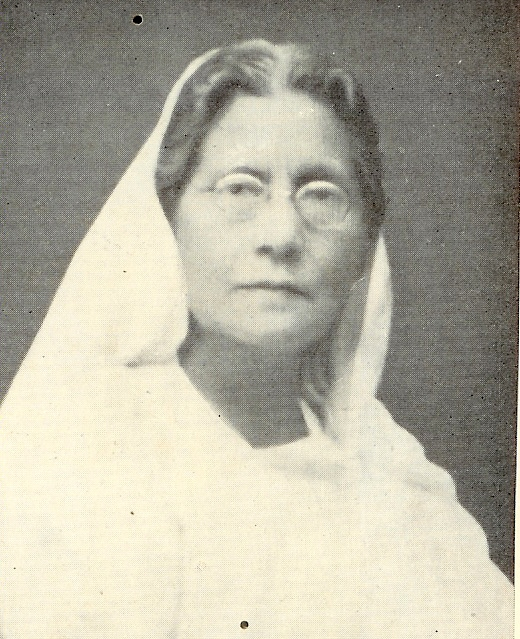
- Born: 12 October 1864; Basanda, Jhalokati, Bengal Presidency, British India
- Died: 27 September 1933 (aged 68); Hazaribagh, Bihar and Orissa Province, British India
- Education: Bethune College; University of Calcutta
- Occupations: Poet, scholar
- Spouse: Kedarnath Roy
- Relatives: Ipsita Roy Chakraverti (grand-niece)
- Family: Jamini Sen (sister) Sudhir Kumar Sen (brother)

Kamini Roy (12 October 1864 – 27 September 1933) was a Bengali poet, social worker and feminist in British India. She was the first woman honours graduate in British India.

== Early life ==
Born on 12 October 1864 in the village of Basunda, then in Bakerganj District of Bengal Presidency and now in Jhalokati District of Bangladesh, Roy joined Bethune School in 1883. One of the first girls to attend school in British India, she earned a Bachelor of Arts degree with Sanskrit honours from Bethune College of the University of Calcutta in 1886 and started teaching there in the same year. Kadambini Ganguly, the country's second female honours graduate, attended the same institution in a class three years senior to Roy.

Nisith Chandra Sen, her brother, was a renowned barrister in the Calcutta High Court, and later the Mayor of Calcutta while her sister Jamini Sen was the house physician of the Nepalese royal family and the first female Fellow of the Royal College of Physicians and Surgeons of Glasgow. In 1894, she married Kedarnath Roy.

== Writing and feminism ==
Bethune School and College will take just pride in Kamini Roy (1864–1933), the first woman lyricist who began composing from 1880 and published her Alo Chhaya in 1889 which created a stir in the literary world as much by its rare sensibilities as by the profundity of woman's self-realisation. Kamini Roy worked with her pen for nearly fifty years and witnessed the emergence of a new generation of womanhood enriching the social, artistic and literary life of Bengal through their original creations.

— Kalidas Nag in Introduction to the Bethune School and College Centenary Volume, 1949

She picked up the cue for feminism from a fellow student of Bethune School, Abala Bose. Speaking to a girls' school in Calcutta, Roy said that, as Bharati Ray later paraphrased it, "the aim of women's education was to contribute to their all-round development and fulfillment of their potential".

In a Bengali essay titled The Fruit of the Tree of Knowledge she wrote,

The male desire to rule is the primary, if not the only, stumbling block to women's enlightenment ... They are extremely suspicious of women's emancipation. Why? The same old fear – 'Lest they become like us'.

In 1921, she was one of the leaders, along with Kumudini Mitra (Basu) and Mrinalini Sen, of the Bangiya Nari Samaj, an organization formed to fight for woman's suffrage. The Bengal Legislative Council granted limited suffrage to women in 1925, allowing Bengali women to exercise their right for the first time in the 1926 Indian general election. She was a member of the Female Labour Investigation Commission (1922–23).

== Honors and laurels ==
Roy supported younger writers and poets, including Sufia Kamal, who she visited in 1923. She was president of the Bengali Literary Conference in 1930 and vice-president of the Bangiya Sahitya Parishad in 1932–33.

Calcutta University honoured her with the Jagattarini Gold Medal.

On 12 October 2019, Google commemorated Roy with a Google Doodle on her 155th birth anniversary. The accompanying write up started with her quote, "Why should a woman be confined to home and denied her rightful place in society?"

== Works ==
Selected works include:

- Mahasweta, Pundorik
- Pouraniki
- Dwip O Dhup
- Jibon Pathey
- Nirmalya
- Malya O Nirmalya
- Ashok Sangeet
- Gunjan (Children's book)
- Balika Sikkhar Adarsha (Essays)
