= Apothecary to the Household at Sandringham =

Position in British Royal Household

Apothecary to the Household at Sandringham is an officer of the Medical Household of the Royal Household of the Sovereign of the United Kingdom. He is paid a small salary.

== List of apothecaries ==
- Alan Reeve Manby 1901
- Sir Frederic Jeune Willans 1924–1949
- JLB Ansell c. 1953 – c. 1964
- Hugh Ford c. 1967 – c. 1991
- Ian Campbell c.1992 – 2007
