= Frederic Willans =

British physician (1884–1949)

Sir Frederic Jeune Willans (1884 – 26/27 January 1949) was an English doctor and member of the British royal family's Medical Household. After an education in Durham and London he established a practice in Sandringham, Norfolk. During the First World War, Willans served for a year as an officer in the Royal Army Medical Corps before returning to Norfolk. He was appointed Surgeon-Apothecary to the Household at Sandringham in 1924 and was also surgeon-apothecary to Queen Alexandra. Willans attended the death of Alexandra in 1925 and of King George V in 1936. He remained in the role at Sandringham under Kings Edward VIII and George VI, until his own death.

== Early life and career ==
Willans was born in Much Hadham, Hertfordshire, in 1884 and was the son of Dr William Blundell Willans. He was educated at Framlingham College before studying medicine at the University of Durham and London Hospital. He passed the Conjoint qualification in 1910 and soon after established a doctors practice in Sandringham, Norfolk. In 1916 he married Wynefred Manby in Sandringham. His wife was the daughter of Sir Alan Reeve Manby, Apothecary to the Household at Sandringham. Willans and his wife lived at West Newton House, a short distance from the royal estate at Sandringham.

During the First World War he joined the Royal Army Medical Corps as a lieutenant on 1 June 1917. His younger brother, Captain Alan Jeune Willans of the 18th battalion King's Royal Rifle Corps, was killed in action fighting against the German spring offensive at Bapaume on 24 March 1918. Willans's father had also died during the war, in 1915. Willans relinquished his commission on 28 May 1918 and returned to his practice at Sandringham, where he remained for the rest of his career. Willans was appointed a member 4th class (now known as lieutenant, with the post nominals LVO) of the Royal Victorian Order on 3 February 1923, admittance to the order is at the sole discretion of the monarch, at this time George V.

== Surgeon-Apothecary to the Household at Sandringham ==
Willans was appointed Surgeon–Apothecary to the Household at Sandringham in 1924, in succession to his father-in-law, and also served as surgeon–apothecary to Queen Alexandra, the queen mother. In the latter role he attended Alexandra's deathbed and, with Thomas Horder, signed the official notice of her death on 20 November 1925. In the 1926 New Year Honours he was appointed a commander of the Royal Victorian Order and in the 1933 New Year Honours he became a knight commander.

Willans attended King George V at Sandringham House during his last illness in January 1936 and signed bulletins advising of the king's condition. It was Willans that summoned Cosmo Gordon Lang, the Archbishop of Canterbury, to the king's side to attend his final moments on the night of 20 January. Willans, with Stanley Hewett (Apothecary to the Household) and Bertrand Dawson, 1st Viscount Dawson of Penn (Physician to the King), signed the official notice of George V's death on 20 January 1936. The three doctors walked alongside each other in the procession of George V's coffin from his lying in state at Westminster Hall to Paddington station and from Windsor railway station to St George's Chapel for his interment.

Willans remained Surgeon–Apothecary to the Household at Sandringham for George's successor, Edward VIII, until his abdication later that year, and to George VI. He died at his home in Sandringham on 26 or 27 January 1949, aged 65. He left £7,115 in his will (equivalent to £317,518 in 2023). Willans was succeeded as Surgeon–Apothecary to the Household at Sandringham by James Lawrence Bunting Ansell.
