= Ipsita Roy Chakraverti =

Indian Wiccan priestess

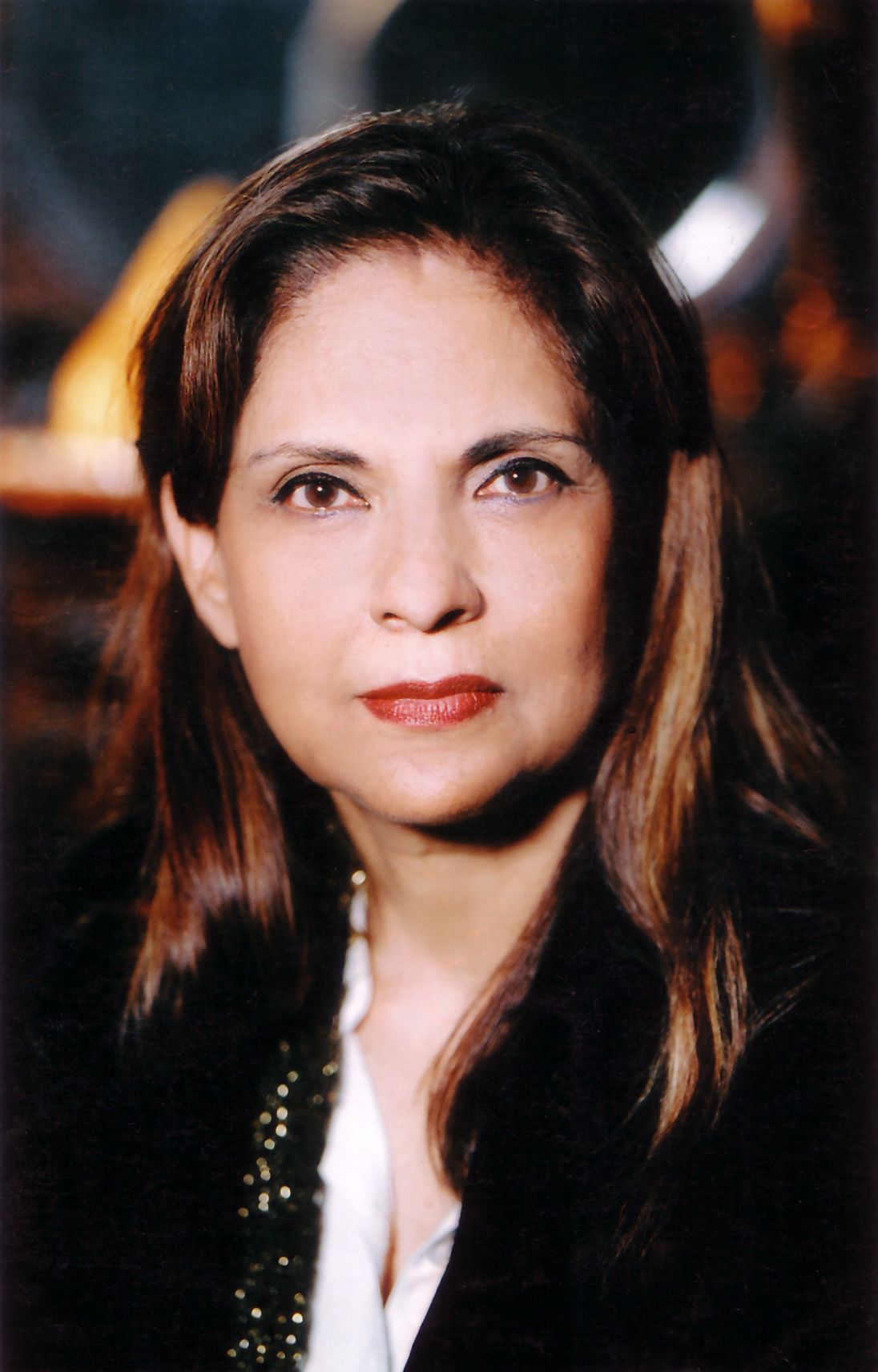

High Priestess of Wicca
- Incumbent
- Assumed office 1986

Personal details
- Born: 3 November 1950 (age 75) Kolkata, West Bengal, India
- Relations: Jamini Sen, Kamini Roy (grand-aunts)
- Children: Deepta Roy Chakraverti (daughter)
- Parent(s): Debabrata Chakraverti (father); Roma Sen (mother)

Ipsita Roy Chakraverti (Bengali pronunciation: [ipʃita rae̯ t͡ʃɔkroboɾti]; born Ipsita Chakraverti; 3 November 1950) is a Wiccan priestess and religious leader based in India. Born into an elite family in India with a diplomat for a father and royalty for mother, Chakraverti spent her early years in Canada and the US where her father was stationed. There, she was allowed to join a select group of women studying ancient cultures of the world and the old ways. Chakraverti studied with them for three years and finally chose Wicca as her religion. After coming back to India and getting married, Chakraverti declared herself as a witch in 1986. Amidst the backlash that followed her declaration, Chakraverti explained to the media the Neo Pagan ways of Wicca and its healing power.

Chakraverti started administering Wiccan ways of healing to the people of India, including traveling to remote villages and teaching the Wiccan way to the female population, several of whom were often accused of black magic and "witchcraft" by male folk, and murdered. In 1998, Chakraverti campaigned as an Indian National Congress candidate for the Parliament of India in the Hooghly district, but was not elected. She released her autobiography Beloved Witch in 2003. A second book titled Sacred Evil: Encounters With the Unknown was released in 2006, and it chronicled nine case studies during her life as a Wiccan healer and explained why those events happened. Both books received positive critical acclaim.

The book, Sacred Evil was made into a motion picture by Sahara One Pictures. Titled Sacred Evil – A True Story, the film starred Bollywood actress Sarika playing Chakraverti. The film was a commercial disappointment but received mixed reviews. Chakraverti started the Wiccan Brigade, a platform for those who wanted to study Wicca. Later, Bengali TV channel ETV Bangla, created two tele-serials based on Chakraverti's life and her experience with the paranormal. Chakraverti, who believes that Wicca is the first feminist movement in history, has been credited with throwing new light on the taboo subject of witchcraft in India, and the rest of the world.

== Early life and education ==
=== 1943–1972: Early life and introduction to Wicca ===
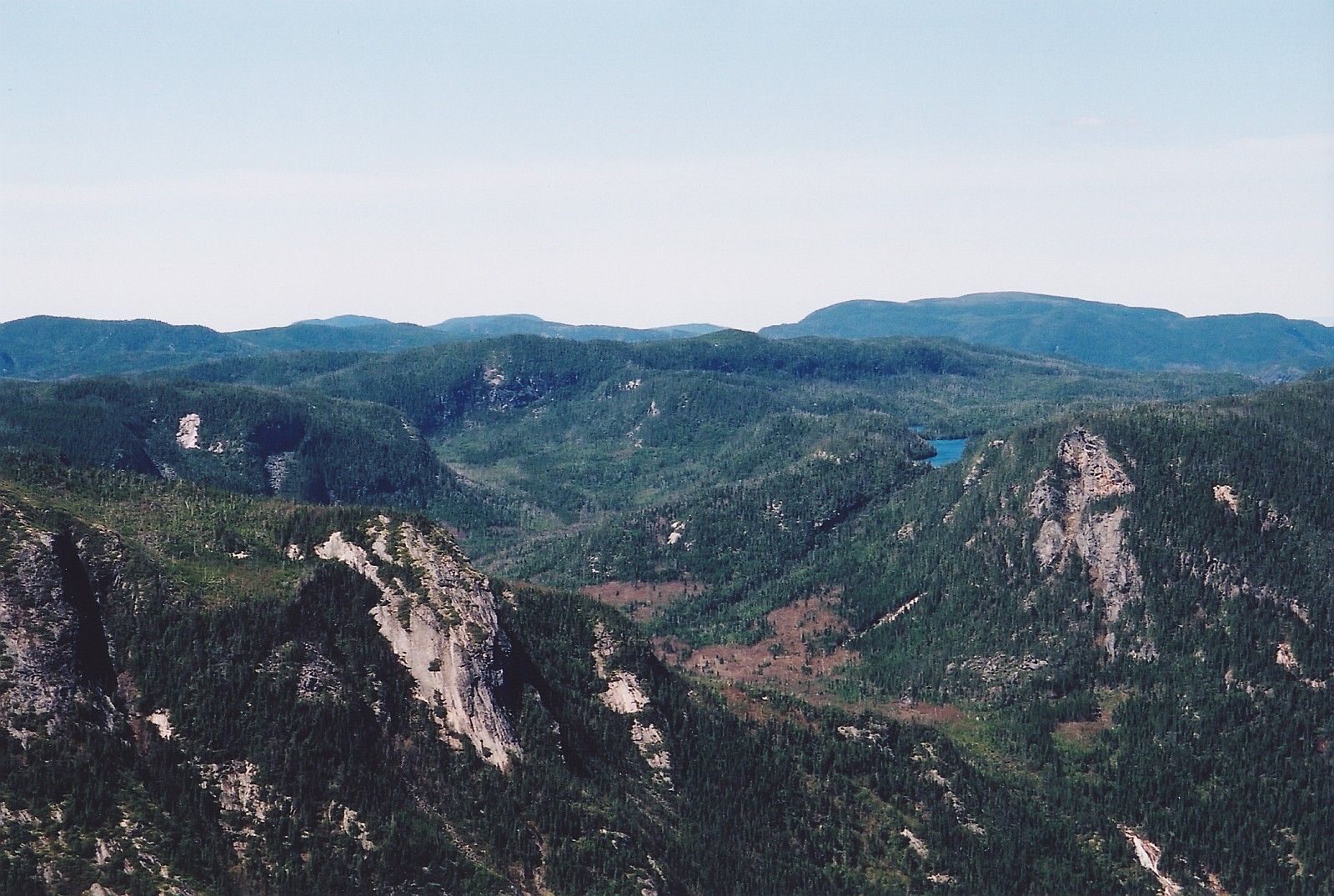
The Laurentian Mountains, where Chakraverti studied Wicca, in a chalet atop the mountains.

Chakraverti was born on 3 November 1950, to diplomat Debabrata Chakraverti, and Roma Sen, daughter of Sovana Sen. Through her maternal lineage, Chakraverti is a descendant of the family of Brahmo reformer Keshub Chunder Sen, who was her great-great-great-granduncle through his sister Chuna. She is a first cousin three times removed of Suniti Devi, Maharani of Cooch Behar, and Sucharu Devi, Maharani of Mayurbhanj, and was also a grand-niece of the Bengali poets and scholars Kamini Roy and Jamini Sen. Chakraverti spent much of her early life in Montreal, Canada, where her father was stationed. He was a representative from India to the Council of ICAO. An only child, she shared her father's passion for reading and devoured books on Indian mysticism and traditions partly because people at Montreal were always asking questions about India. In 1965, while on vacation in the Laurentian Mountains, Chakraverti was invited to an all woman's party by one of her mother's friends, Carlotta. There, she was introduced to the Society for the Study of Ancient Cultures and Civilizations, founded by Carlotta. The group studied ancient texts, long-forgotten customs and the mystical way of life. Chakraverti was selected to join the group, through a process of initiation, and enrolled for a course with them. For the next five years, she stayed in a chalet on the mountains and studied ancient cultures and their long-forgotten rituals with eleven other women, with Carlotta as their teacher. Alcohol, close friendship or anything that distracted them from the prescribed hours of study, solitude and meditation, were taboo. Practical training in witchcraft was the only way; it included learning varied techniques of self-development and understanding the significance of ancient chants, movements, symbols, gestures, invoking energy from the elements, and training in the use of the apparatus integral to the craft. Chakraverti later commented, "It started as an academic curiosity. [...] Wicca includes both scientific facts and old lore. We studied Carl Jung and Friedrich Nietzsche because Wicca means studying various layers of the human mind." In 1972, near the completion of their course, Chakraverti, along with two other women were asked to choose between Way of Tao, Wicca and Kabbalah as their practiced craft; Chakraverti chose Wicca. She later commented that ancient goddesses like Isis, Artemis, Hecate, Kali and Freya, played an important role in deciding her future in Wicca.

=== 1975–1980: Finishing Wicca study, return to India and marriage ===
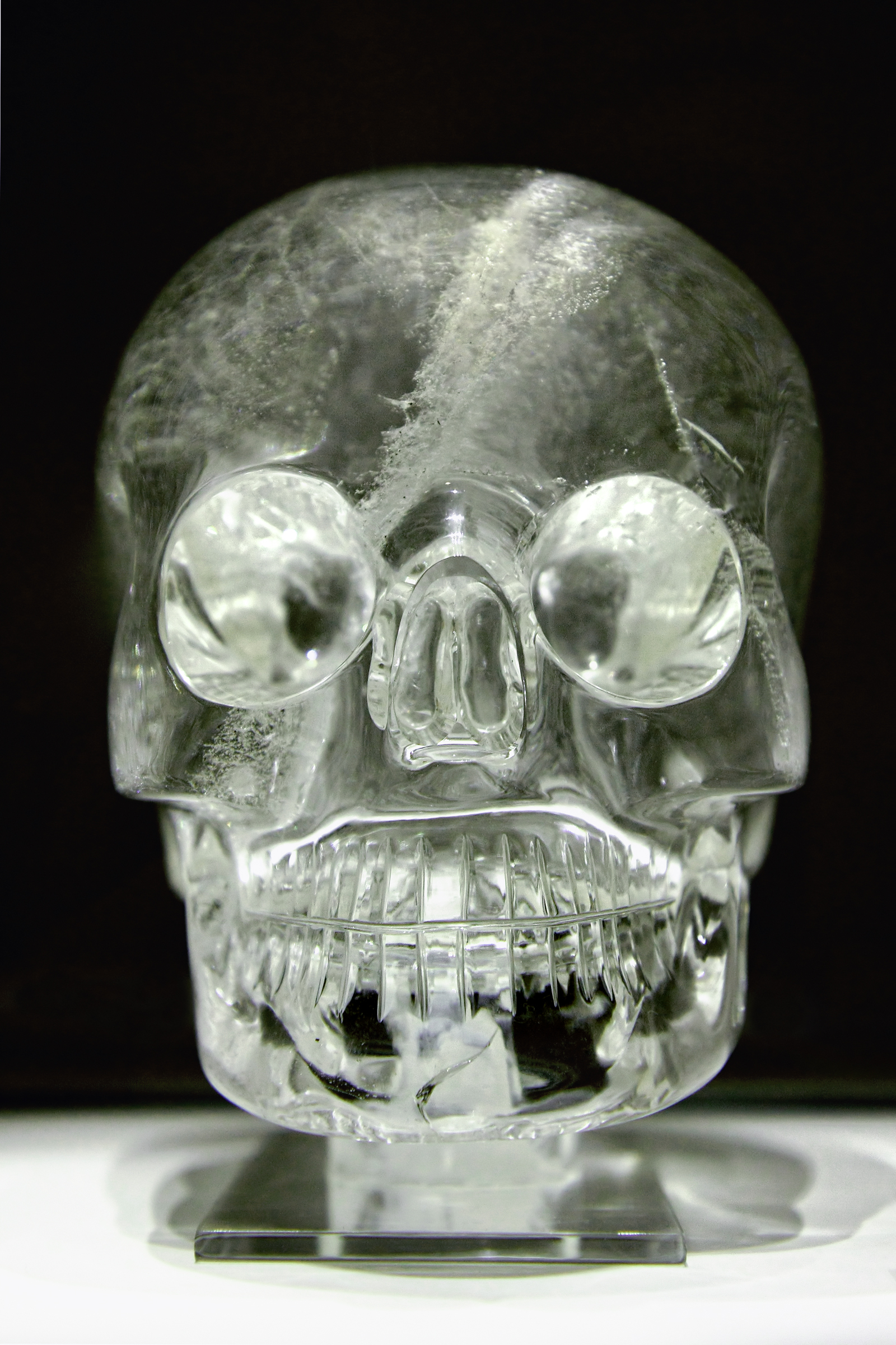
A crystal skull, similar to the one that Chakraverti received from Carlotta when she finished studying Wicca.

While studying in the chalet, Chakraverti came across a number of prophecies left by a fifteenth-century Wiccan, Luciana, who was brought to trial for practicing her craft, but managed to escape to a castle on the Rhine. Chakraverti translated the scrolls and believed that she was the reincarnation of Luciana. She commented in her book Beloved Witch,

"Even though Wicca does not believe in fortune telling or divination, Luciana left a few quatrains like Nostradamus, prophesying about generations to come. I was the one who sat at a chalet monastery in the Laurentians years ago and translated them from an ancient dialect to English. I knew I had to. That was my purpose. For I was Luciana returned. To take revenge for the wrongs she had suffered, to vindicate all women who are battered and bruised as witches in India till today. I have a purpose – I know that. Through the eyes of Luciana I see this world.

I am She – I rise with the storm
I was killed – now I am born
On the winds of revenge
Blood, lust and greed, I will avenge.

At the end of her study, Carlotta gave each new initiate witch certain implements: symbolic gifts of Mother Goddesses who are worshipped by Wiccans. From Athena, Ipsita received a black cloak, which conferred majesty and regality on her. Among other gifts given to her were a crystal skull of Kali and a silver bowl from Venus to be filled with water and used in particular rituals. However, she did not receive a certain glowing amber ball of Hecate, which confers vision and is used for toning up the electro-magnetic system of the body. Carlotta told her, "If you have been and are a true Wiccan, the ball will come to you in some part of your life." That year, Chakraverti was involved in a relationship with singer Elvis Presley, whom she met in Graceland, through a mutual friend. In 1975, Chakraverti's family decided to come back to India. She lived for a few years in Delhi, before coming back to their home in Kolkata in 1978. There, while teaching at South Point High School, she met Jayanta Roy through some mutual friends and became romantically involved with him. Roy is an erstwhile love-child of the king of Orissa, an Indian state. Chakraverti and Roy got married and had a daughter Deepta Roy Chakraverti.

=== 1981–1995: Coming out as a witch and social work ===
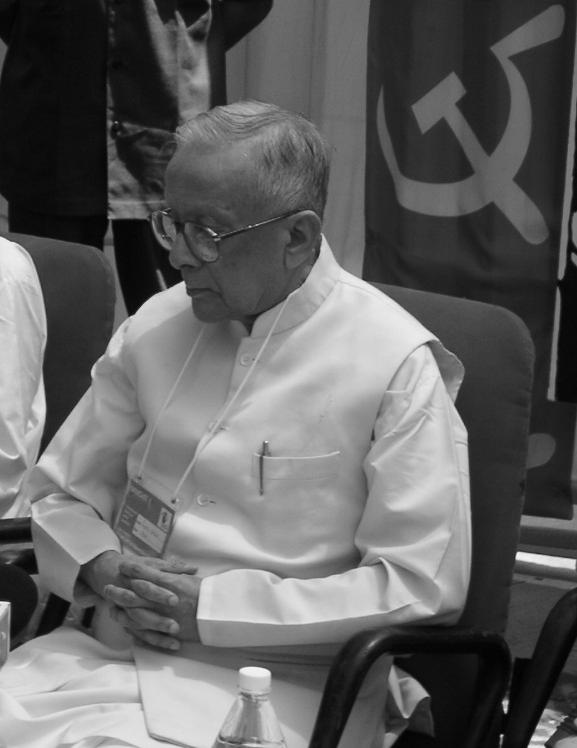
Bengal CPM leader Jyoti Basu, who led a protest movement against Chakraverti declaring herself as a witch.

After Deepta's birth, Chakraverti decided to start her work of Wicca and help women in the villages of West Bengal, where many used to be accused of witchcraft and killed. Chakraverti finally declared in front of the media, in 1986, that she was a witch. A backlash followed, including protest movements and boycotts, led by the Bengal CPM leader Jyoti Basu. However, Chakraverti put all allegations to rest and addressed the media at a press conference. There, she spoke about how Wicca is a Neo pagan religion and a form of modern witchcraft. It is often referred to as Witchcraft or the Craft by its adherents, who are known as Wiccans or Witches. She declared that she wished to start her own healing center and curb the "witch-killings" happening at that time in rural Bengal. The press was impressed by her knowledge and her straightforwardness in addressing such a taboo subject. She later clarified, "I had the social and economic padding and I decided to use it."

After the incident, Chakraverti started to administer the Wiccan way of healing and held sessions at her home. She used to advocate different ways of healing the mind and counsel people on their day to day problems suggest solutions for them. Chakraverti used the curative powers of crystals for curing people of backache, pains and spinal injuries. She also started investigating and bringing to light the plight of women in rural Bengal where many were tortured after being labeled as witches. Chakraverti travelled to such villages in Purulia, Bankura, Birbhum and documented such crimes, sometimes teaching women who were emotionally or physically battered by men to recognize and unleash the power within themselves. "Wicca can do that through their empowerment of the goddesses. [...] The village women—simple women accused of witchcraft—would give me stories which were really heartbreaking. It opened my eyes to how much venom there was in these men. [...] I have tried to bring succor to women branded ‘witches' or ‘dayans' who are still today being molested and killed for what they are believed to practice. I have brought their cases before the authorities and the press in an attempt to show up the hypocrisy of their persecutors – mostly men – who are trying to denigrate this ancient branch of learning in order to wreak revenge on these women for some very personal motives."

=== 1996–2004: Election candidacy, Beloved Witch and Sacred Evil ===
In 1998, Chakraverti campaigned as an Indian National Congress candidate for the Parliament of India in the Hooghly district. She was requested to take up the post on behalf of Sonia Gandhi, but was not elected. Later, Chakraverti became the Secretary of the West Bengal Pradesh Congress Committee. She then started working on her biography, titled Beloved Witch: An Autobiography. The book tells how she came to be a Wiccan and how she had carried on the tag of being a "witch" in a society where witches are still feared and hated. The book, after its release in November 2000, won critical acclaim. Nona Walia of The Times of India commented, "Roy Chakraverti knows that it is unusual for well-bred Bengali girls to become witches and acknowledges her gratitude to her mother for allowing her the right to choose. After all, she says, every strong woman can be a witch in her own right, and that is perhaps the truest message that the book holds for the reader. [...] If there is a problem with the book, it is that much is left unsaid and much of it seems hurried, as if an editor said, 'Don't make it too serious, people won't understand,' just enough for people to chatter about at a cocktail party."

She released a second book in 2003, titled Sacred Evil: Encounters with the Unknown. The book, which was previously known as Good and Evil, chronicled nine case studies during her life as a Wiccan healer and gives explanations as to why those events happened. To promote the book, Chakraverti held a healing session at Oxford Bookstore in Kolkata, where she read excerpts from the book, and gave demonstration of her healing skills, holding the hand of a volunteer, tapping her with her athame (wand) and reciting Egyptian chants. After its release, the book received positive reaction from critics. Rajdeep Bains from The Tribune commented "Sacred Evil is a very coherent account of the author’s dealings with witchcraft and sorcery. Unfortunately, it could add to superstition, which is already prevalent at an unhealthy level in our country. As a work of fiction it would have been laudable; given the cover of truth it becomes a dangerous piece of writing. [...] But what makes Sacred Evil so interesting is the juxtaposition of modern thought with the ageless. After every chapter there are notes on the practices described in it along with modern explanations." Krithika Ranjan from The Hindu commented, "Throughout [Sacred Evil] Chakraverti refers to herself as a skeptic. Yet the stories she tells are bound to raise the ire of rationalists. You can almost hear one spluttering about superstition as you read the story Those who return. [...] In the final analysis, the book is a good read — whether you believe in the dark arts or whether you just want to curl up with a spine chiller." Chakraverti started working on her third book, tentatively titled Every Strong Woman is a Witch.

=== 2005–2007: Sacred Evil – A True Story and The Wiccan Brigade ===
"Yes, the book is based on a real life incident. This particular episode on which the film is based is the signature story. It happened to me in the late 80s. I am a psycho therapist. I was in Calcutta at that point of time. A Mother Superior called me and said that she wanted me to heal a nun. Me being a Wicca, I asked her that wasn't it against her principles. I deal with behavioral problems. The young nun was suffering. I was told that no drugs were to be given. A Wicca was to treat her. Her spirit was suffering. I had healing sessions with her.

— Chakraverti talking to Bollywood Hungama regarding the story and the film.

In 2005, The Kolkata Telegraph reported that director Rituparno Ghosh wanted to cast Chakraverti in a film based on a case the Wiccan had encountered while practicing the craft. Ghosh commented, "Till now, I have dealt with relationships and the intricacies of the human mind. With this film, I want to delve into that which lies beyond and observe how this non-conventional spiritualism, Wicca, guides me. [...] It's a story of two time zones, separated by a span of 150 years, two people of different mindsets and different cultures." However, in 2006, the story Sacred Evil from Sacred Evil: Encounters with the Unknown was adapted into a film by Sahara One Motion Pictures; Ipsita served as creative director. The film, titled as Sacred Evil – A True Story, was a joint venture between Sahara One and Percept Picture Company. Sacred Evil was the last story in the book and is about a nun who was hounded by her troubled past and for whom the convent eventually sought counseling from Chakraverti. Sahara One had approached August 2004 to make a film on Sacred Evil, but she was reluctant to play herself on the big screen when offered the role, and chose, instead to be the creative director. Chakraverti helped pen the script, incorporating a large amount of dialogue from her story. "I told the production team how the protagonist reacted in certain situations, since I had lived the story, and how the dialogue happened. [...] I also insisted that the film be shot in Calcutta, though others had suggested other places, because it's here where I have done most of my therapies." Actress Sarika was signed to play Chakraverti's part, to which Chakraverti said: "The other and more important task was familiarizing Sarika with the ways of a Wiccan. We had several sittings before going for the shoot. Sarika wanted to imbibe me. So, she came down to Delhi and lived with me for a while. I showed her how the healing took place and how certain rituals had been conducted."

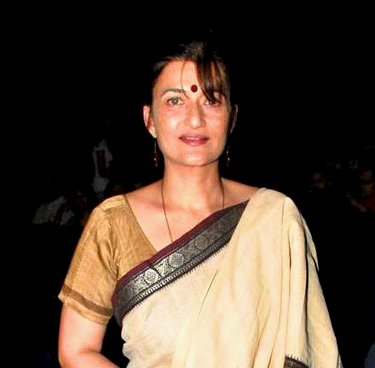
Sarika portrayed Chakraverti in Sacred Evil – A True Story

However, before its release, Sacred Evil – A True Story faced a petition which challenged the Censor Board's decision to grant an exhibition certificate to the film. The petition, filed by lawyer Gerry Coelho, contended that granting the certificate to the film, was unethical and indecent on the part of the Censor Board of India and constituted total non-application of mind. The objections raised by Coelho were based on the film's posters and promotional advertisements. The Censor Board said that they had not been insensitive to Christian sentiments. "We are very careful when we screen sensitive movies [...] But, there is nothing in the movie that is objectionable, or will hurt the sentiments of the community in question." The film was given green signal by the censor board, but was still postponed because of non-availability of theatres. It was finally released on 23 June 2006, and was a commercial disappointment but received mixed reviews from critics. Taran Adarsh from Bollywood Hungama commented: "Sacred Evil is a pleasant change and a break from the monotony of the regular Hindi films. However, the subject is one that caters to a niche audience only. However, the fact cannot be denied that the narrative does not go off-track nor does it seem as if some sequences have been incorporated for the sake of it. Despite its slow pacing, Sacred Evil has the knack to hold the interest of its viewer. It's definitely a fine effort by directors Abiyaan Rajhans and Abhigyan Jha. The performances are above average, with Sarika dominating the show." Deepali Singh from The Kolkata Telegraph gave the film three out of ten, stating "If one hopes to discover the secrets of Wiccan ways in Sacred Evil, directed by Abiyaan Rajhans and Abhigyan Jha, one is in for a major disappointment. Beyond a candlelit session, which doesn't really lead anywhere except to a few flickers of vague shadows in the background, the story just about treads into the Wiccan world. [...] Sarika, as Ipsita, ghost walks through another expressionless comeback."

Chakraverti announced the launch of the Wiccan Brigade in November 2006. It was a platform for those interested in studying Wicca and using the branch of knowledge to holistic effect. Though Wicca was predominantly practiced by women, Wiccan Brigade welcomed men also. Chakraverti commented, "Close to 100 people, comprising professionals, some housewives and many students, have approached me on the Net to start the group. I think it’s the right time to institutionalize Wicca. [...] Though it wouldn’t be possible to have here the kind of training we had in the Laurentians, there would be sessions on yoga and meditation, and lectures and group discussions." A batch of 25 people were selected through a screening process and they participated in the sessions consisting of social, historical, psychological and gender-related issues of Wicca. In July 2007, the National Commission for Minority Educational Institutions (NCMEI) nominated Chakraverti to head a panel tasked with improving the status of young girls in India. She launched the Wiccan Brigade in London in December 2007and named it Ipsita's Yogini Club. Chakraverti commented, "I’ve always believed the yogini and the witch are the same, and London seems to me to be a place where various cultures of the world have come together. It has a rich cultural history and an atmosphere in which the spirit of the past lives on. It is the right place for the Yogini Club."

=== 2008–present: The Konark Project, Parapaar and The Living Doll ===
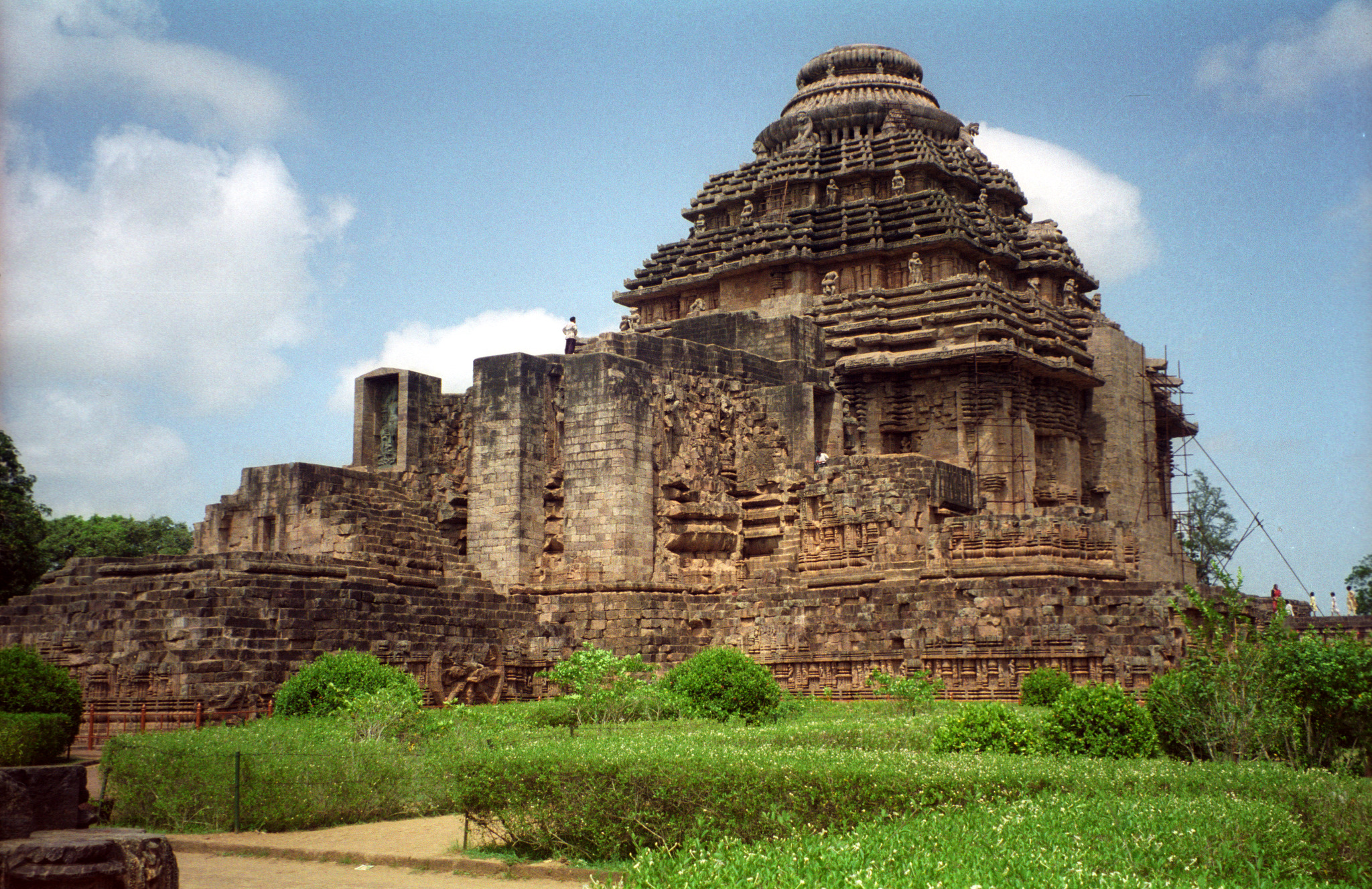
The Konark Sun Temple which has esoteric and mystical powers, claimed by Chakraverti.

Chakraverti claimed to have cracked the mystic code that shrouds the Konark Sun Temple in Orissa, and its curative power. After years of research, she made this revelation in a documentary titled The Konark Code, which was premiered at the Nehru Centre in London in February 2008. Her theory was that the temple at Konark was a healing spot, a cure centre for various diseases. King Narasimha Deva started making the temple in 1253 AD and it took him 12 years to complete it. "Myth says that Samba, the son of Krishna, went to the spot to get himself cured of leprosy. Till date, hundreds of leprosy patients flock to the temple to cure themselves. There are other factors that add to the temple's existence as a healing centre." According to Chakraverti, solar rays and sound frequency also played an important part in healing. The dance that was part of worship was for a purpose. The vibration of the steps of the dancers energized the temple stones. The sun's rays, because of the particular corner in which the temple was constructed, also played an important part. In August, Chakraverti worked on a tele serial for ETV Bangla called Parapaar. The show was based on Chakraverti's life-journey and her encounters with the paranormal. A dramatized story, where actress Chandrayee Ghosh played the part, was aired from Monday to Friday, and on Saturday, Chakraverti herself interacted with audiences through phone-ins related to the story. She commented, "I had reservations when I was approached for Parapaar because it’s important to convey the philosophy and atmosphere in Wicca in the right way. But I feel it’s time to reach Wicca to the masses, and since Bengal is the place where the Mother Goddess Durga is worshipped, it’s important that misconceptions about Dakinividya are shattered. People should know who a daini is and what she does."

In June 2009, Chakraverti collaborated with filmmaker Anjan Dutt and Sarika to make a film called The Loving Doll, with the story taken from Sacred Evil again. It will be filmed in Hindi with bits of English. Sarika plays the central character of a middle-aged woman obsessed about losing her looks. The story revolves around a married couple beset with personal problems, triggered by a doll owned by the wife. Charaverti said: "After the film Sacred Evil, I have been approached by several directors for another film but the inspiration was not there. This time around there was a synchronicity — Sarika phoned me to ask if I was thinking of another film. She has long wanted to play the woman in The Loving Doll [...] Then I happened to see Madly Bangalee, and liked Anjan’s work very much. I think he has the touch to be able to handle the subject of The Loving Doll. So I contacted him and he was very interested in the project. Though he works in a very different genre from mine, I think there is empathy between his work and mine." Chakraverti also said that she may play the part of a healer in the film, "It’s the director’s prerogative. We will do what is best for the film." In April 2010, ETV Bangla created a serial called Dibaratrir Galpo, which was based on Beloved Witch. The plot of Dibaratrir Galpo, directed by Tathagata Banerjee, centres around a dispute between two aristocratic Bengali families, but the lead character (played by Sudipta Chakraborty) was shown as a follower of Wicca who learns to develop her psychic power and uses it to counter the machinations of her enemies. Chakraverti appeared on the commercials for the serial because she felt that her deglamorised presence helped audiences in the suburbs see elderly women, who are often branded as witches, in a positive light. "I felt that the story of Dibaratrir Galpo would take to esoteric ideas very well. It has a women-oriented theme and it will show how the negative aspects of the esoteric can be countered."

== Influence and legacy ==
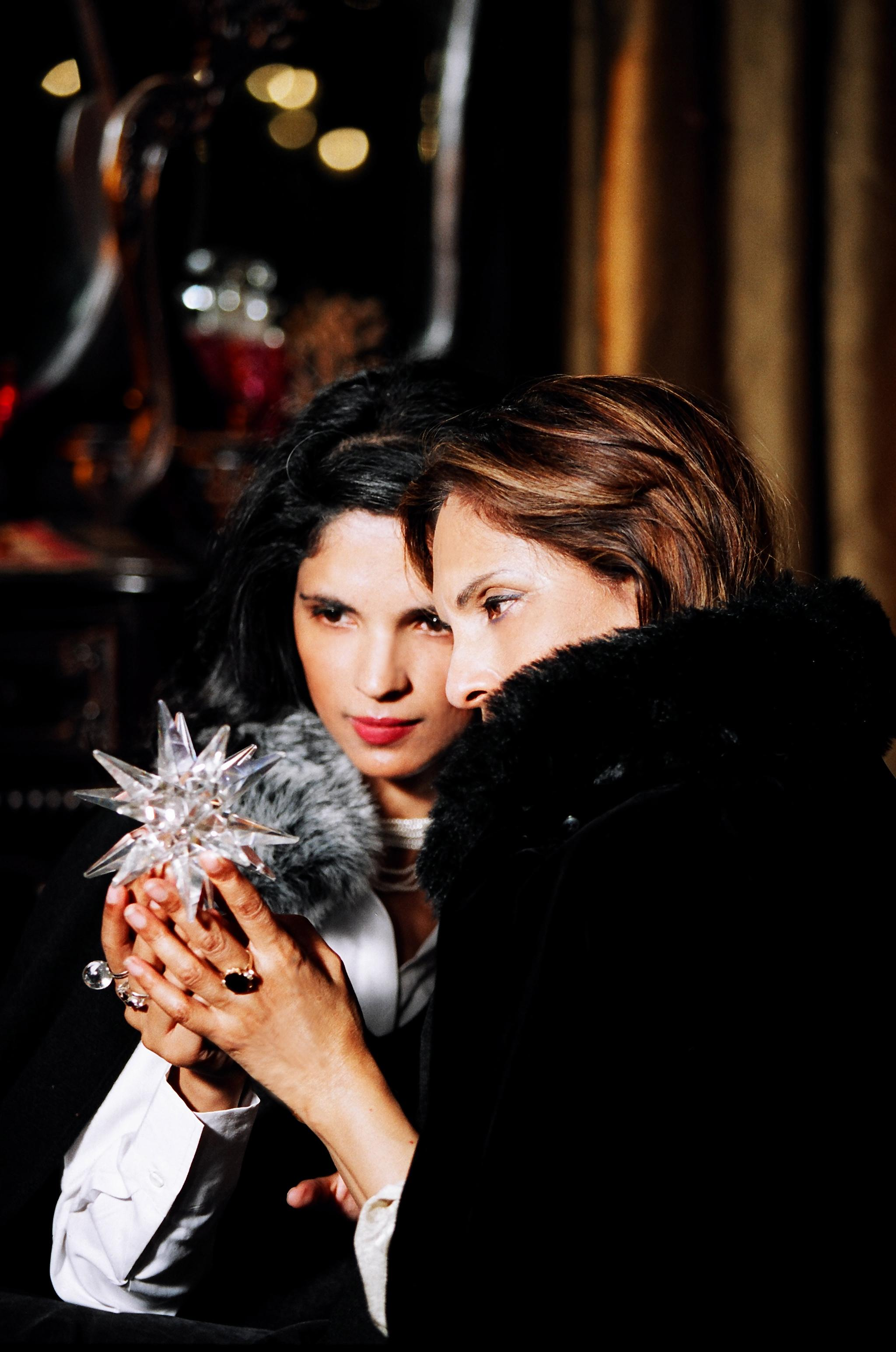
Chakraverti (right) with her daughter Deepta, holding a crystal star in their hand.

Chakraverti's public declaration that she was a witch came at a time, when India still considered the word "witch", taboo. Author Kumkum Bhandari said that "Ipsita was a pioneer. Remember, call someone a 'witch' and you could be in for slander. Legally. But she was easily accepted. Partly because of her packaging and presentation—she is elegant, articulate and poised. People listen when she speaks. [...] Life and magic course through and around her. Being a witch is about ripping away layers of social conditioning, gender limitations and protective shields. It is, in a sense about moving towards being the complete and total woman. There is intensity, conviction and passion in the way Ipsita talks about witchcraft, or Wicca—the Craft of the Wise—and its relevance throughout history." Chakraverti also observes that "If I had come from a different rung of society, or was illiterate, the reaction wouldn't be the same. I have observed that it is always the person they will accept, and then the word Wicca. Witches are not born, they are made. Or perhaps they sculpt themselves." According to her, every strong woman can be considered a witch. "A witch is the total woman. Strong daring women who have dared to live their own life, whatever it is. Jacqueline Kennedy, Indira Gandhi, Marilyn Monroe, Madonna, Namita Gokhale, Kiran Bedi—all of them could count as witches." Chakraverti has argued that Wicca is the first feminist movement in history and the oldest women-oriented branch of learning.

In Beloved Witch, Chakraverti stated that "The witches of olden times were learned women. They were goddess worshippers. They were doctors and wiser than the panchayat men." According to scholar Gary F. Jensen, who wrote the book The path of the devil: early modern witch hunts, Chakraverti's self-confession of being a witch, brought a new light on the taboo subject of witchcraft in India, and the rest of the world. She paralleled the conflict between women as healers and tribal leaders of Indian villages to the conflict between women, accused of witchcraft and the male-dominated society during Medieval Europe. Jensen added, "I think what Chakraverti has done is open up a new door, not only for India, but for the rest of the world, by showing that women can't be held down by norms. She can be anything she wants." She commented about being a Wiccan as,

"A Wiccan knows how to live life. There is no negativity no dullness, no pulling back. That effortlessness is there. Before you can draw energy from the elements to rejuvenate yourself, you have to love nature, attune and identify with it. To bring it to more practical and understandable levels, you must have an almost sensuous and sensual relation with what is around you. Attune your senses finely to recognize the sensuous touches of nature. Winter flowers are not fragrant, but there is a smell to them. Identify it. Only as you become finely-honed and centered will you be able to sense and use the presence of earth energy or that of other elements. The more you sensitize yourself, the more Nature reveals her secrets."

Chakraverti's greatest influence has been on her daughter Deepta, who was chosen as her successor to helm the task of promoting about Wicca. Chakraverti commented: "There are certain aspects of Wicca that you can't teach; they have to be absorbed. Something that I am not consciously passing on, something that has to be taken from me. I felt Deepta had the potential and I would have never forced her had she not been so keen. This is not necessarily through a mother-daughter bonding, it can be guru-shishya (mentor-protégé), or any form of relationship where there is a guiding force." Deepta, was trained by Chakraverti in meditation, physical exercises, studying old religions, and other Wiccan regimen. Chakraverti has also brought forth similarities between Old Wiccan findings and the discoveries of modern physics and parapsychology. According to Sudipto Shome of The Hindu, "You could be called a dayan and burnt alive, or you could be called an enchantress and enlighten an audience on the art of Wicca. Ipsita is the latter, and she has used her social and economic padding to make others listen to her."

== Bibliography ==
- Roy Chakraverti, Ipsita (2000), Beloved Witch: An Autobiography, HarperCollins, p. 283, ISBN 81-7223-380-9
- Roy Chakraverti, Ipsita (2003), Sacred Evil: Encounters With the Unknown, HarperCollins, p. 200, ISBN 81-7223-452-X
