= Henry Staveley Lawrence =

British civil servant and colonial administrator

Sir Henry Staveley Lawrence KCSI (20 October 1870 – 29 June 1949) was a British civil servant and colonial administrator. He was the Acting governor of Bombay during the British Raj from 20 March 1926 to 8 December 1928.

Born in County Donegal, he was the son of George Henry Lawrence, a judge in the British Civil Service, and Margaret Staveley. He was the grandson of Sir George St Patrick Lawrence KCSI CB of the British Indian Army and great-nephew of Sir Henry Montgomery Lawrence and John Lawrence, 1st Baron Lawrence.

He was appointed a Knight Commander of the Order of the Star of India in the 1926 New Year Honours.
