= Margaret Ida Balfour =

Scottish doctor and campaigner

Margaret Ida Balfour CBE FRCOG
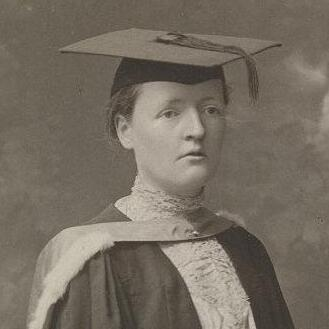
- graduating
- Born: 21 April 1866; Edinburgh, Scotland
- Died: 1 December 1945 (aged 79)
- Education: Edinburgh School of Medicine for Women
- Known for: pioneer and campaigner for women's health in India
- Medical career
- Profession: Medical doctor
- Institutions: The Women’s Medical Service for India
- Awards: Gold Kaisar-i-Hind Medal for public service to India

Margaret Ida Balfour, CBE FRCOG (21 April 1866 – 1 December 1945) was a Scottish medical doctor and campaigner for women’s medical health issues, who made a significant contribution to the development of medicine in India. Her prolific writing during the early 20th century alerted many to the health needs of women and children in India and Africa and the unhealthy environments in which they lived.

== Early life and education ==
Margaret Balfour, daughter of Frances Grace Blaikie (1820–1891) and Scottish accountant Robert Balfour (1818–1869), both from Aberdeenshire, was born in Edinburgh in 1866. Her brother caught scarlet fever, which infected her father who died from the disease aged 51, and was buried in Dean Cemetery. Balfour may have been driven to pursue a medical career as a result, and she was described as having 'extraordinary determination and intelligence' and 'the iron hand within the velvet glove if she wanted something she would persist' at a time when few woman studied medicine. Balfour studied at Edinburgh School of Medicine for Women under Sophia Jex-Blake and qualified as a doctor in 1891, although women were not permitted to formally graduate from the University of Edinburgh, so she went to France and Belgium to do so. After graduating Balfour spent a year working with Dr Annie McCall at the Clapham Maternity Hospital in South London before moving to India in 1892.

== Career and research ==
Balfour's first role in India was as manager of the Zenana Hospital in Ludhiana, where she had to confront the local 'purdah' tradition for women in labour in sometimes insanitary facilities, and went from educating local 'midwives' to ensuring that a medical school for women was established two years after her arrival. She then spent 18 years working as a Medical Superintendent, initially at the Dufferin Hospital (funded by Lady Dufferin, wife of the Viceroy of India) at Nahan, where she worked until 1902, and then the Dufferin Hospital in Patiala, where she remained until 1914.

Balfour's success in these roles led to her appointment as assistant to the Inspector General of Civil Hospitals, Punjab, in 1914. Two years later, she became the Chief Medical Officer of the newly formed Women’s Medical Service, a post she held until 1924. At the same time, Balfour served for eight years as joint secretary at Delhi and Simla to the Countess of Dufferin’s Fund, an organisation which was established to promote medical education for women in India. In recognition of her work, in 1920 Balfour was awarded the Kaisar-i-Hind Medal for Public Service in India.

Balfour ended her formal work in India in 1924 and returned to the UK, where she was appointed a CBE. She continued to work on behalf of Indian women, however, calling for the employment of more female doctors in India.

While being based in the UK, Balfour made a number of return visits to India, particularly in connection with research into tropical anaemias, and she was undertaking with Dr Lucy Wills. In 1929 she published, with Ruth Young, The Work of Medical Women in India, a history of medical women in that country. Also that year, Balfour became a Fellow of the Royal College of Obstetricians and Gynaecologists. In 1930, Balfour published results of an investigation into maternity conditions among female mill-workers in Bombay and became one of the founding members of the Overseas Association of the Medical Women’s Federation.

In the 1930s, Balfour also became interested in maternal health issues in the UK, publishing Motherhood in the Special Areas of Durham and Tyneside with Joan Catherine Drury in 1935, and the Study of the Effect on Mother and Child of Gainful Occupation During Pregnancy in 1938.

During the Second World War, Balfour became an ARP medical officer in London and a member of the National Council of Women.

== Recognition and awards ==
Balfour was awarded the Gold Kaisar-i-Hind Medal in 1920. The Royal College of Obstetrics and Gynaecology made her a Fellow. In 1929 she became president of the all-India Association of Medical Women. She was appointed a Commander of the CBE in the 1924 Birthday Honours.
