= Hawkey baronets =

Extinct baronetcy in the Baronetage of the United Kingdom

The Hawkey Baronetcy, of Woodford in the County of Essex, was a title in the Baronetage of the United Kingdom. It was created on 5 July 1945 for Sir James Alfred Hawkey, Chairman of the West Essex Unionist Association and Mayor of the Borough of Wanstead and Woodford. The title became extinct on the death of the second Baronet Sir Roger Pryce Hawkey in 1975.

== Hawkey baronets, of Woodford (1945) ==
- Sir (Alfred) James Hawkey, 1st Baronet (1877–1952)
- Sir Roger Pryce Hawkey, 2nd Baronet (1905–1975)
