= Charlotte Leighton Houlton =

British physician

Charlotte Leighton Houlton CBE, MD, FRCOG
- Born: 23 October 1882; Hull
- Died: 13 December 1956 (aged 74); Whitby
- Occupations: Physician, medical administrator
- Honours: Kaisar-i-Hind Medal (1927)

Charlotte Leighton Houlton CBE (23 October 1882 – 13 December 1956) was a British physician.

== Early life ==
Charlotte Leighton Houlton was born in Hull in Yorkshire, one of the ten children of John Houlton and Charlotte Leighton Houlton. She was educated at the London School of Medicine for Women and the Royal Free Hospital in London, earning her medical degree in 1917.

== Career ==
Houlton was an obstetric assistant, pathologist, and surgeon at the Elizabeth Garrett Anderson Hospital in London. She first visited India in 1913, and from 1918 to 1919 taught as a professor of obstetrics and gynaecology at the Lady Hardinge Medical College in Delhi. From 1924 to 1928, she was medical superintendent of the Women's Medical Service (WMS) at Simla, where she worked on establishing a women's hospital and medical college. From 1927 to 1932, she was medical superintendent at St. Stephen's Hospital in Delhi. She returned to Lady Hardinge College in 1932, as principal and professor. From 1935 to 1939 she was chief medical officer of the Women's Medical Service, based in Delhi, an appointment that was criticised in the Indian press as representing a "persistent disregard to seniority of the Indian members of the WMS".

Houlton was secretary of the Countess of Dufferin Fund, and helped plan the All-India Institute of Medical Sciences. She was also medical missions secretary for the Society for the Propagation of the Gospel. Her professional publications included "An Investigation of the Bacteria of the Vagina in Pregnancy" (British Journal of Obstetrics and Gynaecology, 1924).

Houlton received the Kaisar-i-Hind Medal in 1927. She was elected a Fellow of the Royal College of Obstetricians and Gynecologists in 1937. She was made a Commander of the British Empire (CBE) in 1939.

== Personal life ==
Houlton died in 1956, after several years with Parkinson's disease, aged 74 years, at the St Francis Anglican convent in Whitby.
