= Elizabeth Bielby =

British physician and medical missionary

Elizabeth Bielby was a nineteenth-century British physician and medical missionary. She petitioned Queen Victoria for a women's medical service for India and was instrumental in the foundation of the Countess of Dufferin Fund.

She was affiliated to the Zenana Bible and Medical Mission and arrived in Lucknow in 1876. In 1881, the Maharaja of Punna asked Bielby, then undertaking medical missionary work in Lahore, to come and treat his wife, the Maharani, who was ill. Bielby agreed and the Maharini soon recovered. On the morning of Bielby's departure to England, the Maharaja asked her to visit Queen Victoria with a message,

"I want you to tell the Queen and the Prince and Princess of Wales, the men and women of England, what the women of India suffer when they are sick. Write [the message] small, Doctor Miss Sahib, for I want you to put it into a locket, and you are to wear this locket round your neck till you see our Great Queen and give it to her yourself. You are not to send it through another."

After completing her medical training at the London School of Medicine for Women, Bielby and Mary Scharlieb, the first female British doctor to practice in India, were received by the Queen. Bielby presented her with the locket from the Maharani of Punna. In response, Queen Victoria wrote back to the Maharani saying:

“We had no idea it was as bad as this. Something must be done for the poor creatures. We wish it generally known that we sympathize with every effort to relieve the suffering of the women of India.”

The Queen then summoned Hariot Hamilton-Temple-Blackwood, Marchioness of Dufferin and Ava, more commonly known as Lady Dufferin, the Vicerine of India, to Windsor Castle and tasked her with improving healthcare and education for the women of India. In 1885, Lady Dufferin set up the Countess of Dufferin Fund which provided scholarships for women to be educated as doctors, hospital assistants, nurses, and midwives. It also financed the construction of female hospitals, dispensaries, and female only wards in preexisting hospitals. In 1886, Bielby was practising and teaching midwifery to female students at a lying-in hospital at Lahore, with the intention of establishing further women's hospitals in India.
