= Countess of Dufferin Fund =

The Countess of Dufferin Fund was established by Hariot Hamilton-Temple-Blackwood, Marchioness of Dufferin and Ava, more commonly known as Lady Dufferin, in 1885 and was dedicated to improving women's healthcare in India. The Fund was founded after Queen Victoria gave Lady Dufferin the task of improving healthcare for women in India. The Fund provided scholarships for women to be educated in the medical field as doctors, hospital assistants, nurses, and midwives. It also financed the construction of female hospitals, dispensaries, and female only wards in preexisting hospitals. The Fund marks the beginning of Western medicine for women in India and global health as a diplomatic concern.

== History of the Fund ==
=== Background ===
During the 19th century there was a major push in India to improve healthcare for women, especially maternal health. Lying-in hospitals were built as well as training and teaching hospitals. Many hospitals were also constructing wards for women and learning to treat female-specific diseases.

=== Origins ===
In 1885, Lady Dufferin set up the Fund after being contacted by Queen Victoria who gave her the task of helping the suffering women of India. Queen Victoria had been recently contacted by Elizabeth Bielby, a missionary in India who focused on women's health. During Beilby's mission, she had treated the Maharani of Puna who gave her a message to relay to the Queen of the United Kingdom. The message said that “the women of India suffer when they are sick.” In response, Queen Victoria wrote back to the Maharani saying:

“We had no idea it was as bad as this. Something must be done for the poor creatures. We wish it generally known that we sympathize with every effort to relieve the suffering of the women of India.”

Lady Dufferin then started the Fund after being summoned to Windsor Castle by the Queen who gave her the task of improving healthcare and education for the women of India. A visit from Mary Scharlieb, the first female British doctor to practice in India, also mobilized the Queen to act on women's poor health and suffering in India. She met with Queen Victoria and expressed a similar message as the Maharni's: the dire situation of Indian women.

=== Establishment ===
Lady Dufferin established the Fund in 1885 and immediately began creating projects and channeling money towards women's health and teaching in India. The Countess of Dufferin Fund is also known as “The National Association for Supplying Medical Aid to the Women of India” and the “Lady Dufferin Fund.” This Fund marked one of the first diplomatic pushes to improve global health in the world, and the introduction of western medicine for women in India.

== Fund’s goals ==
The Fund had three primary goals: providing medical tuition, medical relief, and female nurses and midwives to assist in hospitals and private homes. The Fund supplied scholarships for the medical education (medical tuition) of women in India. The education of traditional Indian midwives, called dias, was a major goal of the Fund because many western doctors observed the dais's practices and found their traditions to be harmful. For example, the dais's would massage the abdomen of the mother to speed up labor however that tradition caused uterine prolapse, a widespread issue amongst Indian women at the time. Because the dias’ methods were viewed as violent and extremely harmful, the Fund put forth money to educate them on successful ways to help women before, during, and after childbirth. The Fund also provided medical relief by establishing dispensaries and cottage hospitals for women and children under female superintendence. In addition, it opened female wards in existing hospitals also under female management as well as all women hospitals called zenana hospitals. The Fund also supplied trained female nurses and midwives in hospitals and in private homes.

== Projects ==
The Fund financed treatment and teaching hospitals in Bihar, Calcutta, Madras, Karachi, Delhi, Bombay and in many of the United Provinces (roughly present day Uttar Pradesh and Uttarakhand). Most notably, the Fund sponsored the Lady Aitchison Hospital in Lahore, India. The Lady Aitchison Hospital, also known as the Aitchison Memorial Hospital, was a major center for training nurses and tradition midwives like the dias. Many of the hospitals the Fund financed are still functioning today. For example, the Lady Dufferin Hospital in Karachi is the largest solely female dedicated hospital today in Pakistan.

== Funding and Administration ==
The Fund's major financial basis was donations. Many saw this as a source of instability because donations were based on the popularity of Lady Dufferin and her husband as well as the favors expected by the donors in return. The administration of the Fund consisted of a central committee of members of the Viceroy's Council and Home Department. It also included many influential Englishmen and Indians such as the Maharja Sir Jotendro Mohun Tagore, Sir Syed Ahmed Khan, and Sir Dinshaw Maneckji Petit.

== Criticism of the Fund ==
There were three major criticisms of the Fund: its teaching, effectiveness, and integrity. Many believed the Fund was inefficient. Some argued that they inadequately taught doctors and employed subpar medical practitioners. By October 1908, only 43 completely qualified women medical professionals were working under the Fund however only 11 held university degrees. The British Medical Journal wrote in 1908 that, “The Government appears to have a perfect delight in swamping the country with unqualified medical practitioners." The Fund was also criticized as ineffective for placing male doctors in Zenana hospitals. Zenana women's traditions forbade them from seeing, so they could be treated by the doctors the Fund provided. In addition, the Fund was also criticized for not giving the women they were educating enough reason to stay with learning medicine. The Fund paid for their education however their salaries were not high enough so it made more financial sense for the women to marry before they could give back to the hospital that educated them. The Fund set up this cycle of educating women who would then work for them, however, it was ineffective in some cases because the women would not stick with the medical profession for financial reasons. Because of the many criticisms of ineffectiveness, some of the Fund's highest critics like The British Medical Journal called for a reorganization of the Fund. Some also believed vanity, not philanthropy, was the source of motivation for establishing the Fund. They criticized both Lady Dufferin for starting the Fund for her personal image and Queen Victoria for supporting the Fund for Britain's international image.

== After Lady Dufferin ==
The Fund continued even after Lady Dufferin's term ended. Lady Lansdowne, who succeeded Lady Dufferin, continued to put work into the Fund which was passed down from vicereine to vicereine until 1947. In 1947, India gained independence from Great Britain and the Fund was taken over by the Central Indian Government by the Countess of Dufferin's Fund Act, 1957. Once the Fund was taken over by the Central Government, it became obsolete. In 2005 a bill was passed repealing the Countess of Dufferin's Fund Act, 1957, for unclear reasons.

The Fund was celebrated in Rudyard Kipling's poem The Song of the Women, published in 1888, the final year of Lady Dufferin's term as Vicereine.

== Notable employees ==
- Margaret Ida Balfour
- Kadambini Ganguly
- Florence Dissent
- Charlotte Leighton Houlton
- Motibai Kapadia
