= Richard Bielby =

English cricketer (born 1947)

Personal information
- Full name: Stephen Richard Bielby
- Born: 9 March 1947 (age 79); Windsor, Berkshire, England
- Batting: Right-handed
- Bowling: Right-arm off break
- Role: Batter

Domestic team information
- Years: Team
- 1967–1971: Nottinghamshire

Career statistics
Competition	First-class	List A
Matches	43	17
Runs scored	837	169
Batting average	18.19	14.08
100s/50s	–/2	–/1
Top score	62	62
Balls bowled	234	48
Wickets	3	3
Bowling average	53.66	5.33
5 wickets in innings	–	–
10 wickets in match	–	–
Best bowling	1/14	3/16
Catches/stumpings	16/–	5/–
- Source: CricketArchive, 22 October 2024

Stephen Richard Bielby (born 9 March 1947 in Windsor) is an English former first-class cricketer who played for Nottinghamshire between 1967 and 1971. He also appeared in Minor Counties matches for Buckinghamshire.
