= Byass baronets =

Extinct baronetcy in the Baronetage of the United Kingdom

The Byass Baronetcy, of Port Talbot in the County of Glamorgan, was a title in the Baronetage of the United Kingdom. It was created on 30 January 1926 for Sidney Byass, Chairman of the Glamorgan County Council. The title became extinct on the death of the second Baronet in 1976.

== Byass baronets, of Port Talbot (1926) ==
- Sir Sidney Hutchinson Byass, 1st Baronet (1862–1929)
- Sir Geoffrey Robert Sidney Byass, 2nd Baronet (1895–1976)
