= Women's Medical Service for India =

The Women’s Medical Service for India (also referred to as the Women’s Medical Service) was a state-funded medical service for women in British India. Until its foundation in 1913, medical care for women in India was limited to that provided by missionaries or charities like the Countess of Dufferin Fund. Both British and Indian women could apply to work in the service: an article in The Lancet in 1923 noted that recruits from Britain would have first class passage paid and that although the rates of pay are lower than in the Indian Medical Service, lodging is provided and the duties are lighter.

Margaret Ida Balfour served as its first director until she retired in 1924. Charlotte Leighton Houlton was the service's chief medical officer from 1935 to 1939.

== See also ==
- Indian Medical Service
