= Harry Charles Augustus Eyres =

British diplomat

Sir Harry Charles Augustus Eyres (21 July 1856 – 19 July 1944) was a British diplomat. He was Envoy to Albania from 1922 to 1926.
