= Cecil Aldin =

British artist (1870–1935)

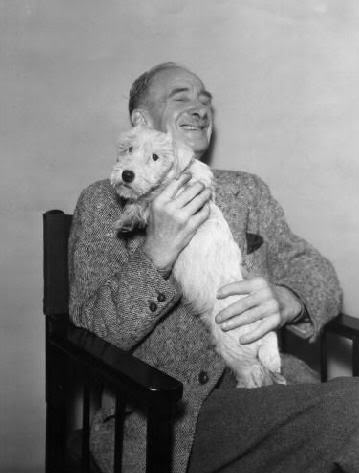
- Portrait of Cecil Aldin and his dog
- Born: 28 April 1870; Slough, England
- Died: 6 January 1935 (aged 64); London, England
- Education: National Art Training School
- Known for: Painting

Cecil Charles Windsor Aldin (28 April 1870 – 6 January 1935), was a British artist and illustrator. He is best known for his paintings and sketches of animals, sports, and rural life. Aldin executed village scenes and rural buildings in chalk, pencil and also wash sketching. He was an enthusiastic sportsman and a Master of Fox Hounds, and many of his pictures illustrated hunting. Aldin's early influences included Randolph Caldecott and John Leech.

== Early life and career ==
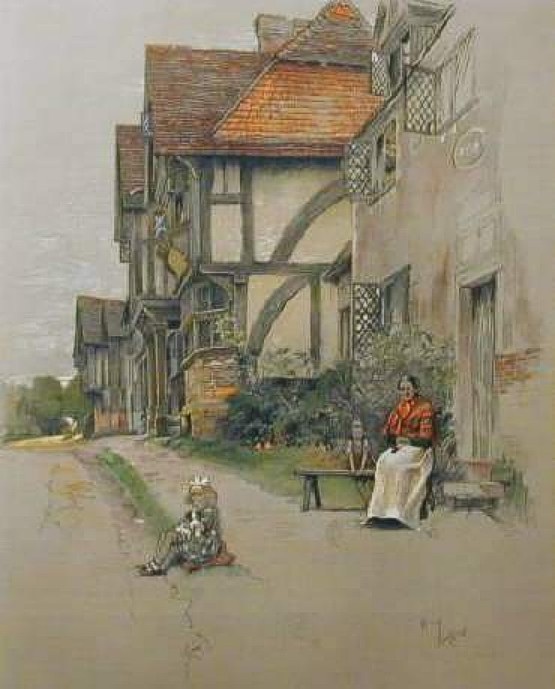
Chiddingstone

Born in Slough, Aldin was educated at Eastbourne College and Solihull Grammar School. Cecil Aldin's father, a builder, was a keen amateur artist so Cecil started drawing at a very young age. He studied art at the studio of Albert Joseph Moore in Kensington but, unhappy with the teaching methods Aldin left after a month to study animal anatomy at the National Art Training School in South Kensington. After this he attended a summer school run by the animal painter and teacher, William Frank Calderon at Midhurst, Sussex. Aldin left when he developed rheumatic fever but shortly afterwards he sold his first drawing, which appeared in The Building News of 12 September 1890. This was followed by a dog show picture purchased by The Graphic in 1891. He rented a studio in Chelsea and in 1892 he began a long association with The Illustrated London News. Whilst at Chelsea he would often draw in the London Zoological Gardens and an early work on a tiger in the zoo which was drawn from life was found to be a copyright of a photograph by Gambier Bolton. He also did some work for Cadbury's advertising. Aldin was commissioned by The Pall Mall Budget in 1894 to illustrate the serialisation of stories from Rudyard Kipling's The Second Jungle Book.

At the invitation of the fine genre painter, Walter Dendy Sadler Aldin stayed at Chiddingstone where he made close friends with Phil May, John Hassall and Lance Thackeray and along with them, Dudley Hardy and Tom Browne, founded the London Sketch Club. The birth of his son and daughter inspired a series of nursery pictures which together with his large sets of the Fallowfield Hunt, Bluemarket Races, Harefield Harriers and Cottesbrook Hunt prints brought him much popularity. This was enhanced by his ever expanding book and magazine illustrative work. He joined the Chelsea Arts Club and held his first exhibition in Paris in 1908. An exhibition in Paris in 1909 was received with much acclaim and extended his fame to a wider audience. He illustrated the 1910 edition of Charles Dickens' The Pickwick Papers. A popular book by Aldin was Sleeping Partners, a sequence of pastel drawings of his dogs on a couch. It included his Irish Wolfhound Micky, a puppy he purchased from Florence Nagle as a gift for his wife, and his favourite model, Cracker, a Bull Terrier with a dark patch over one eye. Aldin moved to the Henley area as his interest in hunting, horses and dogs increased and in 1910 he became Master of the South Berkshire Hunt as well as being associated with other local packs. He lived at The Abbots, Sulhamstead Abbots from 1913 to 1914 and was church warden of St Mary's church.

== World War One ==
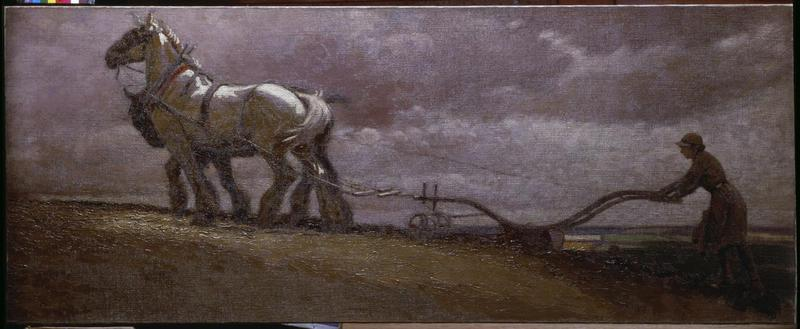
A Land Girl Ploughing (1918)(Art.IWM ART 2618)

At the outbreak of the First World War Aldin was the sole Master of the South Berkshire Foxhounds and became a Remount Purchasing Officer in charge of an Army Remount Depot. A number of other artists, including Lionel Edwards, Alfred Munnings G.D. Armour and Cedric Morris, also worked in Remount Depots during the War. Such was the military demand for horses Aldins' own mounts were among the first to be given up to the Army. Aldin set up a number of Remount Depots around Berkshire including, as an experiment, one run entirely by women as there were no longer enough men available for the work. The experiment was deemed successful and a number of Ladies' Army Remount Depots were established. This brought Aldin to the attention of the Women's Work Sub-Committee of the newly formed Imperial War Museum who, in February 1919, asked to purchase two of his wartime paintings. Women Employed in the Remount Depot, The Kennels, Pangbourne was duly purchased but Aldin was unwilling to release the second picture requested. The original of A Land Girl Ploughing, a realistic portrayal of a lone Land Girl guiding two large horses, had been done on old, re-used canvas using leftover scene paint and, in Aldin's view, was not suitable for a national collection. He agreed to replicate the painting with better quality materials and a member of the Women's Land Army was sent to his studio in Pangbourne to model as the plough girl, and ensure all the details of the uniform were correct. The painting is considered among the most iconic images of the work of the Women's Land Army from World War One. Aldin and his wife Rita lost their only son, Dudley Cecil, at Vimy Ridge in 1916, which affected the artist deeply for many years and had a profound effect on his style of work.

== Later life ==
After the war Aldin spent much of his time organising pony and dog shows, particularly on Exmoor, where he followed the Devon and Somerset Staghounds. He continued to paint, often large equestrian portraits and completed numerous magazine and book illustrations. In the 1920s he added further prints of hunting scenes to create a series of "The Hunting Countries" as well as concentrating on his ever popular studies of his own and visiting dogs. He published a short series of fully illustrated books in 1923, Old Manor Houses and Old Inns. A series of prints depicting Old Inns, Old Manor Houses and Cathedrals was also created.

In 1930 Aldin retired to live in the Balearic Islands, hoping the warmer climate would ease his arthritis. He lived in Palma and elsewhere on Mallorca while continuing to paint and etch, producing some of his best work, including illustrations for The Bunch Book (1932), about Bunch, a Sealyham Terrier by James Douglas. Travelling back to England for a visit in January 1935 he suffered a heart attack whilst still at sea. When his ship docked, Aldin was rushed to the London Clinic but could not be saved.

== Gallery ==
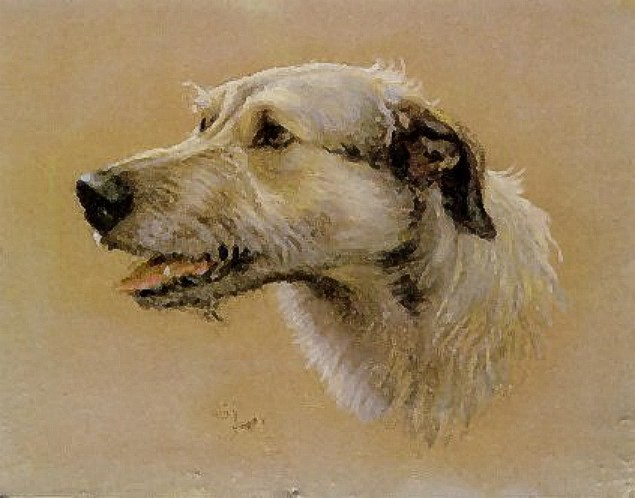
"Sir Michael of Sheppey"

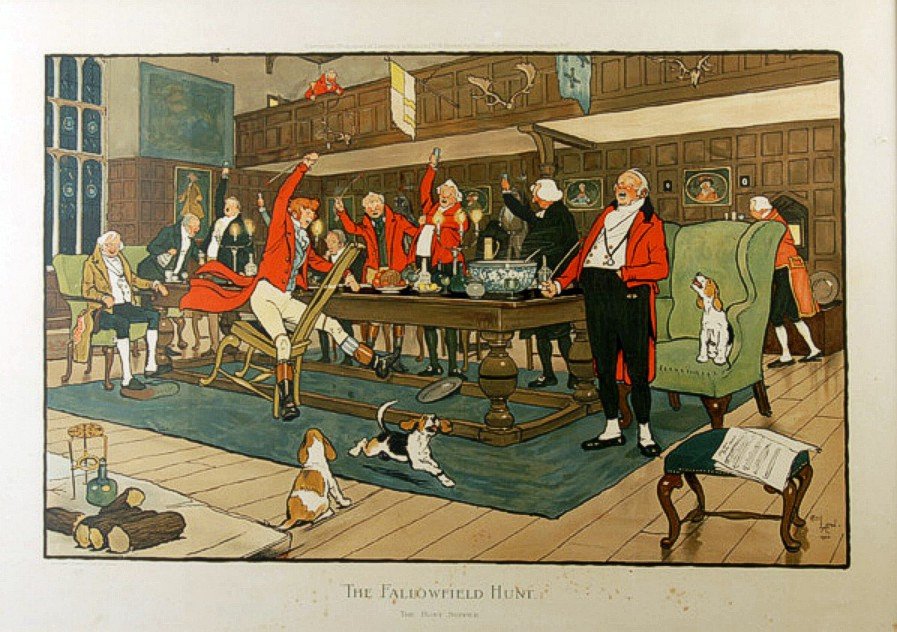
The Fallowfield Hunt

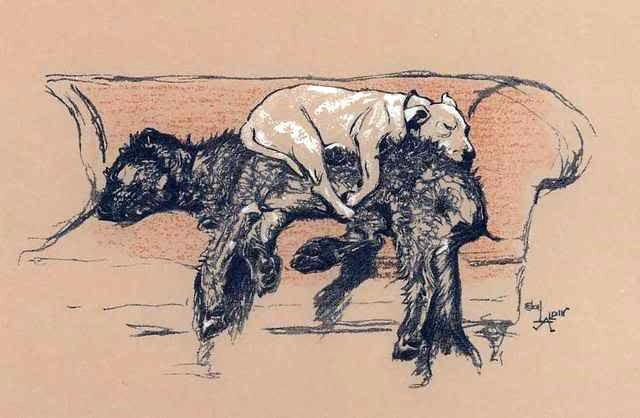
Pastel drawing of sleeping dogs

== Bibliography ==
- Hutchinson, H. N. Prehistoric Man and Beast (London: Smith Elder, 1896)
- Praed, W. Every-day Characters (London: Kegan Paul, 1896)
- Buckland, J. Two Little Runaways (London: Longmans, 1898)
- Spurr, H. A. A. Cockney in Arcadia (London: Allen, 1899)
- Aldin, C. C. W. Two Well-worn Shoe Stories (London: Sands, 1899)
- The Cecil Aldin hunting diary (1900)
- Whyte-Melville, G. J. Roy's Wife (London: Thacker, 1900)
- Hayward, G. M. The Other One (London: Pearson, 1901)
- Aldin, C. C. W. Ten Little Puppy Dogs (London: Sands, 1902)
- Emanuel, W. A Dog Day (London: William Heinemann, 1902)
- Aldin, C. C. W. A Sporting Garland, Sands, 1902)
- Emanuel, W. The Snob (London: Lawrence & Bullen, 1904)
- Aldin, C. C. W. A Gay Dog (London: William Heinemann, 1905)
- Emanuel, W. The Dogs of War (London: Bradbury, 1906)
- Heiberg, Neils. White-ear and Peter: the story of a fox and a fox-terrier (London: Macmillan, 1912).
- Byron, May. Cecil Aldin's merry party (London: Henry Frowde, Hodder and Stoughton, 1913).
- Maeterlinck, Maurice. My Dog (London: G. Allen, 1913).
- Waylett, Richard. The Doggie Book (New York: E.P. Dutton & Co., [1913]).
- Sewell, Anna. Black Beauty: the autobiography of a horse (London: Boots the Chemists, 1916).
- Emanuel, Walter Lewis. A dog day; or, The angel in the house (New York: E. P. Dutton & co., 1919).
- Aldin, C. Old Inns (London: Heinemann, 1921)
- Aldin, C. Old manor houses (London: W. Heinemann, 1920)
- Aldin, C. Cathedrals of England (London Eyre & Spottiswoode, 1924)
- Hare, Kenneth. Roads and vagabonds (London Eyre & Spottiswoode, 1930)
- Aldin, C. Time I Was Dead: Pages from My Autobiography (C. Scribner's sons, 1934)
