= George Charles Haité =

English painter

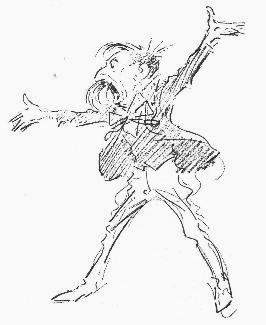
- Caricature of George Charles Haité by Tom Browne
- Born: George Charles Haité; 8 June 1855; Bexleyheath, England
- Died: 31 March 1924 (aged 68); London, England
- Known for: Painting, Illustration, Textile

George Charles Haité (8 June 1855 – 31 March 1924) was an English designer, painter, illustrator and writer. His most famous work is the iconic cover design of the Strand Magazine, launched in 1891, which helped popularise the Sherlock Holmes stories of Arthur Conan Doyle. Haité was also a founder member and the first president of the London Sketch Club.

== Life and Art ==
George Charles Haité was born in Bexleyheath, Kent, on 8 June 1855, the second child and eldest son of George Haité senior. His ancestors were French Huguenot immigrants, an awareness of which seems to have informed his later catchphrase that "art holds no nationality".

His great grandfather, William Haité, and his grandfather, Henry Haité, worked in the calico printing industry centred on the River Cray in Kent. Henry's brother, John, was also a textile designer, samples of whose "Spring Fashions for 1813" are to be found in the archives of the Victoria and Albert Museum.

His father, George Haité (1825–1871), was a prominent early Victorian cashmere shawl designer, albeit sadly so disillusioned with being a "slave of the fashion of the hour" that he actively discouraged his son from following him into the same profession. Ironically, it was his father's premature death of smallpox aged 45 that propelled G.C. to do just that when he found himself head of the household at the age of 16.

Haité would later comment in his own Who's Who entry that he was "absolutely self-taught" in art. After moving to London in the early 1870s he began making a name for himself as a wallpaper and carpet designer, later working in metal, tapestry and stained glass.

In 1883 he exhibited the first of many paintings at the Royal Academy. Haité worked in both oils and watercolours, specialising in landscapes with many executed on his travels to Venice, Morocco and Northern Europe. In 1897 his street scene of Dortmund won the Gold landscape prize at that year's Crystal Palace exhibition. He would usually sign his work "Geo C. Haité" or "G.C. Haité".

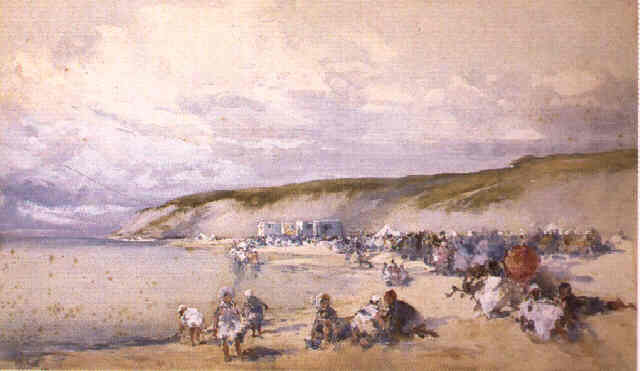
Cliffs (1900), watercolour by G. C. Haité

According to his friend, the great war correspondent Frederic Villiers: "I never met a man who was so rapid with brush and colours in transferring an impression to his canvas. His memory is so marvellously correct that one may watch him produce, within an hour or so, a sketch of a Dutch market-place with its greyness of atmosphere, a street in Bruges with the architectural beauty of its cathedral and houses, or a suburb in Tangier with its mosques and minarets glowing in the heat against a deep purple sky, as accurate in tone and drawing as if he had been seated in front of his subject."

As Villiers also commented, Haité was "one of the busiest men of his own little stage, for he is a president or fellow of some eight or nine art societies." Indeed, his talents would earn him membership of numerous art societies including the Royal Institute of Painters in Watercolours, the Royal Society of British Artists, the Royal Institute of Oil Painters, the Society of Miniature Painters, the Royal British Colonial Society of Artists, the National Association of House Painters and Decorators of England and Wales and, as president, the Institute of Decorative Designers.

Haité also wrote and lectured on art and design and in 1897 was elected president of the Nicolson Institute art gallery in Staffordshire. His inexhaustible social activities even stretched beyond the visual arts, also involved in the famous literary club the Sette of Odd Volumes (see below), one of the earliest members of the Japan Society of London and, from 1888, a Fellow of the Linnean Society.

== Illustration work and The Strand magazine ==
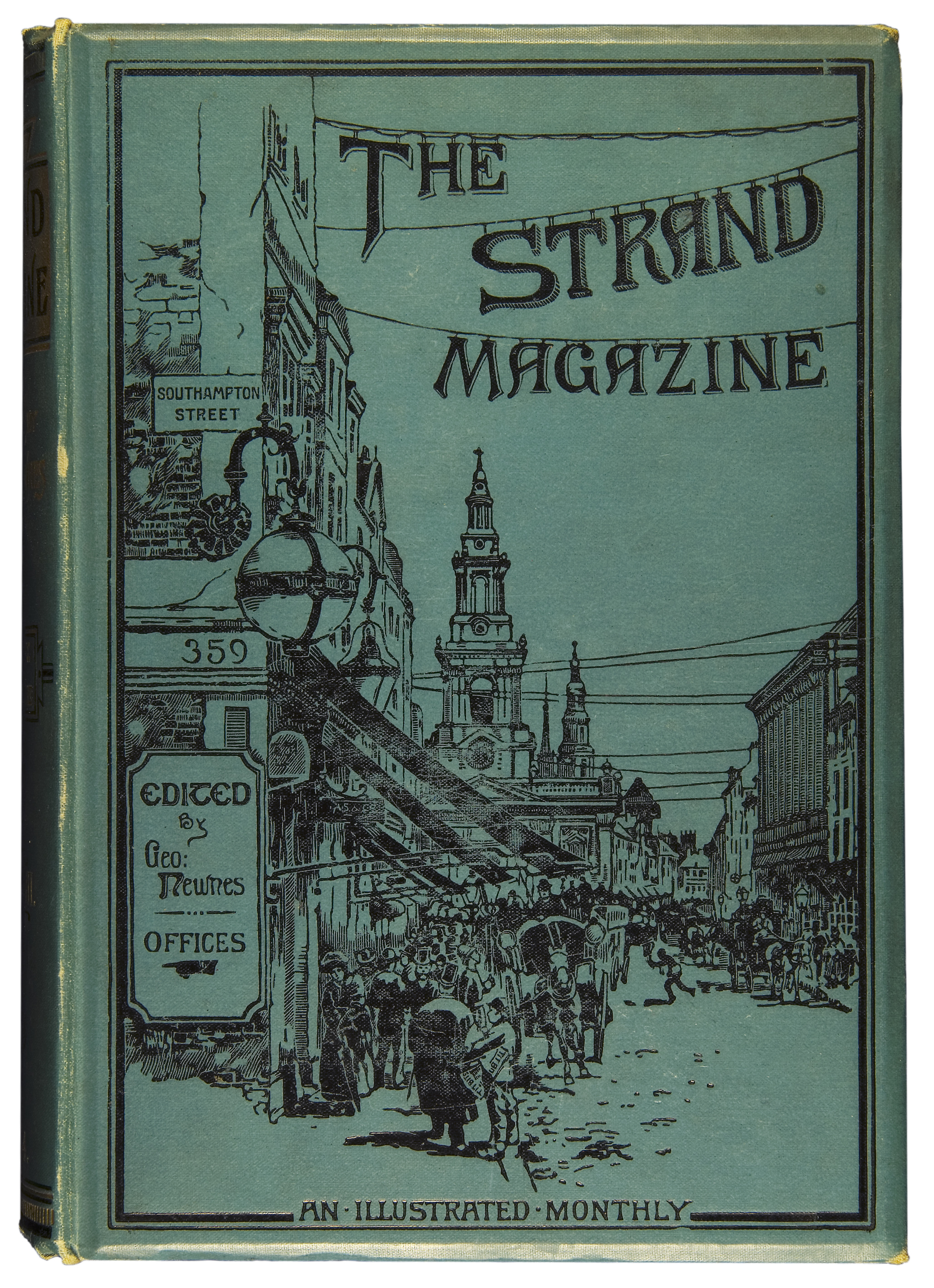
The Strand annual 1894

In 1886, Haité published Plant Studies for Artists, Designers and Art Students. Though it would be the only book solely written and illustrated by Haité, he edited and contributed drawings to numerous others including naturalist Edward Tickner Edwardes' Side-Lights of Nature in Quill and Crayon and In The Green Leaf and the Sere by the pseudonymous ornithologist "A Son of the Marshes".

In late 1890 he was asked by editor George Newnes to provide the cover pen and ink illustration for his new magazine The Strand, launched in January 1891. As sales of the magazine took off with the first of its Sherlock Holmes stories, beginning with A Scandal in Bohemia in the July 1891 issue, Haité's graphic rendering of London's Strand looking eastwards with the magazine title suspended from telegraph wires was destined to become an icon of late-Victorian publishing.

Variations of Haité's design were featured on its sister title, The Strand Musical Magazine, and on several Sherlock Holmes first edition bound volumes.

== The Sette of Odd Volumes and Oscar Wilde ==
In 1883, Haité was elected a member of the elite literary club the Sette of Odd Volumes. He became its annual vice-president in 1887 and president – known as "Oddship" – from 1891–92. Since the Sette addressed its members under individual titles pertaining to their interests or profession, Haité was referred to as "The Art-Critic". As president he fashioned his own medal shaped like a painter's palette and staged a then-novel "Phonograph Evening" where the members recorded their voices onto an Edison wax Phonograph cylinder. Even more revolutionary for the club, it was under Haité's presidency that the Sette broke with male-dominated tradition by staging its first mixed "Ladies Evening".

Other than its core membership of "Brothers", the Sette attracted many esteemed guests to its supper evenings and it was here that Haité met, among others, Jerome K. Jerome, Aubrey Beardsley, John Tenniel, Charles Dickens, Jr. and, on more than one occasion, Oscar Wilde.

There are records of at least four meetings with Wilde, the earliest being a report in the Pall Mall Gazette of a preliminary gathering of "The British Association of British Artists" at London's Grosvenor House on 8 June 1888: Haité was there representing "art applied to industry" while Wilde was present as editor of The Woman's World magazine. Fellow Sette member Edward Heron-Allen ("The Necromancer") also records Haité and Wilde in the same verse of a poem detailing a club dinner on 8 January 1890 when after Wilde's "gay and apt oration" Haité launched into a congratulatory "panegyric". At the following month's Sette meeting Haité's special guest was Oscar's brother, journalist Willie Wilde.

== The London Sketch Club ==
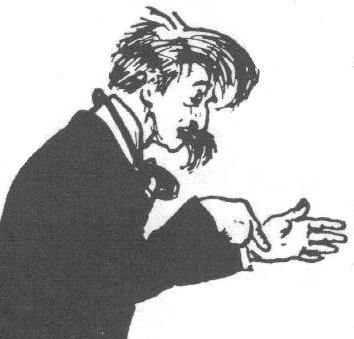
1899 London Sketch Club cartoon of Haité by Dudley Hardy

In the spring of 1898, Haité was instrumental in the formation of the London Sketch Club, a breakaway faction of the prestigious Langham Sketching Club where he had acted as president from 1883 until 1887. The catalyst for this split in ranks was a seemingly petty argument over hot or cold suppers. Those with a preference for hot suppers including Tom Browne, John Hassall, Dudley Hardy and Phil May left the Langham to create their own rebel drawing society. Haité was asked to join them as inaugural president and the London Sketch Club was formed, holding its first dinner on April Fool's Day.

Although Haité sat for a formal oil portrait by Frank O'Sullivan, it is through the many caricatures and drawings in the archives of the London Sketch Club that we have the most vivid representations of both his physical appearance and eccentric mannerisms, frequently depicted mid-oration, arms gesticulating wildly, hair on end and sporting an impressive Jimmy Finlayson-style soup-strainer moustache. Such was Haité's habit of speech-making it made him a frequent target of affectionate ribbing from other members. At the time of his presidency the club's supper guests included Robert Baden-Powell and Arthur Conan Doyle with whom Haité shared a love of cricket.

After four years as president Haité was persuaded to step down in 1902, after which the club would elect a new president every year. Despite his previous desertion, Haité was still welcomed at the Langham Sketching Club and would be re-elected its president one last time in 1908.

== Death and legacy ==
In 1883, Haité married Fanny Hodgkinson and settled in the new garden suburb of Bedford Park near Chiswick. He lived and worked at two separate addresses there, both of which he christened Ormsby Lodge. The couple had one daughter, Elsie Blanche Evelyn Frances Haité (1889–1971). An invalid for the last nine years of his life, Haité died on 31 March 1924. His widow Fanny remained at Ormsby Lodge, The Avenue, Bedford Park until her death in 1935.

A selection of work by both Haité and his namesake father can be viewed in the prints and drawings collection of the Victoria and Albert museum, Kensington, London.
