= Tom Browne (illustrator) =

British painter and illustrator (1870–1910)

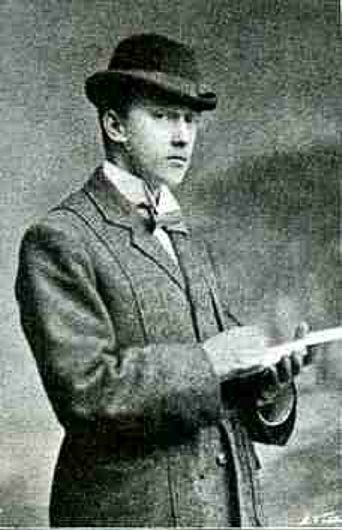
Portrait of Tom Browne, c. 1900

Tom Browne RI, born Thomas Arthur Browne (8 December 1870 – 16 May 1910), was an extremely popular English strip cartoonist, painter and illustrator of the late Victorian and Edwardian periods. He often signed his work as Tom B.

== Early life ==
Born in Nottingham, the son of Francis Browne, a painter, the young Browne started earning a wage as a milliner's errand boy in 1882. He attended the St Mary's Church of England National school until the age of eleven, when he was apprenticed for seven years to a lithographic printer, a lowly paid position, but began to make a living by selling freelance cartoons to London comic papers. He received thirty shillings for his first strip, published by the magazine Scraps, and called "He Knew How To Do It". At the time of the census of 1891, Browne was twenty and was living in lodgings in central Nottingham. He was described as a lithographic designer, and living at the same address were John Clarkson, a lithographic artist, and Lucy Pares, a lace maker, who was a visitor. On 14 May 1892, Browne married Pares in Nottingham.

== Career ==
In 1890, Alfred Harmsworth had founded a new British comic book called Comic Cuts. Cheaply printed, it proved to be the ideal medium for Browne's bold drawing style. His comic strips soon became so popular that he moved to London and into a studio in Wollaton House at Westcombe Park. There, he turned out six full-page strips a week, but also produced illustrations for several British magazines. His cartoons appeared in Punch, The Tatler and other highly-rated periodicals of the day. In 1898 Browne became a member of the Royal British Society of Artists and in 1901 was elected to the Royal Institute of Painters in Water Colours, which meant he could use the letters RI after his name.

Browne was a founding member of the London Sketch Club, formed in 1898, and was publicly acclaimed. The stimulating experience of these regular get-togethers, alongside other founding members including Dudley Hardy and Phil May, was seminal in its influence on British commercial art. His cycling trips took him all over the world, while illustrations of these exploits appeared in the newspapers. Returning to Nottingham, he started a colour printing firm and joined the Volunteer Force.

The logo of Johnnie Walker whiskey, the strutting, monocled character, was created by Browne in 1908. He also created the comic strip Weary Willie and Tired Tim, inspired by Don Quixote and Sancho Panza, which appeared on the front page of Illustrated Chips from 1896 to 1953. Browne played a major part in the evolution of the British comic style, influencing Bruce Bairnsfather, Dudley Watkins and Leo Baxendale. His strip 'Airy Alf and Bouncing Billy' first appeared in The Big Budget around 1900, and was later continued by Ralph Hodgson under the pen name of "Yorick". His comic, Dan Leno, portrayed the Victorian English music hall comedian and appeared in Dan Leno's Comic Journal in 1898. More of his characters were 'Little Willy and Tiny Tim', 'Mr. Stankey Deadstone and Company', 'The Rajah', and 'Don Quixote de Tintogs'. Echoes of his impudent urchins can still be seen in The Beano and The Dandy today.

In an article published in 1903, Browne said “I do alleged humorous drawings… I have done some thousands of them, probably, yet normally I am a sober, almost melancholy, individual, and I started out in life with the ambition to paint big devotional pictures.”

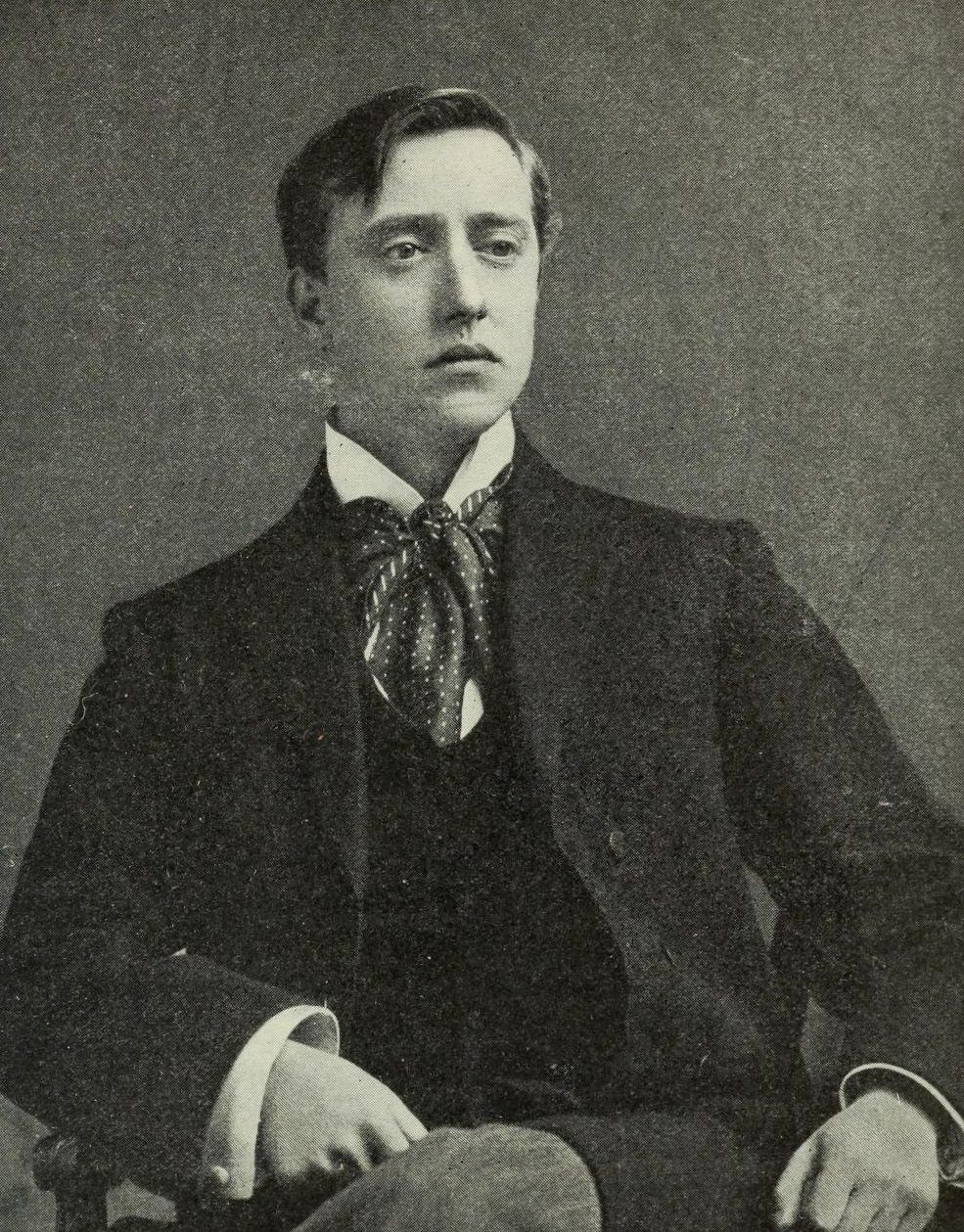
Browne pictured in 1903

After surgery for cancer, Browne died at home, Wollaton, Hardy Road, Westcombe Park, then in Kent, on 16 May 1910. He left a widow, Lucy Browne, and an estate valued at £18,529, equivalent to £1,887,031 in 2025. He was buried at Shooter's Hill with military honours, as at the time of his death he held a commission in the Woolwich Territorials. A year later, his widow was at the same address with their three children, Dorothy, aged 17, Elsie, aged 15, and a son, Noel, 11. The house was later lived in by the artist John Bratby.

== Gallery ==
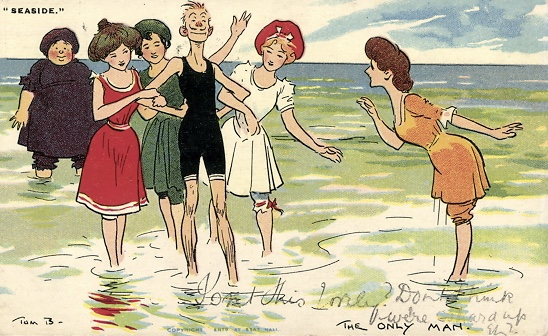
Tom Browne, Seaside – the Only Man

The Squire Gives a Harvest Supper, c. 1907

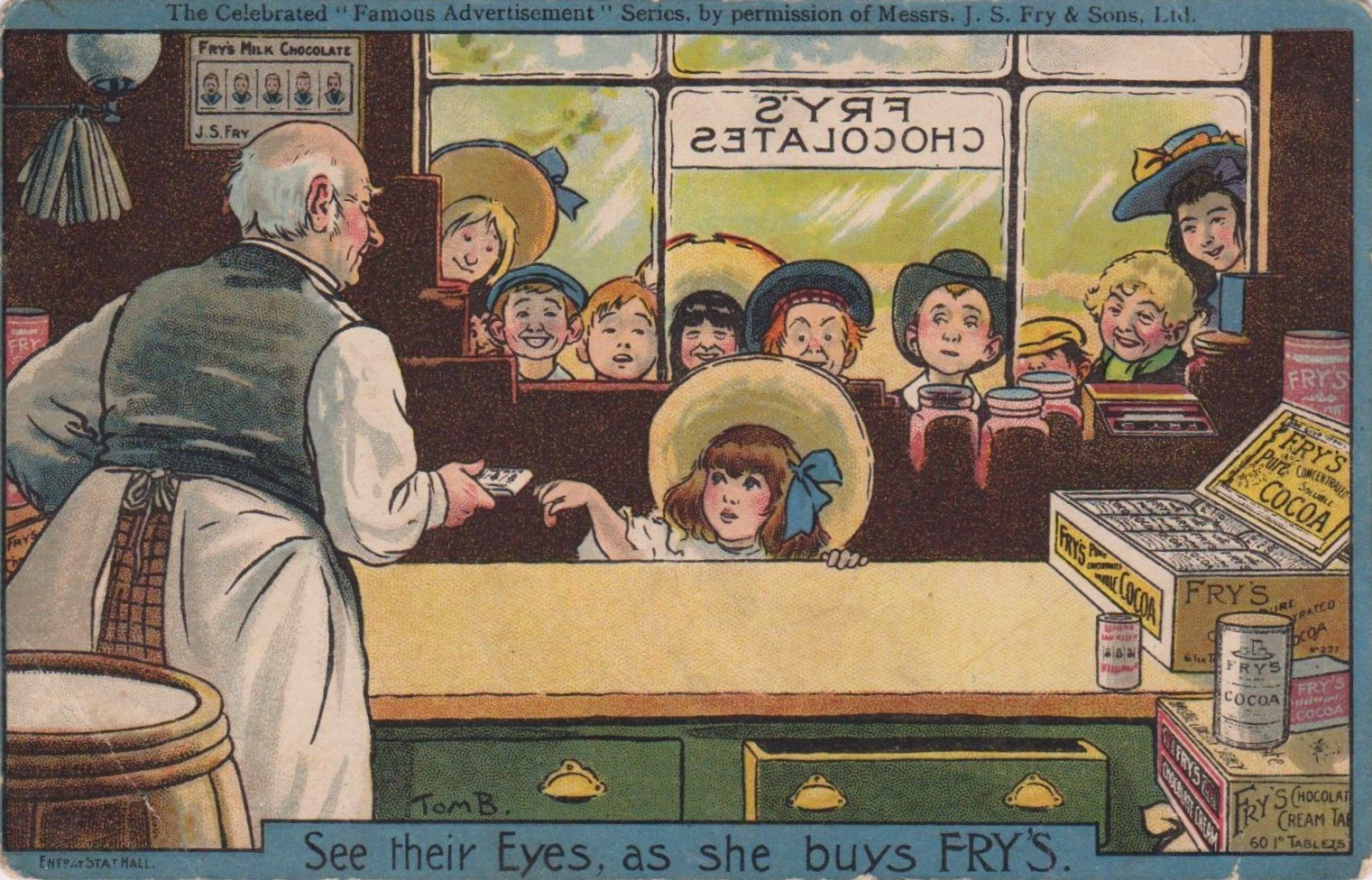
See Their Eyes, as She Buys Fry's

Illustrated Sports: Polo

The Art of Leaving One’s Purse At Home

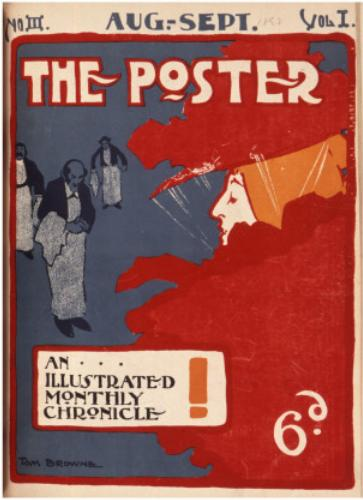
Cover art for The Poster (1898)

My Patent Buffer

The Major General

Overflowing with Good Stories

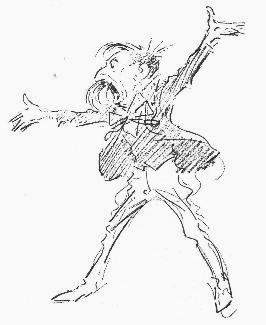
Caricature of George Charles Haité

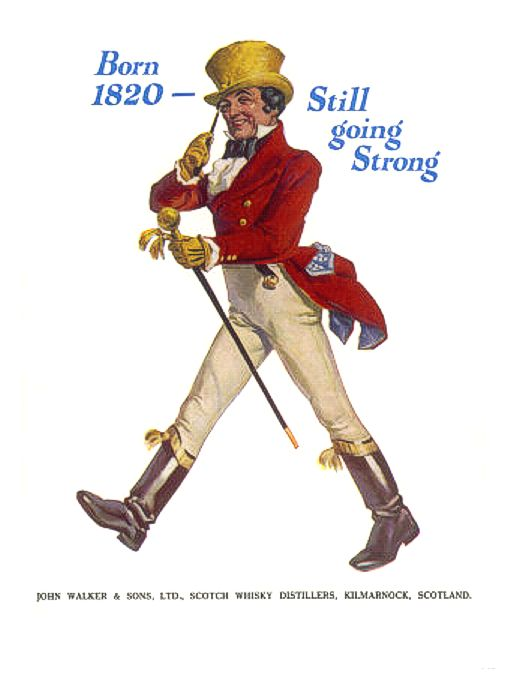
Johnnie Walker logo
