= London Sketch Club =

London members' club

Coordinates: 51°29′5.02″N 0°9′36.02″W

The London Sketch Club
- Formation: 1898; 128 years ago
- Founder: Dudley Hardy, Phil May, Cecil Aldin, Walter Churcher, Tom Browne
- Type: Private members' club for artists
- Headquarters: London, England
- Location: 7 Dilke Street, Chelsea
- Hon. Sec.: Mark Prizeman
- Website: www.londonsketchclub.com

The London Sketch Club is a private members' club for artists working in the field of commercial graphic art, mainly for newspapers, periodicals, and books.

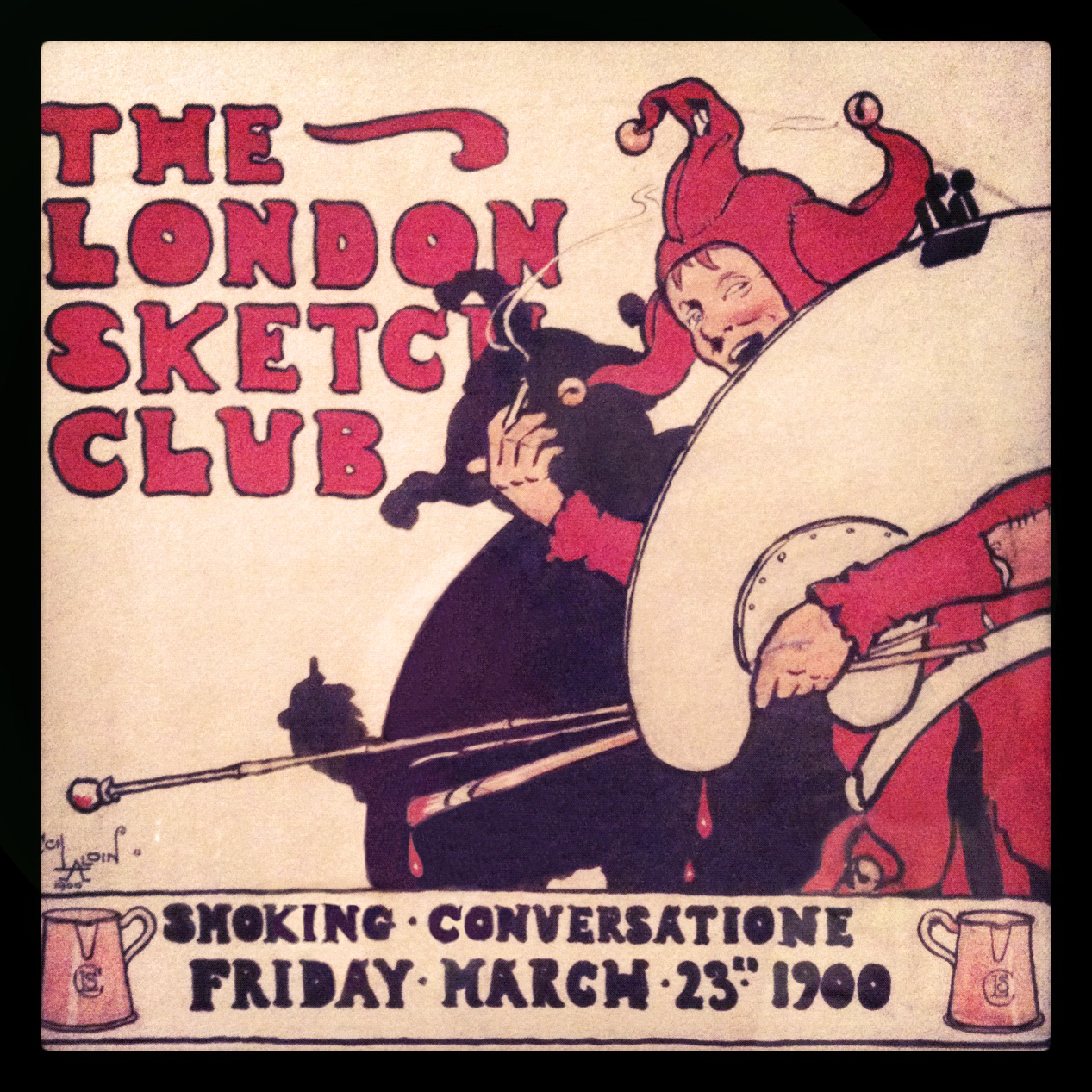
1900 invitation to one of the regular "smoking" evenings at the club.

== History ==
The club was founded in 1898 by a breakaway group of members from the Langham Sketching Club, following a disagreement over whether to have hot or cold suppers after an evening's drawing. The founding members were Dudley Hardy, Phil May, Cecil Aldin, Walter Churcher, and Tom Browne. George Charles Haité was its first president.

A joint exhibition with the Langham Sketching Club was held at the Mall Galleries in 1976.

For a while in the late 1970s, the Society of Strip Illustration held its monthly meetings at the Sketch Club.

== Clubhouse ==
The club relocated in 1903 from its original location to premises in Wells Street, off Oxford Street. In 1957, the club moved to 7 Dilke Street in Chelsea.

== Members ==
- Salomon van Abbé
- Cecil Aldin
- H. M. Bateman
- James Bateman (artist)
- Arnold Beauvais
- Tom Browne (illustrator)
- Fred Buchanan
- René Bull
- Terence Cuneo
- George Charles Haité
- Edmund Dulac
- Dudley Hardy
- John Hassall (illustrator)
- Frederick Hamilton Jackson
- David Langdon
- Alfred Leete
- Horatio Joseph Lucas
- Ley Kenyon
- Phil May (caricaturist)
- Christopher Nevinson
- George Parlby
- Bertram Prance
- James Pryde
- Charles Robinson (illustrator)
- W. Heath Robinson
- Gyrth Russell
- Lance Thackeray

== See also ==
- List of London's gentlemen's clubs

== Bibliography ==
- Philippe Kaenel (2005). Le métier d'illustrateur, 1830-1880: Rodolphe Töpffer, J-J Grandville, Gustave Doré (in French) (2 ed.). Librairie Droz. p. 543. ISBN 978-2-600-00531-9.
- The Pall Mall Gazette 2 April 1898
- Thévoz, Seth Alexander (2025). London Clubland: A Companion for the Curious. London: Robinson/Little, Brown. ISBN 978-1472149985.
