= Gyrth Russell =

Anglo-Canadian artist

- Born: 30 April 1892; Dartmouth, Nova Scotia, Canada
- Died: 8 December 1970 (aged 78); Penarth, Wales
- Known for: Painter

Gyrth Russell (30 April 1892 - 8 December 1970) was an Anglo-Canadian artist best known for his marine paintings and work as a war artist during the First World War.

== Early life ==
Russell was born in Dartmouth, Nova Scotia, the youngest son of the politician and jurist Benjamin Russell. He studied at Halifax School of Art and at Boston, before studying in Paris at the Académie Julian and the Académie Colarossi.

== First World War ==
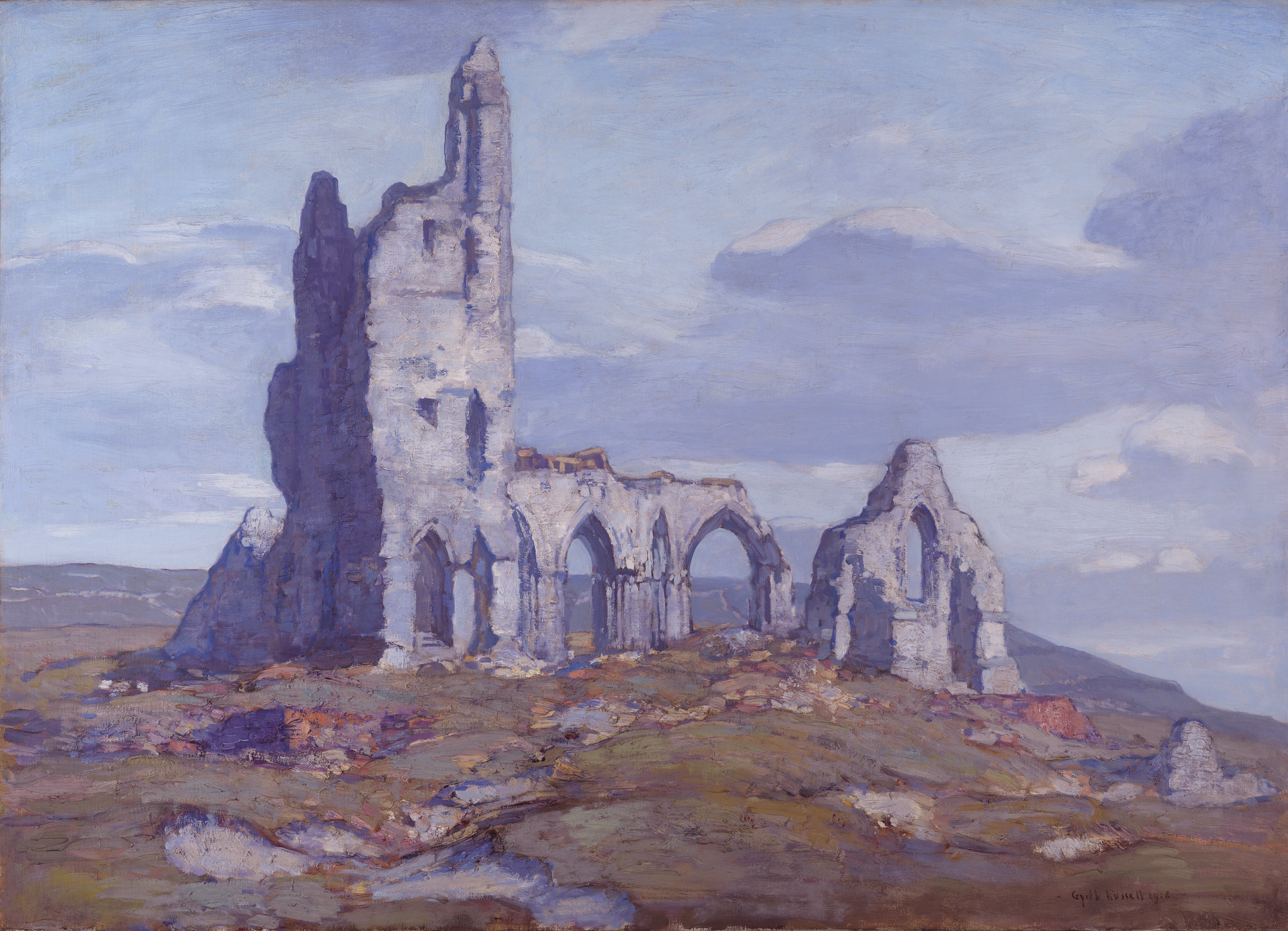
Ablain-St-Nazaire (1918)

Russell was commissioned as a Canadian official war artist and a range of his paintings and drawings, produced in northern France, are now in the collection of the Canadian War Museum. Russell painted views of Vimy Ridge, Arras and St Nazaire as shattered and devastated landscapes. Russell's works were exhibited at the Canadian War Memorial Exhibition in London in 1919.

== Interwar ==
Russell remained in Britain after the war. He joined the Langham Sketch Club and was elected to membership of the Royal Society of British Artists, Royal Institute of Oil Painters, Royal Institute of Painters in Watercolours and the Royal Society of Marine Artists. In 1927, Russell illustrated Lawrence du Garde Peach's book, Forgotten Devon.

== World War II and after ==
During World War II, Russell served as an acting petty officer in the Royal Naval Patrol Service, later he became a visiting lecturer at Doncaster School of Art, living in Yorkshire before moving to Wales in the 1950s. Russell produced a series of posters for the Great Western Railway and British Railways, including views of Scarborough, Whitby and Fountains Abbey. He wrote two instructional books on painting, See and Paint (1957) and An introduction to oil painting (1959).
