= Kodak Girl =

Advertising figure used by Eastman Kodak

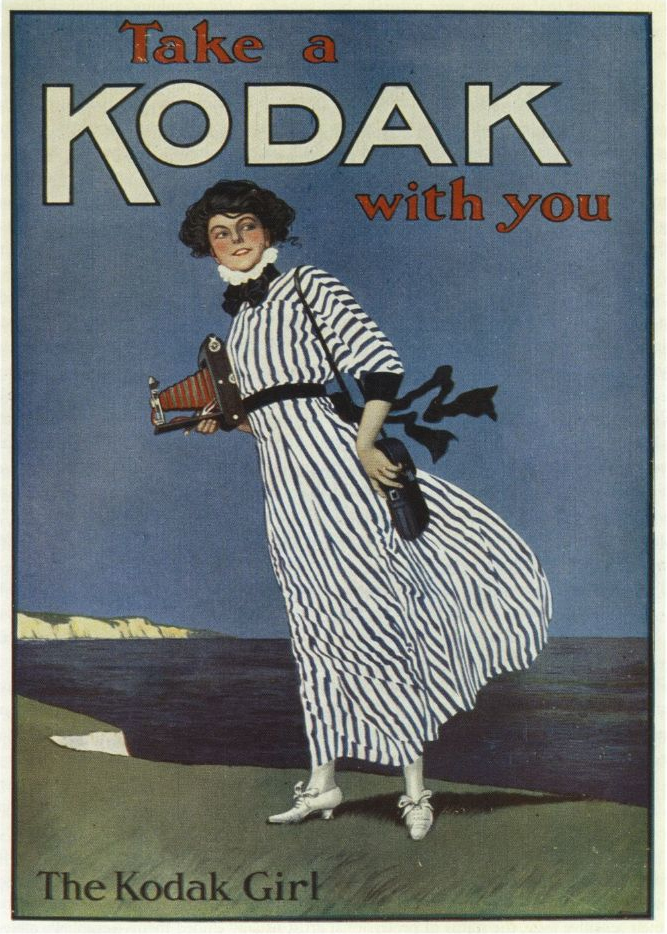
The Kodak Girl, holding a No. 3A Folding Pocket Kodak, in a 1910 poster by John Hassall

The Kodak Girl was a recurring female character used in advertising by the Eastman Kodak Company from the early 1890s until the mid-twentieth century. Usually depicted as a young woman carrying a Kodak camera in outdoor or leisure settings, she became one of the best-known figures in the history of photographic advertising. The character appeared in posters, magazine advertisements, catalogues, postcards, and promotional displays throughout the United States and abroad.

The character was introduced during a period when Kodak was transforming photography from a specialised pursuit into a mass consumer activity. Her image helped associate photography with tourism, recreation, fashion, and family life, while simultaneously encouraging women to become camera users rather than merely photographic subjects. Historians of photography and advertising have identified the Kodak Girl as one of the earliest and most successful examples of long-term corporate brand personification.

== History ==
=== Origins ===
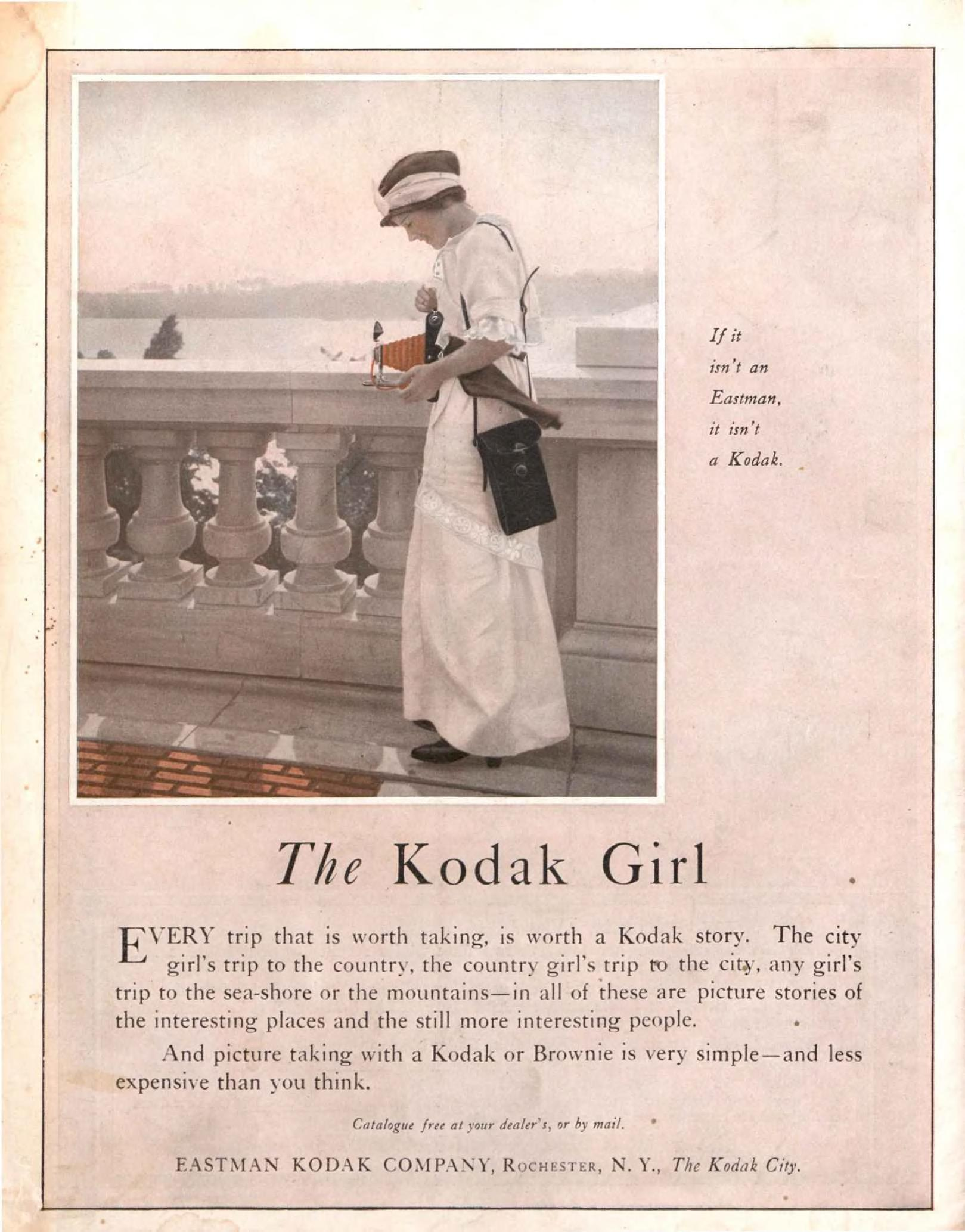
The Kodak Girl advertisement, The Saturday Evening Post, 4 July 1914

The origins of the Kodak Girl lay in the rapid expansion of amateur photography following the introduction of Eastman Kodak's lightweight, easy-to-use camera and roll-film. The advertising strategy emphasised simplicity and convenience, encapsulated in the company's slogan, "You Press the Button, We Do the Rest". As portable cameras became easier to use, Kodak sought new audiences beyond professional photographers and dedicated amateurs. The character's target audience for advertising was young, white, middle-class women, an emerging demographic with leisure and purchasing power.

Starting in 1893, Kodak advertisements increasingly featured a young woman carrying a camera and participating in modern leisure activities, with advertising showing two women photographing sights at the Chicago World's Fair. According to the photographic historian Nancy Martha West, Kodak deliberately targeted women consumers, presenting photography as both fashionable and compatible with everyday life. The campaign proved highly successful and helped broaden the market for snapshot photography.

Unlike many contemporary advertisements for photographic equipment, which emphasised technical specifications, Kodak's campaigns focused on life experiences. The character was usually shown outdoors, frequently on her own although sometimes with another Kodak Girl, without an accompanying man, and carrying a discreet Folding Pocket Kodak camera. She was shown travelling, sightseeing, attending fairs, spending time at beaches and parks, and documenting social occasions. Such imagery linked photography to mobility and leisure rather than to male-dominated scientific expertise; cameras were presented not as technical instruments requiring specialist knowledge but as personal accessories that could be carried with ease. Kodak associated the simplicity of roll film and camera with the apparent independence, adventurousness and freedoms of the "New Woman". The character provided women with an idealised image of youthful feminine exuberance and joy through photography.

=== Expansion ===
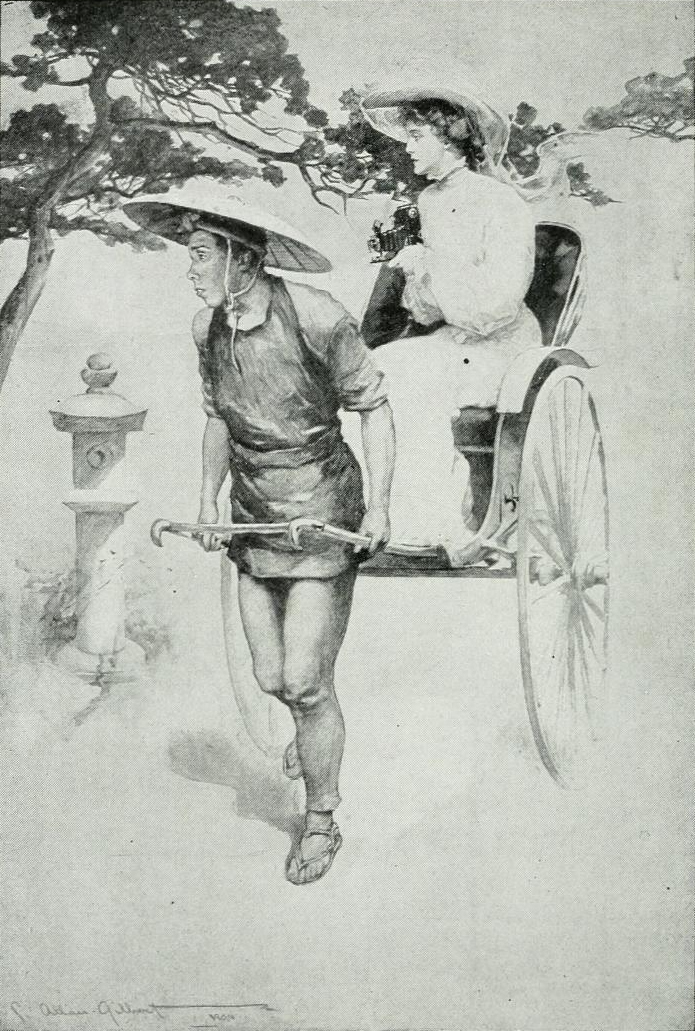
The Kodak Girl in Fair Japan, drawn by C. Allen Gilbert for the Eastman Kodak Co., c. 1905.

By the start of the twentieth century, the Kodak Girl had become a recognisable component of Kodak's visual identity. Advertisements appeared in newspapers, magazines, railway stations, and public spaces throughout North America and Europe. Although the character was adapted to local markets, certain visual conventions remained remarkably consistent. Among the most familiar representations was a young woman dressed in a striped blue-and-white outfit, a dress or swimsuit of whatever period she represents, carrying a compact camera while exploring the modern world. The character often appeared unaccompanied or in the company of other women, a notable departure from Victorian advertising conventions that frequently portrayed women in domestic settings.

Illustrators rather than photographers initially created most Kodak Girl imagery. The resulting images blended elements of commercial art, fashion illustration, and travel promotion, helping to establish a visual language that Kodak employed for decades. Advertising slogans accompanying her included:

- Take a Kodak with you
- Springtime is Kodak time
- All outdoors invites your Kodak
- Don't forget your Kodak
- Save your happy memories with a Kodak
- Have you ever thought how much you miss by not having a Kodak?
- Don't let another week-end slip by without a Kodak

=== The Kodak Girl and the "New Woman" ===
The rise of the Kodak Girl coincided with broader social changes affecting middle-class women in Europe and North America. During the late nineteenth century, increasing numbers of women participated in higher education, travel, organised recreation, and consumer culture. Historians have therefore frequently connected the character with the contemporary ideal of the "New Woman". Many advertisements depicted her cycling, hiking, boating, or travelling independently. These images suggested that photography could accompany modern forms of mobility and self-expression.

Historians have cautioned against interpreting the character solely as a symbol of female emancipation: she was created to sell cameras, film and printing, and her independence generally remained within the boundaries of respectable middle-class consumer culture. The Kodak Girl represented both changing opportunities for women and Kodak's commercial interest in expanding its customer base.

=== Public reception ===
The Kodak Girl

She is delicate and sweet,
She is pretty and petite,
Her hair is either fluffy or in curl;
And a man of any taste
Would go far to clasp her waist
While her dainty ankles made your senses whirl.

When I see her calm and bland
With a Kodak in her hand
Preparing to take a snapshot, sun or rain,
My eyes have snapped her face
In its witchery and grace
And have printed it in colors on my brain.

How I hope that in her glee
She has had a shot at me
With the Kodak which she carries in her hand.

For I know my photograph
in her eyes will loving laugh
When she puts it on the mantle in a stand.

— William E. S. Fales, Photo-Beacon, February 1902

Contemporary commentary often portrayed the character as an object for male admiration. The 1901 Broadway musical The New Yorkers included a song "The Kodak Girl", featuring the lines "Isn't she a dream divine?/When she's coming down the line/Does she set your heart awhirl?"

The photography magazine Photo-Beacon featured a poem about her in 1902, whose author fantasises that the "pretty and petite" Kodak Girl will photograph him.

A 1905 engineering textbook pointed out that "almost every magazine reader knows 'The Kodak Girl' so well that he would be pleased to meet her in real life, and learn if she is just as nice as she appears."

In the early 1900s the character, often with her striped dress, would be the inspiration for young women's outfits for fancy-dress balls. In a lecture to a London School of Economics audience, Thomas Russell noted that by 1919 "[t]he famous Kodak Girl, in her flying skirts and her stripes ... actually influenced fashion at the time: women were everywhere seen in striped frocks."

=== Interwar advertising ===
Following the First World War, the character evolved significantly during the 1920s and 1930s. As photography became increasingly commonplace, Kodak shifted its emphasis away from introducing the new technology, and towards integrating it into everyday life. By the 1920s, the character's independence had decreased, and she was shown using her camera to photograph a family at play.

Advertisements from this period often treated cameras as fashion accessories. Products such as the "Vanity Kodak Ensemble" camera (introduced in 1926 and available in five colours: "seagull" (grey), "cockatoo" (green), "robin" (red), "bluebird" (blue), and "sparrow" (brown), allowing women to coordinate their outfit with the model of their choice), were marketed alongside cosmetics and personal accessories. West argues that such campaigns reinforced Kodak's association between photography, personal appearance, and modern consumer identity.

Illustrated Kodak Girls gradually gave way to photographic models, reflecting broader changes in advertising practice. Nevertheless, the underlying themes remained consistent: photography was presented as an enjoyable activity closely connected to travel, friendship, courtship, and family life.

=== Decline ===
After the Second World War, Kodak increasingly emphasised family photography rather than a single recurring advertising figure. Campaigns focused on children, holidays, birthdays, and domestic memory-making. Although women continued to appear prominently in Kodak advertising, the distinct Kodak Girl character became less visible. By the 1950s and 1960s, the figure had largely disappeared as a coherent brand identity, although models such as Cybill Shepherd were still used to pose for life-size cardboard store poster displays, reminding customers to stock their film supply before the holidays. Her influence nevertheless survived in Kodak's continued emphasis on snapshots, personal memories, and the emotional value of photography.

== Cultural significance ==
The Kodak Girl occupies an important place in the history of advertising, photography, and gender representation. Advertising historians have identified the character as an early example of lifestyle marketing. Rather than promoting cameras primarily through technical advantages, Kodak associated photography with desirable experiences and emotional rewards. Through repeated campaigns, the company encouraged consumers to think of photographs as records of happy occasions, family relationships, and personal memories.

Later, Kodak encouraged women to be responsible mothers and wives by becoming the memory keepers of the family and ensuring all the key family moments were captured – birthdays, first steps, holidays, graduations. It was up to women to make sure that happened.

West has argued that Kodak advertising helped shape modern understandings of memory itself. In her interpretation, Kodak's marketing encouraged people to document pleasurable experiences while excluding grief, conflict, and other aspects of life that had often appeared in nineteenth-century photography. The character became one of the principal visual symbols of this transformation.

The character has also attracted attention from scholars of gender and consumer culture. Some have emphasised the opportunities represented by the image of a woman confidently using new technology in public spaces. Others have noted that Kodak's campaigns frequently linked photography to conventional expectations concerning femininity, appearance, and domestic life. As a result, the character has been interpreted both as a symbol of modern female independence and as a product of commercial advertising aimed at middle-class consumers.

== Legacy ==
The Kodak Girl remains one of the most widely studied figures in the history of photographic advertising. Original posters, catalogues, and promotional illustrations are preserved in museum and archival collections, including those of the Smithsonian Institution and photographic museums devoted to the history of imaging technology.

Her image continues to appear in exhibitions and scholarly discussions of consumer culture, women's history, and the development of amateur photography. Historians generally regard the Kodak Girl as one of the most successful advertising characters of the early twentieth century and as an important symbol of the transition from photography as a specialised craft to photography as an everyday social practice.

== See also ==
- Eastman Kodak Company
- George Eastman
- History of photography
- New Woman
- Snapshot (photography)

== Sources ==
- "Alison" (7 October 2013). "The Kodak Girl: Women in Kodak Advertising". Toronto Metropolitan University Archives & Special Collections. Toronto Metropolitan University.
- Brayer, Elizabeth (2006). George Eastman: A Biography. University of Rochester Press. ISBN 978-1580462471.
- Greenough, Sarah; Waggoner, Diane; Witkovsky, Matthew S.; Kennel, Sarah (2007). The Art of the American Snapshot, 1888-1978: from the collection of Robert E. Jackson. Washington, DC: National Gallery of Art; Princeton, NJ: Princeton University Press. ISBN 9780894683435.
- International Library of Technology: A Series of Textbooks for Persons Engaged in the Engineering Professions and Trades, Or for Those who Desire Information Concerning Them. Vol. 61. International Textbook Company. 1905.
- Mounfield, Lucy (2021). ""Petits bijoux de couleur". La féminisation du marketing des appareils Kodak" [Little Gems of Color: Kodak, Camera Design as Fashion, and the Gendering of Photography]. Transbordeur (in French). 5. Association Transbordeur, Éditions Macula: 74–85. doi:10.4000/12gz6. ISBN 978-2-86589-129-0. ISSN 3073-5734.
- Munir, Kamal (26 February 2012). "The Demise of Kodak: Five Reasons". The Wall Street Journal.
- Palmquist, Peter, ed. (1989). Camera Fiends & Kodak Girls: 50 Selections by and about Women in Photography, 1840-1930. New York: Midmarch Arts Press. ISBN 978-1877675003.
- Turnbow, Diana (21 November 2023). "Before Instagram, There Was Kodak". Smithsonian American Women's History Museum. Smithsonian.
- West, Nancy Martha (2000). Kodak and the Lens of Nostalgia. Charlottesville: University Press of Virginia. ISBN 978-0813919584.
- Wingo, Rebecca S.; Tilton, Lauren, eds. (2026). US History in 15 Photographs: 1865 to the 21st century. Bloomsbury Academic. ISBN 978-1350463387.
