= Tom Beauvais =

British artist (1932–2024)

Thomas Charles Victor Beauvais (1932 – 27 April 2024) was a British artist, best known for film posters.

== Life and career ==
Beauvais was born in Belsize Park, North London in 1932, the son of Arnold Beauvais.

He designed the poster for the 1969 film Butch Cassidy and the Sundance Kid, and also designed and illustrated the UK poster for Mad Max in 1979.

Beauvais died on 27 April 2024, at the age of 91.
