= John Hassall (illustrator) =

English illustrator (1868–1948)

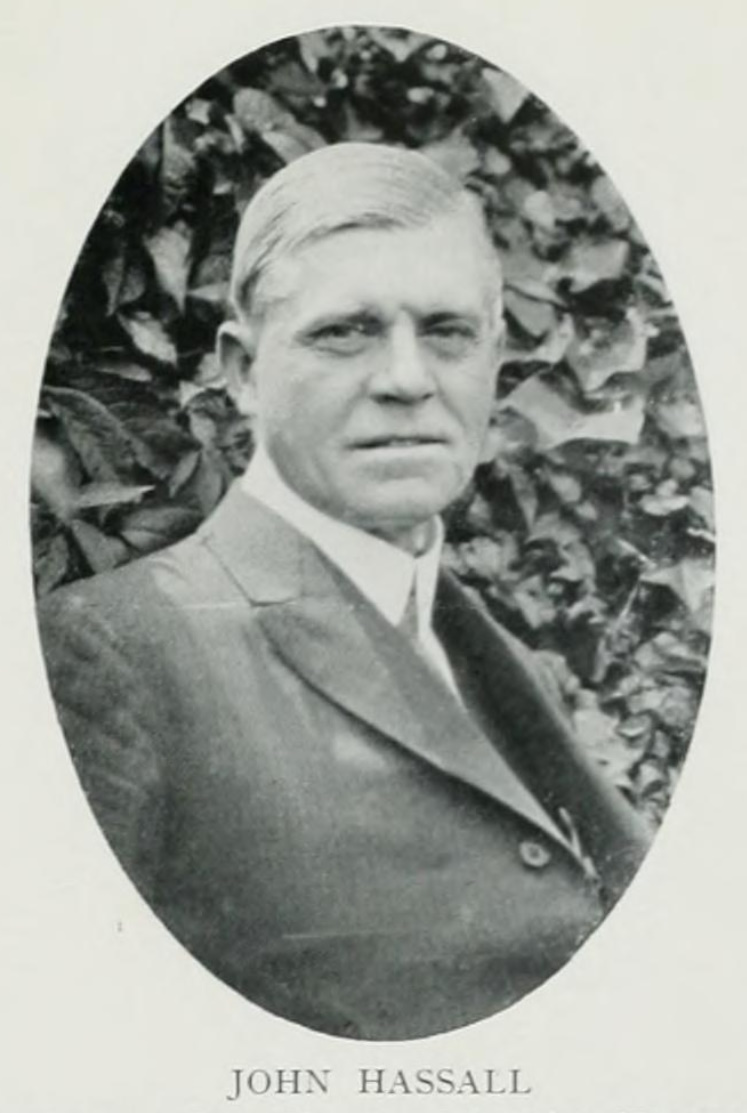
- John Hassall, photographed in about 1922.
- Born: John Hassall; 21 May 1868; Walmer, Kent
- Died: 8 March 1948 (aged 79); North Kensington, London
- Occupations: Artist, illustrator, cartoonist, painter
- Spouse(s): (1) ---- (2) Constance Brooke-Webb

John Hassall RI (21 May 1868 – 8 March 1948) was an English illustrator known for his advertisements and poster designs.

== Biography ==
John Hassall was born in Walmer, Kent on 21 May 1868, the eldest son of Lieutenant Christopher Clark Hassall R. N., of a Cheshire family of wine-merchants, and his wife, Louisa, daughter of the Rev. Joseph Butterworth Owen, incumbent of St. Jude's, Chelsea. Hassall's early life was marked by tragedy; his father, who had served in the fleet at the siege of Sevastapol, was paralysed as the result of an accident on board ship. He died at the age of thirty-eight. His mother later remarried an officer in the Royal Marines at Chatham, Sir William Purvis Wright, K.C.B., who eventually rose to the rank of General

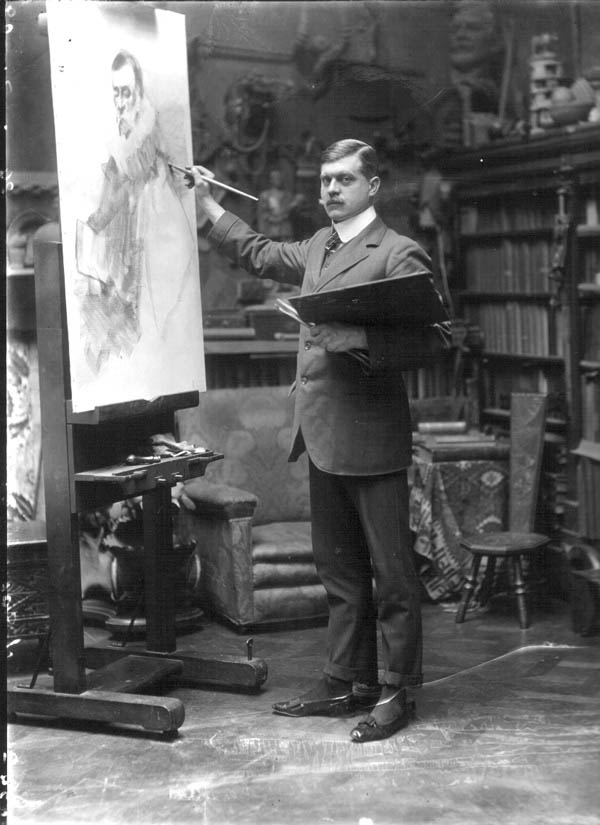
Hassall in his studio, 1909

Hassall was educated in Worthing, at Newton Abbot College, and at Neuenheim College, Heidelberg. After twice failing to gain entry to the Royal Military College, Sandhurst, in 1888 he emigrated to Manitoba in Canada to begin farming with his brother Owen. He returned to London two years later when he had drawings accepted by The Graphic. At the suggestion of Dudley Hardy and Cecil Aldin, a lifelong friend, Hassall studied art in Antwerp under Charles Van Havermaet and Paris. During this time he was influenced by the famous poster artist Alphonse Mucha.

In 1895 Hassall began work as an advertising artist for David Allen & Sons, a career which lasted fifty years and included such well-known projects as the poster "Skegness Is so Bracing" (1908). Between 1896 and 1899 alone, he produced over 600 theatre poster designs for this firm while, at the same time, providing illustrations to several illustrated newspapers. Making use of flat colours enclosed by thick black lines, his poster style was very suitable for children's books, and he produced many volumes of nursery rhymes and fairy stories, such as Mother Goose's Nursery Rhymes (1909).

In 1901, Hassall was elected to the membership of the Royal Institute of Painters in Water Colours and the Royal Society of Miniature Painters. He also belonged to several clubs, including the Langham (until 1898), the Savage, and the London Sketch Club, of which he was a President from 1903-1904. He belonged to the literary club The Sette of Odd Volumes and illustrated their privately printed menus, including one of a broken bust of Jane Austen for the club's "Night of the Divine Jane" in 1902.

In 1900 Hassall opened his own New Art School and School of Poster Design in Kensington where he numbered Annie Fish, Bert Thomas, Bruce Bairnsfather, H. M. Bateman and Harry Rountree among his students. The school was closed at the outbreak of the First World War. In the post-war period, he ran the very successful John Hassall Correspondence School.

John Hassall was the father of poet Christopher Hassall and the printmaker Joan Hassall, OBE. He was also the grandfather of the actress Imogen Hassall and grandfather (and surrogate father) to noted "green" architect, David Dobereiner.

== Works ==
Arguably John Hassall's most famous creation was "The Jolly Fisherman" in 1908, which is regarded as one of the most famous holiday advertisements of all time in the United Kingdom. His 1910 design for the Kodak Girl, in her iconic striped blue and white dress, became a feature of Kodak's advertising to the 1970s. Hassall's design was continually updated to reflect changing fashions and trends and was longer-lasting and of greater international significance than his Jolly Fisherman.

Selected works
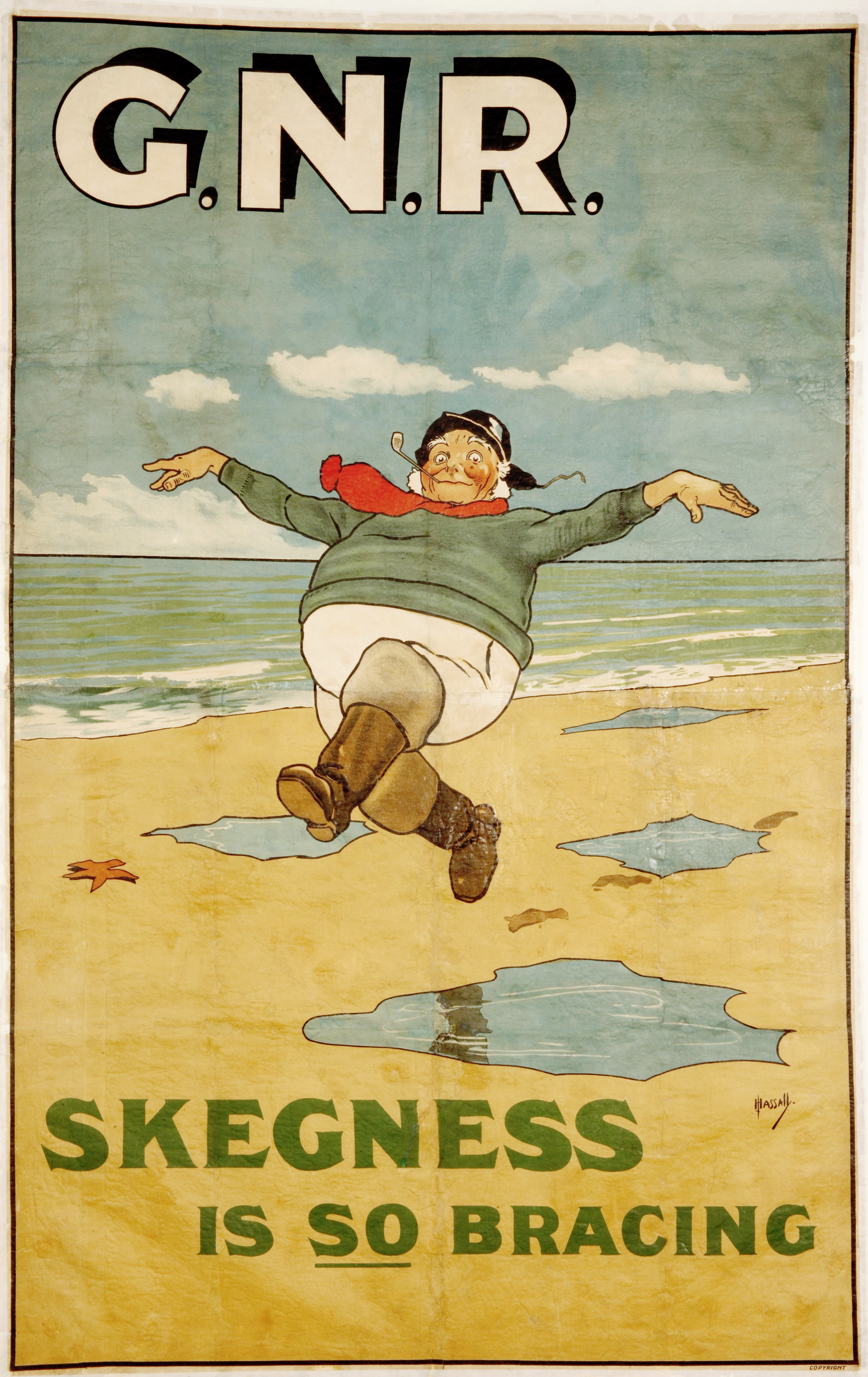
"The Jolly Fisherman" in a 1908 poster

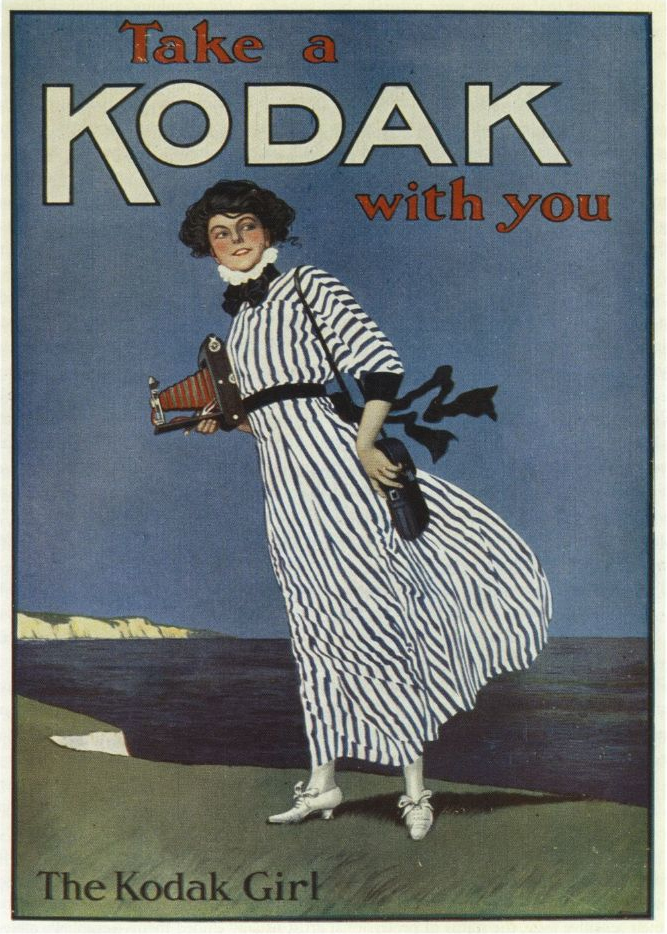
The Kodak Girl in a 1910 poster

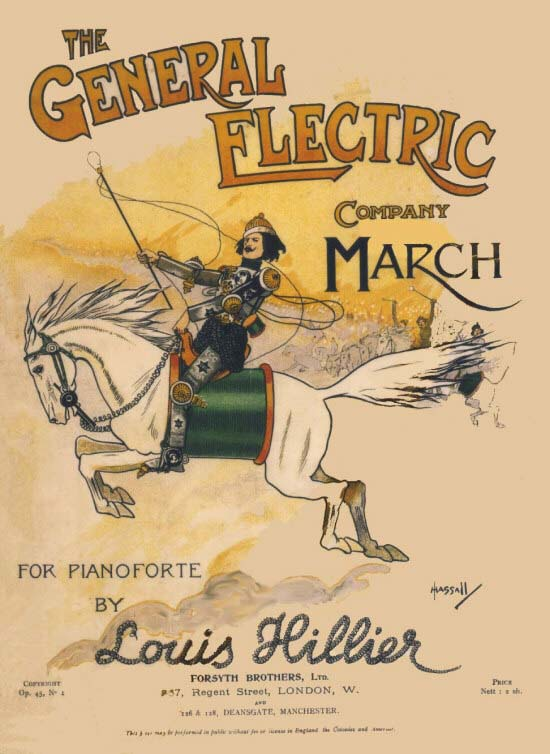
Louis Hillier's "General Electric Company March" (1904)

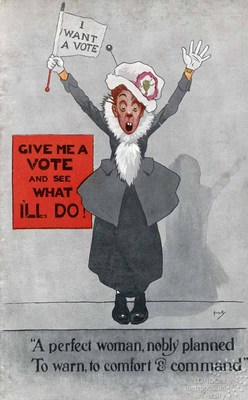
1912 women's suffrage cartoon
