= Horatio Joseph Lucas =

Horatio Joseph Lucas (1839–1873), was an English artist.

Lucas was born in London on 27 May 1839, the fourth son of Louis Lucas, a West India merchant, and belonged to an old Jewish family. Lucas was educated at Brighton and at University College London. Having considerable talents as an artist, he studied painting under F. S. Cary, and was a member of the Langham Sketching Club in London. He exhibited pictures at the Royal Academy and at the Salon in Paris. Lucas was a proficient in the art of etching, and a contributor to the various Black and White exhibitions.

In 1862 Lucas joined his father's business, so that he was only able to devote his leisure time to art. He was an accomplished musician, and an active and useful member of the Jewish community in London. He married Isabel, daughter of Count d'Avigdor, and niece of Sir Francis Goldsmid, baronet, and died on 18 December 1873, leaving four children.
