= Lance Thackeray =

British painter, illustrator, and writer (1869–1916)

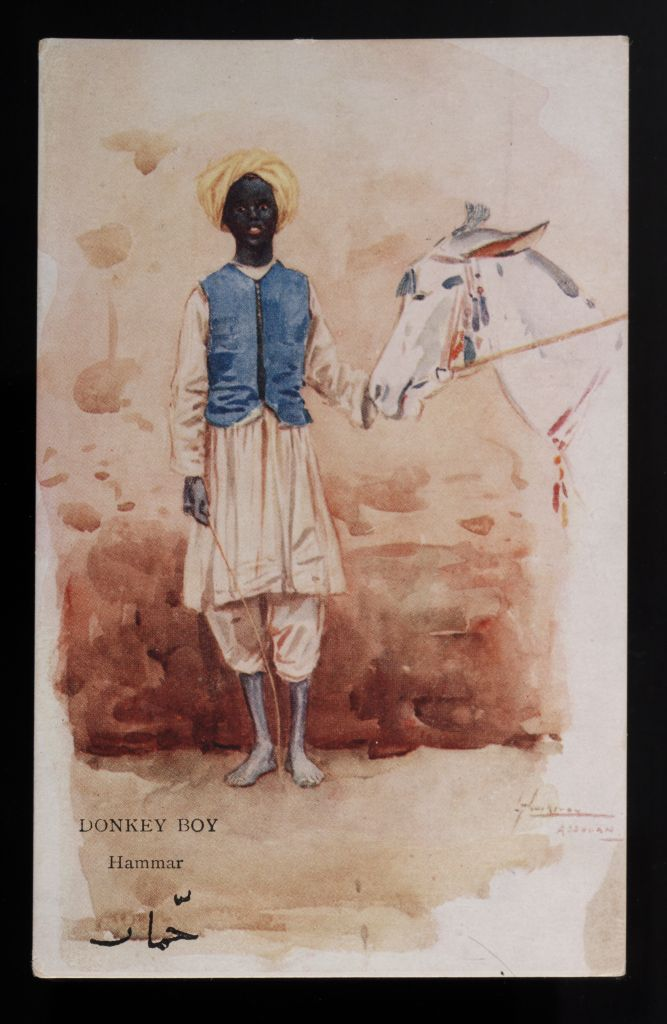
Postcard of an Egyptian donkey boy, painted in watercolour by Thackeray.

Lot "Lance" Thackeray RBA (17 January 1867 – 10 August 1916) was an English illustrator, known especially for his comic sporting illustrations involving billiards and golf and for his many humorous postcards.

Born in Darlington to Thomas Thackeray and his wife Selina Neish, Thackeray was baptized into the Church of England on 17 February 1867 at St John’s Church, Darlington. At the 1881 United Kingdom census, Thackeray, one of nine children, was aged fourteen and was still at school, while his father was recorded as a railway foreman porter. Two older sisters were a dressmaker and a milliner. His 82-year old maternal grandfather, originally from Scotland, was living with the family and was a gardener.

Thackeray was a founding member of the London Sketch Club. When he was over thirty, he spent some winters in Egypt and produced humorous sketches which he collected in The Light Side of Egypt (1908).

Thackeray drew the designs for over 950 postcards, mostly humorous, and made a great number of illustrations for the press in England. At the beginning of the First World War despite being aged over forty, he volunteered for the Artists Rifles. He died in Brighton in 1916 after a long illness.

At the time of his death on 10 August 1916, Thackeray was a Lance Corporal. He was buried in the Extra Mural Cemetery at Brighton.
