= Arnold Beauvais =

British designer

Arnold Victor Beauvais (1886–1984) was a British designer and illustrator.

He was born in Rushey Green, Catford, London in April 1886, the third of six children of French-born painter and lithographic artist Charles Henri Beauvais (1862–1911) and his wife Anne Corfield.

Beauvais created the artwork for the British poster for the 1955 Marilyn Monroe film The Seven Year Itch.

His son Tom Beauvais is also a poster designer.

His son Walter John Beauvais (1942–1998) was a painter.
