= Dudley Hardy =

English painter and illustrator (1867–1922)

- Born: 15 January 1867; Sheffield, Yorkshire, England
- Died: 11 August 1922 (aged 55); London, England
- Education: Düsseldorf Academy; Antwerp Academy
- Known for: Painting, drawing, illustration

Dudley Hardy ROI RBA (15 January 1867 – 11 August 1922) was an English painter and illustrator.

== Life and work ==
Hardy was the eldest son of the marine painter Thomas Bush Hardy, under whose influence and tutelage he first learned to draw and paint. In 1882 he attended the Düsseldorf Academy where he remained for three years. After a further two years' study in Paris and at Antwerp Academy he returned to England to live and work in London.

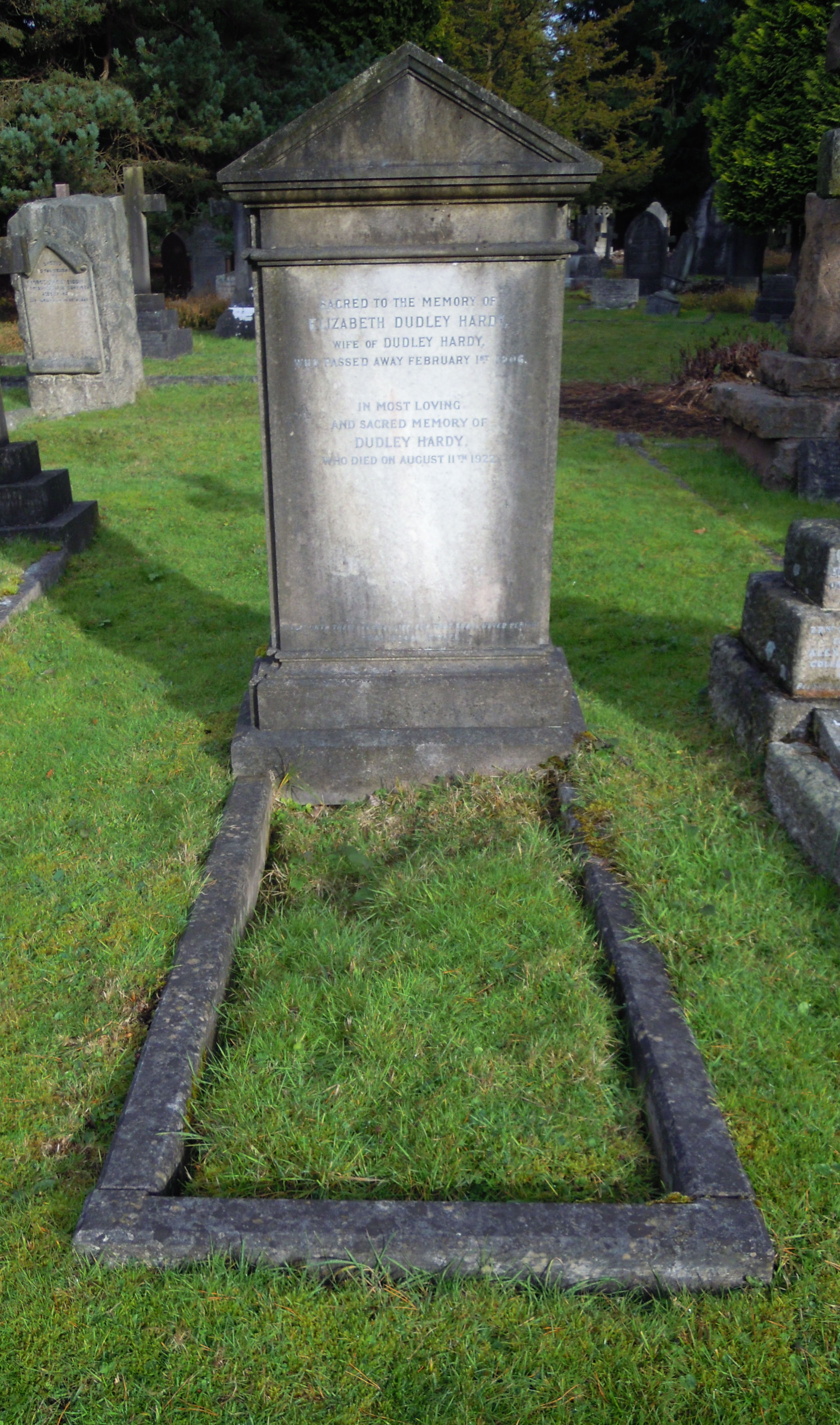
Hardy's grave in Brookwood Cemetery

In 1885 Hardy began exhibiting at the Royal Academy, an association that lasted to his death. His painting, Sans Asile (1889), a view of rough sleepers in Trafalgar Square, was exhibited at the Paris Salon, and the Royal Society of British Artists Gallery in 1893; it was this painting that established his reputation. Sans Asile and his 1889 painting Dock Strike (London Dock Strike), were part of a wider artistic and statistical examination highlighting London poverty.

The preferred subjects for his work became the Middle East and Brittany; painting scenes of desert life and Breton peasantry. Although not visiting the Sudan he became a 'War Artist' for the 1890s Sudanese War, providing illustrations for London periodicals. His interest in illustration led to the production of French graphic influenced poster imagery, most notably the Yellow Girl advertisement for Today magazine, and Gaiety Girls, a series of posters depicting actresses of the Gaiety Theatre. Further illustrations were for the D'Oyly Carte Opera Company and the Savoy Theatre. Much of Hardy's illustrative work is held at the Victoria and Albert Museum.

In the early 1900s he produced a range of comical postcards, and in 1909 a series of caricatures for the souvenir programme of the Doncaster Aviation Meeting, England's first airshow. Hardy was included by Percy Bradshaw in his The Art of the Illustrator which presented a portfolio containing a biography of Hardy, an illustration of him in his studio and an explanation of his method of working, accompanied by an illustration typical of his work and other plates showing its production. Hardy's coloured illustration shows three different views of a standing man on the north African coast.

Hardy joined his friend George Haité as a founder member of the London Sketch Club; and became the club's president. He later joined the Eccentric Club.

Dudley Hardy died of heart failure in 1922, and was buried at Brookwood Cemetery near Woking in Surrey.

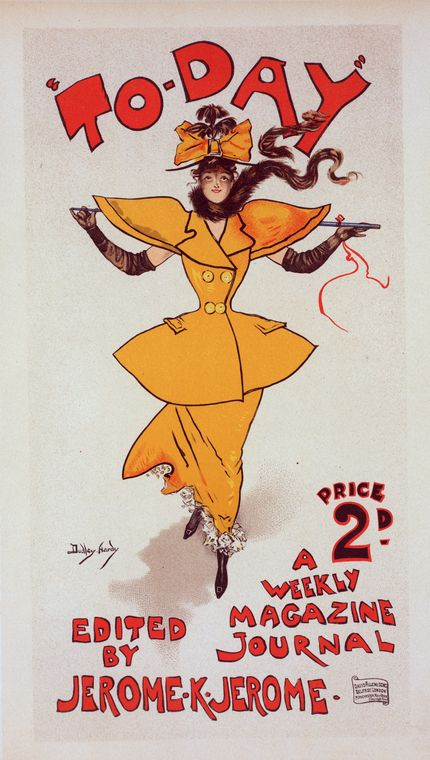
Today poster - Yellow Girl from the "Les maîtres de l'affiches" series

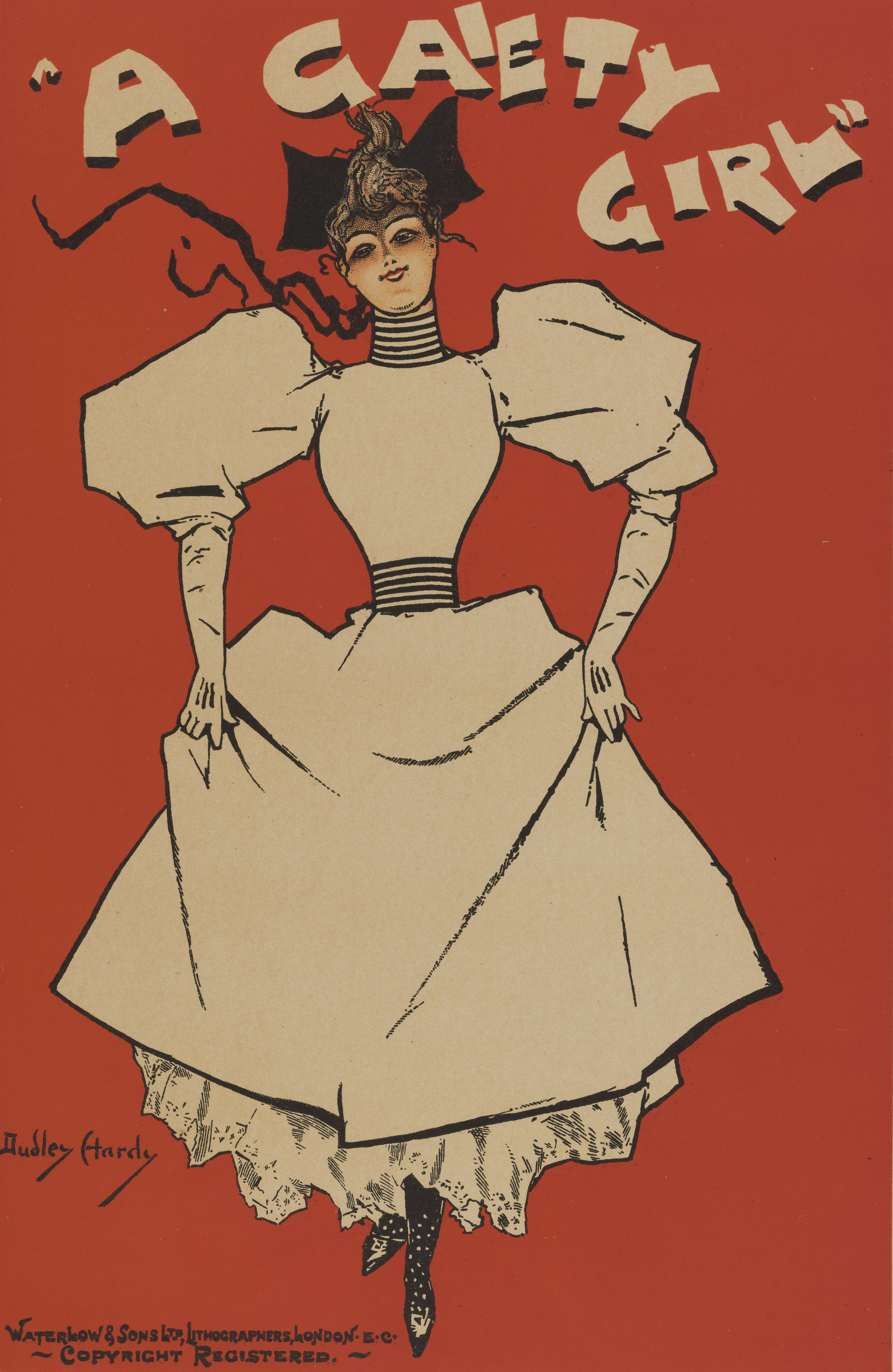
A Gaiety Girl from the Les Maitres de l'Affiche series (c 1895)
