= Auckland Weekly News =

Illustrated weekly newspaper in New Zealand

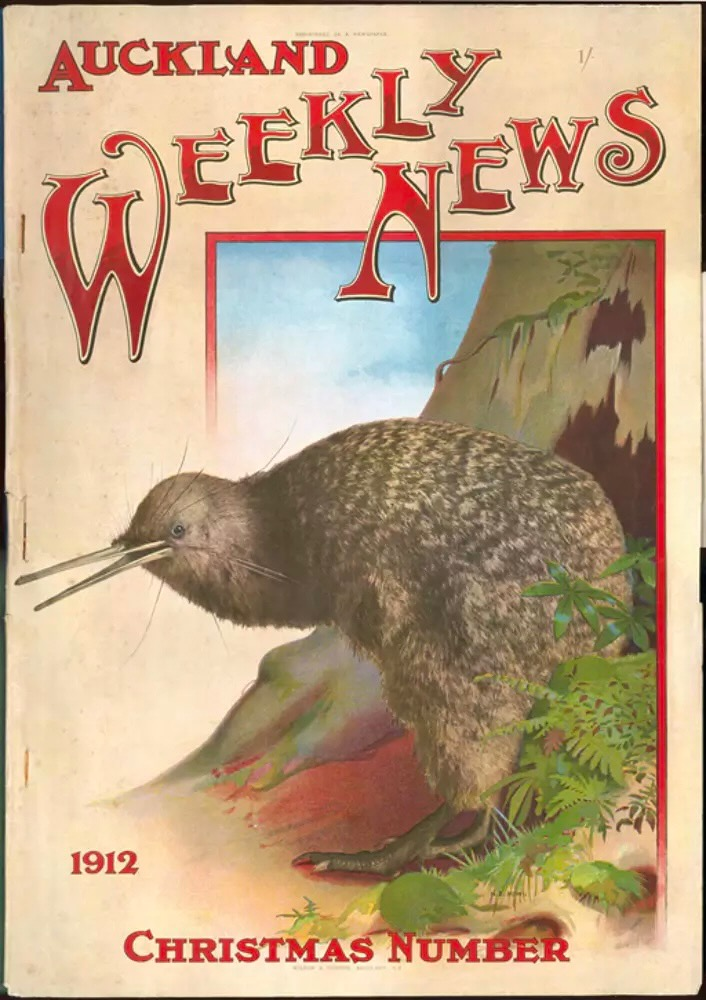
- Auckland Weekly News 1912 Christmas Number
- Type: Weekly newspaper
- Format: Tabloid
- Founded: 1861 or 1863
- Political alignment: Centre-right
- Ceased publication: 1971
- Headquarters: Auckland
- Circulation: 65,000+ in 1934
- Sister newspapers: New Zealand Herald

The Auckland Weekly News, formerly the Weekly News, was a weekly newspaper published in Auckland and posted around the country between 1861 and 1971.

Over 130,000 images from the paper, on the Auckland Libraries website, were mostly digitised about 2010.

== History ==
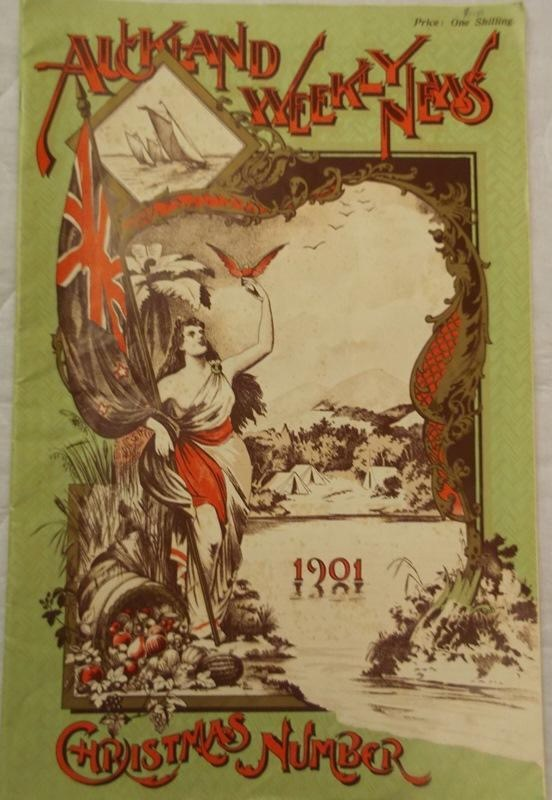
Auckland Weekly News 1901 Christmas Number

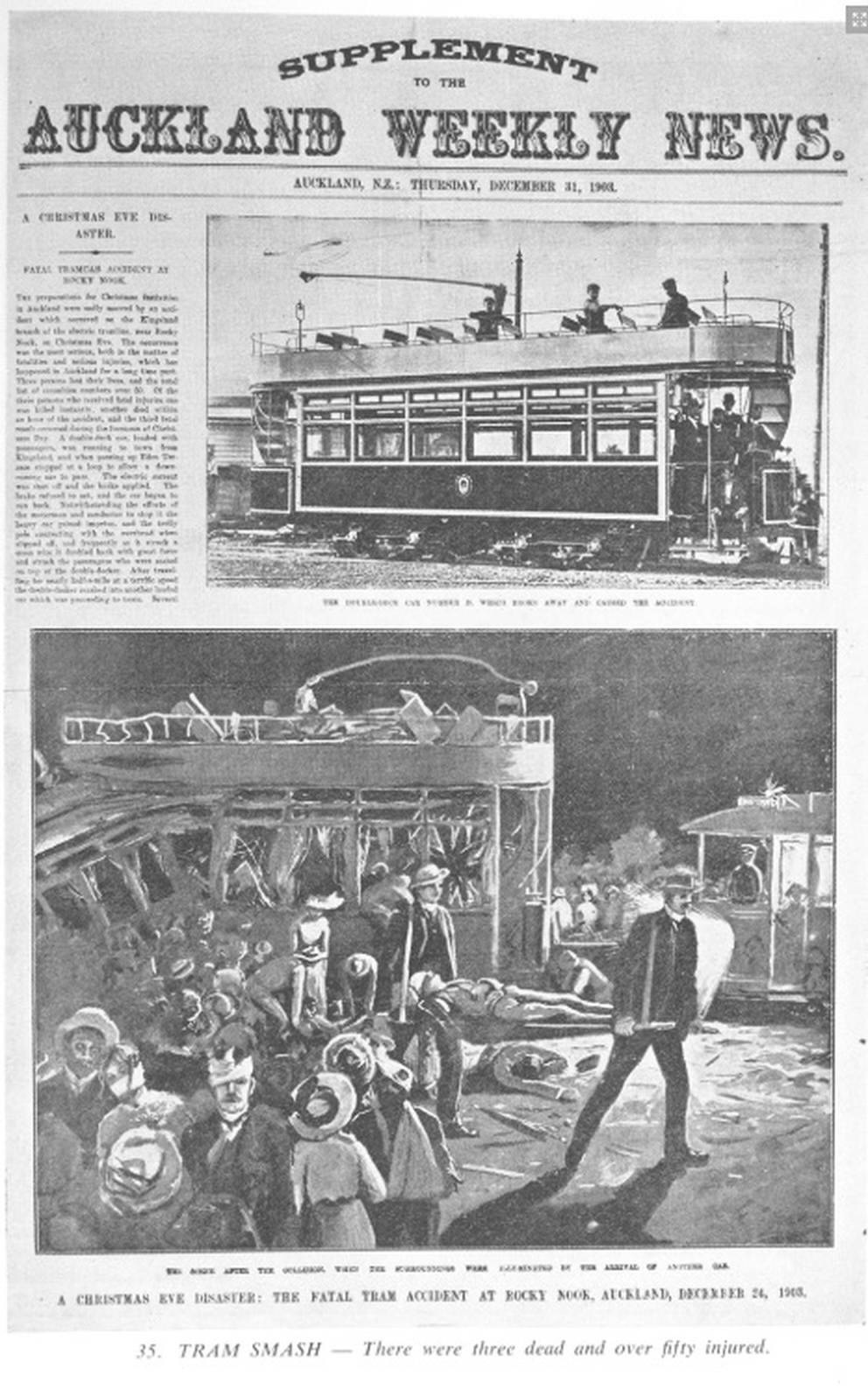
Auckland Weekly News 1903

The Weekly News was founded by the Daily Southern Cross on 25 November 1863, primarily for country readers who couldn't get the paper every day. It was followed on 7 April 1866 by the Weekly Herald, a similar paper from the publisher of the New Zealand Herald. Wilson and Horton, who published the Herald, planned the paper originally for circulation to rural areas, but it was then distributed everywhere. It seems that there was an earlier Auckland Weekly News (AWN), as the publisher asked the Auckland City Board to advertise with it in June 1863 and some sources say AWN started in 1861.

The paper had its origins with the Wilson and Horton families. In 1863, William Chisholm Wilson, an Auckland printer, withdrew from his partnership in the New Zealander to start the New Zealand Herald. In 1876, Alfred Horton, a journalist and printer, sold his interest in the Thames Advertiser and bought the Daily Southern Cross. In 1877 the sons of Horton and Wilson merged the papers, Weekly News and Weekly Herald, under the Weekly News title, with a combined circulation close to 5,000 (by 1934 circulation of the Christmas issue was over 65,000). The earliest AWN in a public collection dates from 1877. In 1878 illustrations were added to the masthead. It seems the Weekly News title was again prefixed by Auckland from 1880. By 1882 other illustrations were included. In July 1913 the illustrated section was expanded when the Weekly Graphic was merged with AWN. As well as Auckland events, AWN covered national and international news. From May 1898 AWN included a glossy centre-spread supplement with black and white photographs. It had a pink cover and by 1968 had colour photos, though the shades of pink varied. To reflect their coverage in 1934 they changed their name back to Weekly News and to New Zealand Weekly News in 1965. The format changed when colour printing started. AWN closed in 1971.

== Contributors ==
- William Beattie 1894-1920
- George Bourne 1909?-1924
- Harold Brainsby 1938-1952
- Leslie Hinge 1919-1940
- Thelma Kent -1946
- Trevor Lloyd 1905-1936
- Katrine Mackay 1902-1908
- William McCullough 1861-1864
- Gordon Minhinnick 1930-1971
- Harry Rountree 1899-1901
- Mona Tracy 1904-1912
- Keith Waite -1949
- Dorothy Wall 1937-1941
- Jessie Weston
- Ruth Wilkinson 1920s-30s
- Henry Winkelmann 1893-1928
