= Bert Thomas (disambiguation) =

Bert Thomas was a cartoonist.

Bert Thomas may also refer to:

- Bert Thomas (Kon'nichiwa Anne: Before Green Gables), fictional character
- Bert Thomas, performer at Theatre of NOTE

== See also ==
- Herbert Thomas (disambiguation)
- Albert Thomas (disambiguation)
- Robert Thomas (disambiguation)
- Hubert Thomas (disambiguation)
- Bertram Thomas, explorer
- B. W. R. Thomas, Sri Lankan cricketer
