= Percy Bradshaw =

British illustrator and teacher of illustration

Percy Venner Bradshaw
- Born: 27 November 1877; London, England
- Died: 13 October 1965 (aged 87); London, England
- Occupations: Illustrator; cartoonist; teacher of illustration
- Years active: 1892–1958
- Notable work: The Art of the Illustrator

Percy Venner Bradshaw (27 November 1877 – 13 October 1965), who often signed PVB, was a British illustrator who also created the Press Art School, a correspondence course for drawing.

== Biography ==
Percy Bradshaw was born in Hackney, part of London, on 27 November 1877, the son of William Bradshaw, a warehouseman, and his wife Frances Ann. He was baptised in Dover on 27 January 1878. He attended Newport Road School in Leyton where he reached fourth class. He then attended Ivydale Road School from 12 March 1888 to 30 March 1889, moving to Haberdashers' Aske' Boys School (Note: Confusingly, there were two Schools with the same name and the same origin. Haberdashers' Aske's Boys' School at Elstree, which is a public school, generally known as Haberdashers and Haberdashers' Aske' Boys School at Hatcham, generally knowns as Aske's which became first a grammar school and then a comprehensive school. It is now an Academy) at Hatcham. He dropped out of Aske's when he was 14 years old and started working at an advertising agency. Meanwhile, he followed evening courses in art at Goldsmiths College and Birkbeck College.

Bradshaw had his first drawing published in The Boy's Own Paper when he was 15 years old, and moved to the art department of the advertising agency. Three years later he became a full-time cartoonist, with his work also appearing in magazines like Bystander (magazine), Home Chat, Sunday Companion, Tatler, The Sketch and The Windsor Magazine. He also worked for a while for the Daily Mail. Bradshaw so closely resembled the Prime Minister, Asquith, that people would doff their hats to him when he went for walks in the park.

Bradshaw married Mabel Alice Bennett (6 January 1881 – 17 February 1966), the daughter of the late Edmund Hellyer Bennett (1841–1883) and Mary Anne Gardner (1841–1904), at St Peter's Church in Brockley, Lewisham on 27 July 1910. The wedding was choral, and 160 guests attended the reception at St. Peter's Hall. Among the wedding gifts was a grand piano (from the bride's sister). The couple left for a honeymoon in Switzerland. By 1911 the census shows the newly-weds living at 37 Dacres Road, Forest Hill, London, where they were to remain their entire lives. (Note: Dacres Road was partially renumbered between the 1958 and 1959 electoral registers, so that their address of 37 Dacres Road became 97 Dacres Road.)

The couple had one child, Denise M.

== The Press Art School ==
He also wrote articles on drawing, appearing in the Daily Graphic and in The Boy's Own Paper, where his series Black and White Drawing as a Profession was so successful that he decided to create his own art correspondence course, the Press Art School, in 1905. (Note: The Daily News of Saturday, 25 February 1905 contained a small advertisement announcing that The Press Art School gives thorough course of instruction, by correspondence, in all branches of magazine and newspaper illustration.) (Note: His first pupil was Leo Cheney, (1878–1928), a bank clerk from Accrington, Lancashire who became a successful sports, joke, and political cartoonist, caricaturist, and illustrator. Cheney later joined the staff of the Press Art School. He is probably best known for the iconic Johnny Walker illustration.) He remained principal of the school for more than 50 years, first from his home, later from Tudor Hall in Forest Hill, London.

The school was quite well regarded. (Note: Pearson's Weekly described the Press Art School as one of the best art schools giving instructions by correspondence, and notes that several of that papers' own staff artists have trained at the school.) Not the least of the advantages that Bradshaw's school offered was that Bradshaw not only offered training, but also introduced the work of his pupils to those editors he considered most likely to use of the sketches. (Note: Pearson's Weekly considered that these introductions alone were worth the small cost of the courses.) Thus Bradshaw helped Leo Cheyney to sell drawings to The Boys' Own Paper, Bystander and other publications.

Bradshaw though that the outbreak of the First World War doomed his school, but clever advertising turned the War to his advantage, swelling the ranks of his students. He enrolled over 1,100 new pupils by the end of 1914, over 1,500 in 1915, and averaged over 3,000 enrollments a year for the 1916–1918. By 1918 he had 22 full-time assistants and the GPO needed a special van to deliver his mail. Bradshaw once remarked that The only difficulty I had was keeping going between wars.

== Later life ==
During the First World War, Bradshaw was a special constable; during the second, he worked as a firewatcher. After the first war, he created hundreds of illustrated postcards for specialized companies like Raphael Tuck & Sons, worked again for an advertising agency, and for Sun Engravings from Watford. During the Second World War, he wrote articles about cartoonists for the London Opinion, and published humorous poetry.

Bradshaw was a member of the London Sketch Club and in 1958 wrote the history of the Savage Club where he was a committee member. He died in on 13 October 1965 at Hither Green Hospital, Lewisham in London. His estate was valued at £25,000. Mabel Alice survived him by less than six months, dying at Levisham Hospital, London on 17 February 1966. Her estate was valued at £26,543.

== The Art of the Illustrator ==
The Art of the Illustrator was probably Bradshaw's most important work. It consisted of a series of portfolios based on twenty leading illustrators. Bradshaw commissioned each of them for a special illustration. Each artist was free to choose the subject, so long as the illustration was representative of the artist's normal technique and that five preliminary stages in its composition should be shown. It is not absolutely clear when the portfolios were published. The Jisc catalogue (Note: The Jisc Library Hub Discover brings together the catalogues of 165 Major UK and Irish libraries. Additional libraries are being added all the time, and the catalogue collates national, university, and research libraries.) shows them being issued from 1900 to 1920. However, notices from the press show them as just issued in June 1917.. The Graphic noted that twelve of the portfolios had already been published by mid-June 1917. Therefore, the dates should probably be 1917–1918. Some of the illustrations are dated 1915 and one may even be dated 1914. This makes sense as some illustrators were bound to take longer to complete their commissions and it took Bradshaw, who was dealing with a huge surge in enrolments, time to write the descriptions.

The portfolios were not cheap, for what they were: a set of six plates and less than thirty pages of text. A review in The Connoisseur: An Illustrated Magazine for Collectors in August 1918 gives the cost of the set of twenty portfolios as £7. 7s. (seven guineas) or £8. 8s. (eight guineas) if purchased in monthly instalments. A single portfolio on its own cost 10s 6d. (half a guinea).

Each of the twenty portfolios dealt with the personality and working methods of a leading illustrator with:

1. a biography of the illustrator
2. an illustration or photograph of the illustrator at work in their studio
3. an explanation by the illustrator describing what they have done in each stage of the preparation of the illustration
4. a plate showing an illustration typical of their work
5. five other plates showing the work at five earlier stages of its production, from the first pencil rough to the just before the finished drawing or colour sketch.

Six of the illustrators worked in watercolour, five in pen and ink, two in wash-painting, and one in body-colour. The subjects of the portfolios, and they were:

- Henry Mayo Bateman (1887–1970) (Note: The coloured illustration shows a caricatured man in top hat and tails in front of a chorous line of dancing women. The preparatory drawing shows how Bateman begins with the head of his subject and works from there.)
- Charles Edmund Brock (1870–1938) (Note: The pen and ink illustration shows a disgruntled older gentleman escorting a young lady past admiring young men)
- Cyrus Cuneo (1879–1916) (Note: The black and white illustration shows a horseman dismounting at a campsite while a man and a woman are cooking,)
- William Russell Flint (1880–1969) (Note: The coloured illustration shows one naked and one half-naked young woman picking front on a sea shore.)
- Dudley Hardy (1867–1922) (Note: The coloured illustration shows three different views of a standing man on the north African coast. However the five preliminary drawing show an entirely different interior view with one standing and one seated men.)
- William Hatherell (1855–1928) (Note: The black and white illustration shows a wounded soldier and a friend playing draughts while a nurse looks on.)
- Fortunino Matania (1881–1963) (Note: This black and white illustration shows a German cavalryman in combat with an infantryman at a street barricade.)
- J. Bernard Partridge (1861–1945) (Note: The pen and ink drawing shows what appears to be a German cavalry man with a ragged, blindfolded woman riding pillion on a mountain road. It was reproduced by permission of Punch and was probably a political reference to the First World War. The extraneous sketches in the preparatory work suggest that this was from his sketch-book, rather than being specially prepared.)
- Gerald Spencer Pryse (1882–1956) (Note: This sepia-wash illustration shows two standing, almost-naked, young women.)
- Warwick Reynolds {1880–1926) (Note: The black and white illustration shows an African couple with a baby in European dress.)
- Frank Reynolds (artist) (1876–1953) (Note: The illustration shows a disgruntled traveller accompanied by his wife and child)
- W. Heath Robinson (1872–1944) (Note: The coloured illustration shows a fantasy feast with naked cherubs)
- Harry Rountree (1878–1950)Harry Rountree: Harry Rountree and His Work: The Art of the Illustrator (Limited Edition Prints) (Note: The coloured illustration apparently shows a young chick being threatened by a mouse against a river background. It is dated 1915.)
- Claude Allin Shepperson (1867–1921) (Note: The pen and ink illustration shows two women with a girl and a bed under a tree in a park. The way in which Shepperson builds up his illustration from sketches of different elements is clearly shown.)
- E. J. Sullivan (1869–1933) (Note: The pen and ink illustration shows an artist in the clutter of his studio glumly looking on as a naked model admires herself in a hand mirror.)
- Balliol Salmon (1868–1953) (Note: The black and white illustration shows an army officer being inspected by his son and daughters, presumably as he bids his family farewell.)
- Bert Thomas (1883–1966) (Note: This black and white illustration shows one soldier giving a cigarette to another.)
- Frederick Henry Townsend (1868–1920) (Note: The black and white illustration shows a wounded soldier and a friend playing draughts while a nurse looks on.)
- Louise Wright (illustrator) (active: London 1910) (Note: The black and white illustration shows two fashion models as the detail of the clothing is built up.)
- Lawson Wood (1878–1957) (Note: The coloured illustration shows a young boy and girl seated among a patch of flowers. It is dated 1914 or possibly 1916.)

== Other books by Bradshaw ==
As with The Art of the Illustrator most of Bradshaw's other writing was either didactic, helping art students to learn new techniques and so on, or biographic, such as his Nice People to Know or the history of the Savage Club.

Books and similar publications by Bradshaw
No.	Year	Title	Other authors/Illustrators	Publisher	Pages	Notes
1	1913	Art training by nature's methods: preparatory course of instruction		Press Art School, London	24 p., ill., 29 cm	(Note: The introductory course for the Press Art School)
2	1919	Advanced Course of Instruction		Press Art School, London		(Note: Advanced instruction by post in magazine, book and newspaper illustration. In the introduction, Bradshaw said: the career of the average professional painter is nowadays almost a hopeless one for the man who has no private means.)
3	1925	Art in advertising: a study of British and American pictorial publicity		Press Art School, London	xvi, 496 p., ill. (part col.), 32 x 25 cm.	(Note: The Bystander described it as a handsomely produced volume which ranges over the whole field of advertising, from the angle of art, in a most interesting way and deals in turn with the great advertising agencies and the work of individual artists being profusedly illustrated with example from the brushes of the leading advertising artists of the day . . . Bradshaw promoted the book by speaking on the topic through the country.)
4	1929	Water Colour Painting		Press Art School, London	6 parts, (4º)	(Note: In six parts by different water-colourists with prefaces by Bradshaw.)
5	1936	Fashion Drawing & Designing. [By various authors.]	Julia Cairns, Grace Cox Ife, Florence E. Ricketts	Press Art School, London	6 parts, (4º)	(Note: In six parts. Presumably, this follows the usual pattern of fashion artists presenting their work with prefaces by Bradshaw.)
6	1941	I wish I could draw: a system of art teaching by natural methods		The Studio, London	96 p : ill. (part mounted) diagrs, 26 cm.	(Note: Demonstration lessons in drawing. No. 31 in the How to Do It series by The Studio.)
7	1942	They make us smile		Chapman & Hall ltd, London	112 p : ill, 19 cm.	(Note: Pen-pictures of humorous artists. With illustrations.)
8	1943	Marching On	Bert Thomas	W. H. Allen & Co, London	127 p., (8º)	(Note: Poetry by Bradshaw with illustrations by Punch cartoonist Bert Thomas.)
9	1943	Drawn from memory: adventures in the arts		Chapman & Hall, London	vii, 255, 1 p., 24 pl., ill., 22 cm.	(Note: Bradshaw's autobiography.)
10	1944	Nice People to know.		Chapman & Hall, London	xi, 201 p., (8º)	(Note: Illustrated with photographs. Twenty light pen-portraits with and appreciations of a mixed bag of celebrities including; Field-Marshal Bernard Montgomery, A. P. Herbert, Benno Moiseiwitsch, Mark Hambourg, Noël Coward, Lord Woolton, Dame Lilian Braithwaite, Tommy Handley, Sir Frank Brangwyn, Dame Laura Knight, Sir Norman Birkett, and Norman Allin.)
11	1945	I Wish I Could Paint	Ernest W. Haslehust	The Studio, London	96 p., (4º)	(Note: Demonstration lessons in Water-Colour. No. 36 in the How to Do It series by The Studio.)
12	1946	Line of Laughter		W. H. Allen & Co, London	140 p., (8º)	(Note: Features 100 cartoons and drawings by 21 humorous artists reprinted from London Opinion, mostly drawn during the Second World War.)
13	1946	Seen in perspective, 1895–1945: a panorama of fifty years		Chapman & Hall ltd, London	219 p., ill., 23 cm.	(Note: A review of the last fifty years. The Aberdeen Press and Journal described it as: both readable and informative. It is, in fact, for many us valuable record of the major events, the fashions and the changes that have shaped our lives.)
14	1949	The magic of line: a study of drawing through the ages		Studio Publications, London	112 p., ill., 26 cm.	(Note: The Western Morning News stated that the book proved to be as exciting as its title suggests and that the well illustrated text took the reader on journey through the ages—from the cave drawings of Altamira to the work of Degas.)
15	1949	Come Sketching	Sir Frank Brangwyn, Sir W. Russell Flint, Sydney R. Jones, (Note: Sydney Robert Jones (27 February 1881 – 7 September 1966.) Studied art at the Birmingham School of Art. Most famous for his illustrated travel books, and especially for his surveys of old manor houses. cottages etc.) Francis Marshall, (Note: William Francis Marshall (1909-1980) studied at the Slade School and became an illustrator in black and white and watercolour. He started his career in advertising illustration, and began to illustrated for Vogue in 1928. He painted covers for a wide range of romantic fiction, including novels by Barbara Cartland. He wrote numerous books on illustration including: Magazine Illustration, Fashion Drawing, Sketching the Ballet and Drawing the Female Figure.) Bertram Nichols, (Note: Bertram Nicholls (26 September 1883 – 23 December 1974) was an English landscape painter and teacher who trained not only with individual painters but also at the Slade School, Madrid, Italy, and France. He was a prolific exhibitor, exhibiting at the Fine Art Society 264 times,) Fred Taylor, (Note: Fred Taylor (22 March 1875 – 1963), watercolourist and poster artist. Studied at the Academie Julian in Paris, in Goldsmiths College School (where he got a gold medal for posters), and in Italy. Probably did his best work on posters, of which he produced hundreds, many showing tourist attractions, for the railways and several steamship companies.) Charles Tunnicliffe, and Norman Wilkinson	Studio Publications, London	96 p., (4º)	(Note: Edited by Bradshaw. The other artists contributed advice as well as examples from their own sketch books.)
16	1952	Water-colour: a truly English art		Studio Publications, London	127 p., ill., 30 cm.	(Note: Discusses both techniques and the artist's lives. Many Artists represented including John Sell Cotman, Peter De Wint, John Constable, David Cox, J. M. W. Turner, W. Russell Flint, Lamorna Birch, Frank Brangwyn, Laura Knight and Alfred Munnings.)
17	1956	Sketching & Painting indoors. [With illustrations.]	Rowland Hilder	Studio Publications, London	96 p., (8º)	(Note: No. 67 in the How to Do It series by The Studio.)
18	1958	Brother savages and guests': a history of the Savage Club 1857-1957		W.H. Allen, London	xiii, 162 p., 10 pl., 26 cm.	(Note: The book got somewhat mixed reviews. The Sketch noted that the book . . . naturally proves to be full of good stories. However, The Stage complaining that for the price (1£ 10s.) and occasion one would have expected a book more attractive both in content and format, and that Bradshaw's prose was somewhat flat and pedestrian even if he had succeeded in gathering a large mass of interesting and entertaining facts.)

== Faculty ==
Faculty (consulting staff) of the Press Art School included

- Fred Pegram
- W. Heath Robinson
- Harry Rountree
- Bert Thomas

== Alumni ==
Students of the Press Art School included

- Barry Ernest Appleby (1909–96) (Note: Born in Birmingham and won a prize from the Royal Drawing Society at the age of nine. Most famous as the illustrator of the Gambols cartoon strip on which he collaborated with his wife Doris.)
- Honor C. Appleton
- Mary Baker
- Albert Edgar Beard
- Molly Brett
- Luis Chan (1904–1995)
- Leo Cheney
- Alan D'Egville
- Phiny Dick
- Fougasse Pseudonym for Cyril Kenneth Bird (1887–1965)
- D. L. Ghilchik
- Charles Grave
- Joseph Booth Lee (1901–1974) (Note: Born in Burley-in-Wharfedale, Yorkshire, and won a scholarship to Leeds Grammar School. Studied Cartooning with the Press Art School. He won a scholarship at the Royal College of Art, but when he moved to London to take it up found that he could not pay his way and began working freelance.)
- Kin Maung
- Norman Pett
- Bertram Prance
- William Ridgewell
- Ralph Steadman
