= Mona Tracy =

New Zealand writer, journalist and community worker (1892–1959)

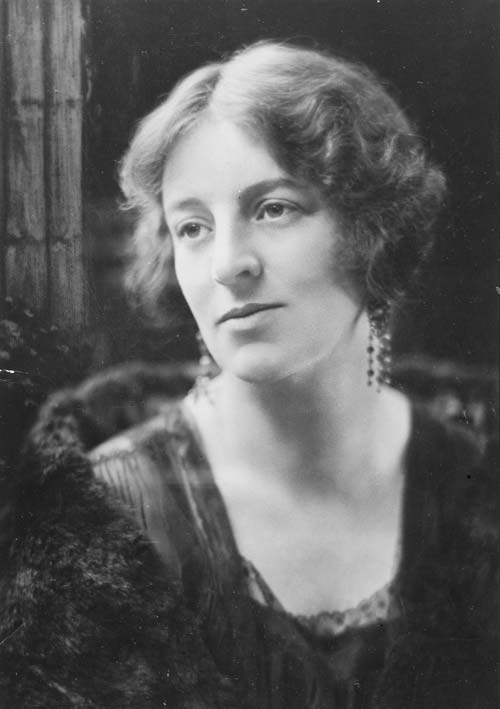
- Tracy, c. 1923
- Born: Mona Innis Mackay; 24 January 1892; Adelaide, South Australia
- Died: 22 February 1959 (aged 67); Christchurch, New Zealand
- Resting place: Ruru Lawn Cemetery, Bromley, New Zealand
- Occupations: Novelist; journalist; poet; short-story writer; community worker
- Spouse: William Francis Tracy (m. 1921)
- Children: 2
- Relatives: Katrine Mackay (mother)
- Writing career
- Period: 1925–1930
- Genre: Children's adventure stories

Mona Innis Tracy (née Mackay; 24 January 1892 – 22 February 1959) was a New Zealand children's novelist, journalist, poet, short-story writer, and community worker. She was best-known for her three children's novels, published between 1927 and 1930, which were adventures set in historical New Zealand.

== Early life ==
Tracy was born in Kensington, Adelaide in 1892, to Catherine Julia Bilston, an Australian-born writer and journalist (later known by her penname Katrine), and her husband John Williams Mackay, a New Zealand farmer and auctioneer. Shortly after Tracy's birth the family moved to Whangārei, New Zealand, where her younger brother Cyril (known as Ian) was born, and from there to Auckland and later Paeroa where she attended Paeroa School.

Tracy and her brother learned to speak Māori fluently during childhood. She also excelled at the piano and as a teenager was offered a contract by J. C. Williamson's to tour theatres in Australia and New Zealand, but declined the offer. After her father deserted the family around 1902, her mother supported the family by working as a journalist for the Auckland Weekly News.

== Career ==
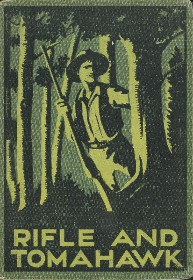
The first edition of Rifle and Tomahawk (1927), illustrated by G. H. Evison

Tracy left school at the age of 14 and began working as a sub-editor for the Auckland Weekly News. In 1912, she and a cousin lived in Sydney for a year, where she worked as a reporter at a local paper. After her return to New Zealand, in 1917, she began working as a general reporter for The Press in Christchurch, as one of the first female general reporters in the country, and was one of the first female journalists to sit in the press gallery at criminal trials. On 29 March 1921 she married a young barrister, William Tracy, at St Mary's Church, and they had two children.

Over the next ten years, Tracy raised her children and wrote poetry, short stories and three bestselling children's novels (all published by Whitcombe & Tombs). Piriki's Princess (1925), a collection of stories that had been published in The Sun, was praised by The Evening Post as having a "truly New Zealand background and atmosphere", and for including stories dealing with Māori legend and viewpoints. Her first children's novel, Rifle and Tomahawk (1927), was set at the time of Te Kooti's War, and featured both Pākehā and Māori teenage protagonists. The Auckland Star praised the novel "not only for its merits, but for its connection with the story of our own country", noting that it represented one of the first stories of adventure for young readers set in New Zealand; "young readers will discover thrilling episodes and incentive to heroism and much entertainment". Her subsequent novels Lawless Days (1928) and Martin Thorn: Adventurer (1930) were similarly praised for their adventurous nature and appeal to young readers.

She continued to write articles for various publications including the Auckland Sun and the Australian magazine Aussie, in which she contributed to a column called "The Voice of the Enzed Woman" and discussed women's political issues. She also wrote for the Whitcombe's Story Books series and wrote several school history textbooks. Two of her poems were published in the anthology Kowhai Gold in 1930. In the 1930s she presented a series of radio broadcasts about life on the West Coast of New Zealand; these were later collected in the book West Coast Yesterdays, published by A. H. and A. W. Reed in 1960 shortly after her death.

In 1937, Tracy earned the King George VI Coronation Medal for her services to the community. She had served as secretary of a Christchurch refugee committee in the 1930s, and established a soup kitchen near her home in New Brighton for those affected by the Great Depression. In 1942, having given her age as seven years younger than she actually was, she enlisted in the New Zealand Women's Auxiliary Air Force, and attained the rank of corporal. Her husband worked as an officer for the Home Guard at Lyttelton Harbour.

After the war, Tracy and her family moved to the small town of Governors Bay, where she served as the president of the local branch of the Women's Division of the Federated Farmers of New Zealand in 1949–50. She died in Christchurch in February 1959, and her brother gave a Māori oration over her grave.

== Selected works ==
=== Short-stories ===
- Piriki's Princess (1925)

=== Novels ===
- Rifle and Tomahawk (1927)
- Lawless Days (1928)
- Martin Thorn: Adventurer (1930)

=== Non-fiction ===
- The Story of the Pacific (1925)
- Historic Kawau (1927)
- West Coast Yesterdays (1960)
