= Harry Rountree =

- Born: 26 January 1878; Auckland, New Zealand
- Died: 26 September 1950 (aged 72); St Ives, Cornwall, England
- Occupation: Illustrator
- Spouse: Stella Stewart (m. 1906–1950)
- Children: 2

Harry Rountree (26 January 1878 – 26 September 1950) was a New Zealand-British illustrator and painter. He worked in England around the turn of the 20th century. Born in Auckland, New Zealand, he moved to London in 1901, when he was 23 years old.

== Life ==
Harry Rountree was born in 1878 to Irish banker, Stephen Gilbert Rountree and Julia Bartley, the niece of New Zealand architect Edward Bartley.

Rountree was educated at Auckland's Queen's College, and began working at Wilson and Horton Printers in the city, designing show-cards, advertisements, and product labels. He progressed to become special artist for the Auckland Weekly News, published by Wilson and Horton, with his earliest signed drawings, quite serious in tone and subject matter, appearing in 1899. New Zealand formed part of the readership of the London periodical press at this time and Rountree developed the ambition to join the ranks of its most prominent illustrators. As he later stated in an interview with A B Cooper for The Boy's Own Paper:

Yes. Auckland is my native city and New Zealand is my nation... though it may be glorious for sheep, for the simple life, for lots of fun, yet it is no place for the black-and-white artist who wants to sell his wares. It seems scarcely credible, and yet, though I had done hundreds of drawings before I made the voyage of twelve thousand miles to London, I had never seen an original — except my own — and I was simply dying to see the little bits of Bristol-board containing the work of the men I most admired in the English illustrated magazines and papers'.

The first stage to realizing his ambition came with his departure from his employer at the beginning of March 1901:

A pleasing ceremony took place at the Herald office on the 1st of March, when the artistic staff of the Weekly News, and friends from other departments, gathered to bid farewell to Mr. H Rountree, Weekly News special artist, who shortly leaves for London. Mr. Palmer, head of the artistic department, made the presentation, which took the form of a high-class camera, with silverplate, suitably inscribed.

He travelled to England on the Orient Line steamship RMS Omrah, taking with him a portfolio of his work to impress British art editors. Going via the Suez Canal, he left Sydney on 10 April 1901 with members of the New Zealand bowling team. His sketches of one of their number, J V Dingle, completed on arrival in London, were sent home for publication by his former employer.

Rather than travel by ship the whole way, Rountree added a Continental flavour to the close of his journey, as was described for the New Zealand Herald by "Our own correspondent. London, June 8":

Mr. Rountree, who has been on the artistic staff of the Auckland Weekly News for some years, arrived in London last Saturday evening, by way of Paris, having come by the SS Omrah to Marseilles, and crossed France by rail. Mr. Rountree tells me that the principal object of his visit to the Mother Country is to extend his artistic studies in black and white work. His present intention is to remain in England for about two years.

At that time the market for magazine illustration was flourishing:

The advent of the halftone block in the late nineteenth century had spawned a great number of successful, long-lived illustrated periodicals such as The Strand (1891) and The Sketch (1893), as well as a number of short-lived ones such as The King. This innovation carried along in its wake a host of capable artists who were as comfortable in wash as in line drawing.

Although Rountree contributed many illustrations to The King magazine in mid-late 1901, he struggled to make very much progress towards his objective. His first encounters with art editors provided him with few commissions and little encouragement, so he enrolled in the life drawing class under Percival Gaskell at the Regent Street Polytechnic's School of Art for the academic year 1901-02. He was awarded a second-class pass in July 1902, but by that time had already met Sam Hield Hamer, editor of Little Folks magazine, who invited him to illustrate his story 'Extracts from the Diary of a Duckling'. By this fortunate meeting, Rountree discovered his forte in animal illustration, which he developed by frequent sketching visits to London Zoo.

It was after this commission that Rountree's career began to flourish and he became in demand as an illustrator. Rountree is noted for his illustrations of British golf courses and golfing caricatures. His work features in publications such as The Strand Magazine, Cassell's Magazine, Pearson's, The Sketch, The Illustrated London News, Playtime, Little Folks, and many others.

Rountree was one of the leading illustrators selected by Percy Bradshaw for inclusion in his The Art of the Illustrator (1917-1918) which presented a separate portfolio for each of twenty illustrators. (Note: The portfolio contained: a brief biography of Rountree, an illustration of Rountree at work in his studio, an explanation of Rountree's method of working. This was accompanied by a plate showing an illustration typical of his work and five other plates showing the work at five earlier stages of its production, from the first rough to the just before the finished drawing or colour sketch. Rountree's coloured illustration apparently shows a young chick being threatened by a mouse against a river background. It is dated 1915.) Rountree also served as a consultant at the Percy Bradshaw's Press Art School, a school teaching painting, drawing, and illustration by correspondence. The consultants gave feedback on the work submitted by the students.

During the First World War, he served as a captain in the Royal Engineers.

Rountree produced well-liked cartoons for the magazine Punch from 1905 to 1939, and also created advertising, posters and book illustrations for writers such as P. G. Wodehouse and Arthur Conan Doyle.

== Death ==
Harry Rountree died of cancer in the West Cornwall Hospital, Penzance, Cornwall on 26 September 1950, aged 72 years, being survived by his wife and two children. Fellow artist Bernard Ninnes wrote an appreciation of his work to accompany his obituary in the St Ives Times:

As an artist he stood alone in his own sphere as the supreme delineator of bird and animal life. His drawings and paintings in this specialised field bore the authentic stamp of deepest study and intimate familiarity of these subjects; the expression of anatomical diversity, with the constructional variety of fur and feather revealed the sum of a lifetime's keenest observation...To his animals and birds he often gave a whimsical or semi-human twist which has made them loved by generations of children... When first I knew him some twenty years ago at the London Sketch Club and The Savage his charming personality, the wit of his drawings and rare ability as a raconteur made him outstanding in a group which included such names as John Hassall, W Heath Robinson and Lawson Wood. He was one of the grand company of illustrators of the Edwardian and first Georgian period [George V 1910-1936], a time when illustration had reached a pinnacle of excellence, and Harry Rountree was in the van.

The probate valuation of his estate was £4581 1s 7d.

A commemorative bronze plaque by the sculptor W. C. H. King was erected on Smeaton's Pier, St Ives for his contribution to the artistic and civic life of the town.

== Selected works ==
=== Periodicals ===
By title, including annuals, containing Harry Rountree's illustrations within the years (not necessarily all) indicated. A representative sample from a total in excess of 100. Source:

- Auckland Weekly News, Wilson and Horton, 1899-1936
- Blackie's Children's Annual, Blackie and Son, 1913-1935
- Blighty, W. Speaight & Sons, 1916-1917; 1939-1943
- The Boy's Own Paper, Religious Tract Society, 1902-1944
- Bystander, H. R. Baines & Co., 1903-1930
- The Captain, George Newnes, 1901-1923
- Cassell's Children's Annual, Cassell, 1916-1933
- Fry's Magazine, George Newnes, 1905-1914
- Golf Illustrated, Golf Illustrated, 1909-1932
- The Humorist, George Newnes, 1922-1929
- Illustrated Sporting & Dramatic News, Illustrated Newspapers, 1911-1932
- I Pass This On To You, Women's Gas Council, 1940-1951
- Joy Street, Basil Blackwell, 1924-1936
- The King, George Newnes, 1901-1902
- Little Folks, Cassell, 1902-1933
- London Opinion, George Newnes, 1909-1931
- The Merry-Go-Round, Basil Blackwell, 1923-1939
- Little Dots|Our Little Dots/Little Dots, RTS, 1928-1936
- The Passing Show, Odhams, 1915-1934
- Pearson's Magazine, Pearson, 1905-1935
- Playtime, Amalgamated Press, 1919-1920
- The Prize, Wells Gardner, Darton and Co., 1910-1933
- Punch, or the London Charivari, Punch Office, 1906-1939
- The Quiver, Cassell, 1903-1932
- Radio Times, BBC, 1929-1944
- The Red Magazine, Amalgamated Press, 1910-1920
- The Royal Magazine, Pearson, 1904-1922
- The Sketch, Illustrated London News & Sketch, 1905-1942
- The Strand Magazine, George Newnes, 1902-1930
- Sunday Reading for the Young, Wells Gardner, Darton, and Co., 1902-1915
- The Tatler, Nineteen Hundred Publishing, 1904-1937
- Tiny Tots, Cassell, 1907-1926
- The Wide World Magazine, George Newnes, 1902-1924
- Wonderland Annual, Amalgamated Press, 1920-1929
- Zoo, Odhams, 1936-1938

=== Books ===
Illustrated, and occasionally authored or co-authored, by Harry Rountree. A representative sample from a total, with editions, numbering in excess of 400. Source:

- Harry Rountree, The Animal Game Book, George Allen, 1903
- Harry Rountree, The Child's Book of Knowledge, Grant Richards, 1903
- Harry Rountree & S H Hamer, Quackles Junior, Cassell, 1903
- Harry A. Spurr (ed.), Fairy Tales by Dumas, Frederick A. Stokes, 1904
- Harry Rountree & S H Hamer, Archibald's Amazing Adventure, Or, The Tip-top Tale, Cassell, 1905
- E. Nesbit, Pug Peter, Alf Cooke, 1905
- S H Hamer & Harry Rountree, The Young Gullivers, Cassell, 1906
- Amy Steadman (ed.), Stories from Grimm, T C & E C Jack, 1906
- Joel Chandler Harris, Uncle Remus, Thomas Nelson, 1906
- J James Ridge, Toksikatem Castle, S W Partridge, 1906
- Harry Rountree, Harry Rountree's Annual, Cassell, 1907
- Alton Towers, Billy Bunce, Alf Cooke, 1907
- G. E. Mitton (ed.), The Swiss Family Robinson, A & C Black, 1907
- Bertram Atkey, Folk of the Wild, Grant Richards, 1907
- Lewis Carroll, Alice's Adventures in Wonderland, Thomas Nelson, 1908
- S H Hamer, The Forest Foundling, Duckworth, 1908
- S H Hamer, The Dolomites, Methuen, 1910
- Bernard Darwin, The Golf Courses of the British Isles, Duckworth, 1910
- Baldwin S Harvey, The Magic Dragon, Duckworth, 1911
- various writers, The Spell of the Open Air, T N Foulis, c.1912
- Richard Jefferies, Bevis, The Story of a Boy, Duckworth, 1913
- Charles S Bayne (ed.), My Book of Best Fairy Tales, Cassell, 1915
- Harry Rountree, Rountree's Ridiculous Rabbits (1 & 2), H Stevenson, 1916
- Christine Chaundler, Little Squirrel Tickletail, Cassell, 1917
- Albert Bigelow Paine, The Arkansaw Bear, George G. Harrap, 1919
- Sir William Schooling, The Hudson's Bay Company 1670-1920, HBC, 1920
- Blanche Winder (retold by), Aesop's Fables, Ward, Lock, 1924
- Mabel Marlowe, The Wiggly Weasel, Basil Blackwell, 1924
- Who's Who at the Zoo, Dean's Rag Book Co., 1925
- Mabel Marlowe, Lazy Lob, Basil Blackwell, 1926
- Lewis Carroll, Alice in Wonderland & Through the Looking Glass, Collins Clear-Type Press, 1928
- Hector Bolitho, The New Zealanders, J. M. Dent, 1928
- Richard P Russ, Caesar, The Life Story of a Panda Leopard, G. P. Putnam's Sons, 1930
- Lynda Rountree, Ronald, Rupert and Reg, Frederick Warne, 1930
- L & H Rountree and C E Bradley, Dicky Duck & Wonderful Walter, Frederick Warne, 1931
- Olwen Bowen, Beetles and Things, Elkin Mathews, 1931
- Aesop's Fables, Collins, Children's Press, 1934
- A Book about Animals, Blackie & Son, 1934
- Peter Lawless (ed.), The Golfer's Companion, J M Dent, 1937
- High Jinks, Birn Brothers, 1937
- Olive Dehn, The Nixie from Rotterdam, Basil Blackwell, 1937
- Viola Bayley, The Ways of Wonderland, James Nisbet, 1937
- Enid Blyton, The Children of Cherry Tree Farm, Country Life, 1940
- Enid Blyton, The Secret Mountain, Basil Blackwell, 1941
- Christine Chaundler, The Odd Ones, Country Life, 1941
- Little Things, WHC [W H Cornelius], c.1944
- Charles Heslop, The Farmyard in Spring [one of four], c.1945
- Winifred Humphreys, Wog & Wig, Franklyn Ward & Wheeler, 1947
- Hugh Gardner, Bruno Bear, Edmund Ward, 1951
