= Katrine Mackay =

NZ journalist, novelist, food writer and cook

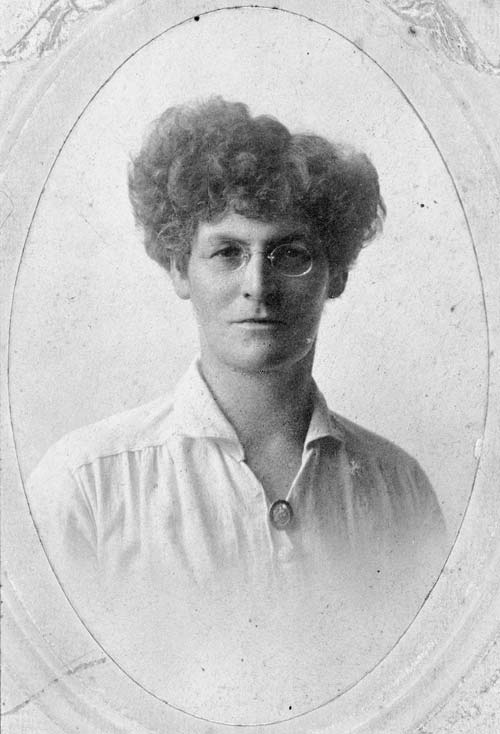
- Mackay, c. 1914
- Born: Catherine Julia Bilston; 12 November 1864; Merino, Victoria, Australia
- Died: 28 March 1944 (aged 79); Christchurch, New Zealand
- Occupations: Journalist; novelist; cook
- Spouse: John William Mackay (m. 1890; died 1919)
- Children: Mona Tracy; Ian Mackay
- Writing career
- Pen name: Katrine

Catherine Julia Mackay (née Bilston; 12 November 1864 – 28 March 1944), known by her pen name Katrine, was an Australian-born New Zealand journalist, novelist and cook. She was best known for her elegant social columns and for her bestselling book, Practical Home Cookery Chats and Recipes (1929). She has been described as the first of New Zealand's great food writers.

== Early life and family ==
Mackay was born in Merino, Victoria, Australia on 12 November 1864. Her parents were Ellen Augustine McElligott and her husband, George Yarra Bilston, an innkeeper and grazier, and she was the fifth of their nine children. Mackay grew up on a sheep station and attended school until the age of 10.

Mackay began writing as a teenager and by age 17 had published a serial novel, Eve's Sacrifice, in The Australian Journal. She had also had novellas and short stories published in The Australasian, the Hamilton Spectator and the Sydney Bulletin.

On 16 September 1890 she married John William Mackay, a New Zealander, and their daughter Mona Innis (later a children's novelist) was born in Adelaide in 1892. Shortly after, they moved to Whangārei in New Zealand, where their son Cyril Augustine (known as Ian) was born in 1894. Mackay and her husband both worked on his family's fruit farm, and after three years moved to Auckland and then in 1900 to Paeroa, where her husband worked as an auctioneer.

== Journalism career ==
Mackay's husband deserted the family in around 1902 and she returned to Auckland with the children, where she supported the family by working as a journalist for the Auckland Weekly News. She later claimed to be the first woman on the staff of the newspaper's publisher Wilson and Horton, who also published the New Zealand Herald. In 1904 she began to write the social column for the newspaper under the name of "Katrine". Her writing was known for its elegant prose and for refusing to pander to Auckland's social climbers. On her departure from the newspaper in 1908 she was presented with a "handsome dressing case".

In August 1908 she began working as the "lady editor" of the New Zealand Times in Wellington, for nearly twice the pay, and in 1909 was the creator and a founding member of the Pioneer Club, a social club for women. However, she was exhausted by the long hours at the Times and by the stress of paying for her son's school fees. She suffered a nervous breakdown and resigned in November 1909, after which she returned to live in Auckland. During the First World War she ran a tea kiosk in the suburb of Parnell. When her estranged husband died in 1919 she left Auckland and moved to Canterbury where her daughter was now living, where she worked as a cook for many years on several sheep stations.

In 1926 Mackay returned to journalism and for 18 months was the woman's editor for the Weekly Press, a weekly edition of The Press, until it ceased publication in October 1928. She published a best-selling book in 1929, Practical Home Cookery Chats and Recipes (1929), and briefly worked for the New Zealand Life and Home Magazine. Writer David Veart said in 2009 that she was the first New Zealand food writer "to recognise that Mediterranean cooking and Asian ingredients have a greater affinity to the New Zealand climate and way of life than the heavy dishes of foggy old [England]". She continued to write regularly on a variety of topics, using nearly 20 different pseudonyms, for publications such as Aussie, the Otago Witness and The Sun.

In the mid-1930s she spoke on several radio broadcasts about her experiences in journalism, including the heavy workload and the particular difficulties of being a female journalist, such as harassment on late night assignments by police and members of the public. In 1937, the New Zealand Railways Magazine referred to her as "the veteran of New Zealand woman journalists", and noted that when she first took up journalism at the start of the century, "the powers were very dubious about the 'innovation' of a lady reporter".

Mackay died in Christchurch on 28 March 1944. Her son became a newspaper editor and her daughter became herself a prolific journalist and an author under the name Mona Tracy.
