= Herbert Thomas =

Herbert Thomas may refer to:

- Herbert Joseph Thomas (1918–1943), United States Marine Corps sergeant and Medal of Honor recipient
- Herbert Henry Thomas (1876–1935), British geologist
- Bert Thomas (Herbert Samuel Thomas, 1883–1966), British political cartoonist
- Herb Thomas (Herbert Watson Thomas, 1923–2000), NASCAR driver
- Herb Thomas (outfielder) (Herbert Mark Thomas, 1902–1991), baseball player and manager
- Herb Thomas (pitcher) (Herb Thomas, born 1910), Negro league baseball player
- Bon Thomas (Herbert Arthur Thomas, 1911–1995), Australian politician

== See also ==
- Bert Thomas (disambiguation)
