= William Russell Flint =

Scottish artist and illustrator (1880–1969)

Sir William Russell Flint RA ROI
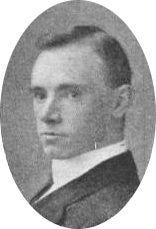
- c. 1909
- Born: 4 April 1880; Edinburgh, Scotland
- Died: 30 December 1969 (aged 89); London, England
- Education: Daniel Stewart's College; Edinburgh Institution; Heatherley School of Fine Art
- Children: Francis Murray Russell Flint

Sir William Russell Flint RA ROI (4 April 1880 – 30 December 1969) was a Scottish artist, painter and illustrator who was known especially for his watercolours of women. He also worked in oils, tempera, and printmaking.

== Biography ==
Flint was born in Edinburgh on 4 April 1880 and was educated at Daniel Stewart's College and then Edinburgh Institution. From 1894 to 1900 Flint was apprenticed as a lithographic draughtsman while taking classes at the Royal Institute of Art, Edinburgh. From 1900 to 1902 he worked as a medical illustrator in London while studying part-time at the Heatherley School of Fine Art. He furthered his art education by studying independently at the British Museum. He was an artist for The Illustrated London News from 1903 to 1909, and produced illustrations for editions of several books, including H Rider Haggard's King Solomon's Mines (1907 edition), W. S. Gilbert's Savoy Operas (1909), Sir Thomas Malory's Le Morte d'Arthur (1910–1911) and Chaucer's The Canterbury Tales (1912).

Flint was one of the leading illustrators selected by Percy Bradshaw for inclusion in his The Art of the Illustrator (1917-1918) which presented a separate portfolio for each of twenty illustrators which was accompanied by a plate showing an illustration typical of Flint's work and five other plates showing the work at five earlier stages of its production. Flint's coloured illustration shows one naked and one half naked young woman picking fruit on a sea shore.

Flint was elected president of Britain's Royal Society of Painters in Watercolours (now the Royal Watercolour Society) in 1936 to 1956, and knighted in 1947.

During visits to Spain, Flint was impressed by Spanish dancers, and he depicted them frequently throughout his career. He enjoyed considerable commercial success but little respect from art critics, who were disturbed by a perceived crassness in his eroticized treatment of the female figure, clearly borrowing inspiration from similar works by Lawrence Alma-Tadema.

Flint was also a published author of short stories. In 1965, a collection of his short stories were published as a limited edition of 500 titled Shadows in Arcady; for which Flint designed the graphical layout and the illustrations.

== Illustrations to Savoy Operas ==
Savoy Operas is a collection of four opera librettos by W. S. Gilbert that had been set to music by Arthur Sullivan, published in 1909.

Princess Ida

"I can tell a woman's age in half a minute—and I do!"

"Must we, till then, in prison cell be thrust?"

Enter Princess, reading.

Enter the "Daughters of the Plough," bearing Luncheon.

Frontispiece to Savoy Operas

The Gate yields. Hildebrand and Soldiers rush in.

"Though I am but a girl, / Defiance thus I hurl."

"Where are your rifles, pray?"
