= Hubert Thomas =

Hubert Thomas may refer to:

- Hubert George Octavius Thomas (1857–1922), architect in Brisbane, Queensland, Australia
- Hubert Thomas, musician on The Voice of the Turtle (album)
- Hubert Thomas (rugby), in 2013 NACRA Rugby Championship

== See also ==
- Bert Thomas (disambiguation)
