= Claude Allin Shepperson =

Artist, illustrator, and joke cartoonist

- Born: 25 October 1867; Beckenham, Kent, England.
- Died: 30 December 1921 (aged 54); Chelsea, London, England
- Other names: Claude Shepperson
- Occupations: Painter, illustrator, and joke cartoonist
- Years active: 1891 – 1921
- Known for: His skill in composition

Claude Allin Shepperson ARA ARWS ARE RI RMS (25 October 1867 – 30 December 1921) was a British artist, illustrator, and printmaker specializing mainly in social scenes and landscapes.

== Early life ==
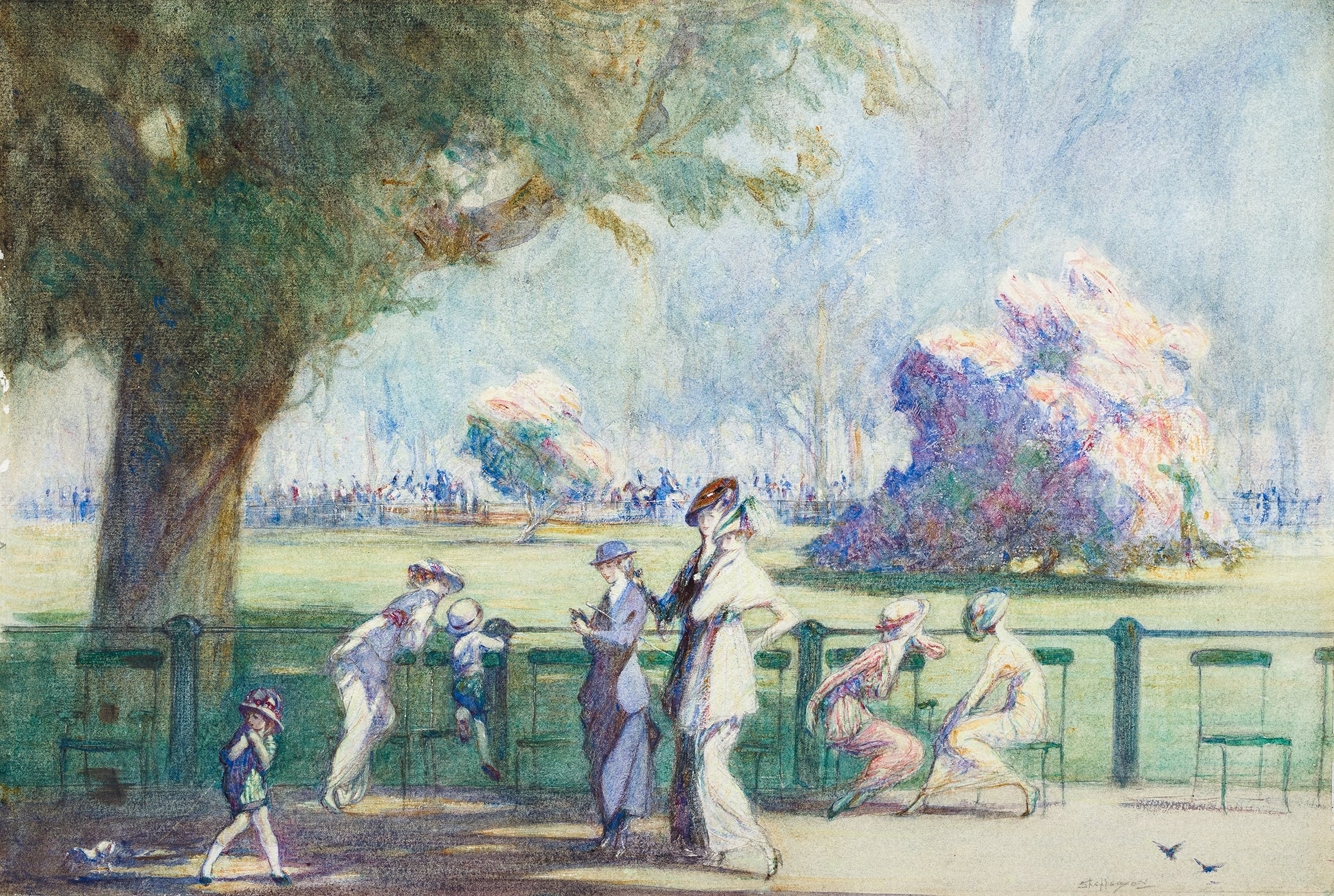
Claude Allin Shepperson - The Lady of Fashion of the 20th Century In Hyde Park

He was born in Beckenham, Kent, England on 25 October 1867, to Allin Thomas Shepperson of Winsland Bargerton, South Devon, and Florence Mary, the eldest daughter of William Hinkes Cox, Justice of the Peace.. He was baptised in Beckenham on 3 April 1868. Shepperson was educated privately, but spent 1880 to 1882 at Weymouth College. He began to train for a legal career when he abandoned this and began to study painting instead, attending the Heatherley School of Fine Art in 1891. He then travelled to Paris to study art there.

Shepperson married Mary Isabel (born 2 November 1868), the only daughter of Arthur Wellesley George Adey (born 6 January 1827) of the Indian Medical Service, in St. Mary Magdalen's in St. Leonards-on-Sea, Hastings, on Tuesday, July 10, 1894. Mary was given away by her father. The marriage was a choral service, and the couple received over 150 wedding presents. The couple had two children, a girl Barbara Isabel A. (born third quarter 1895) and a boy, Derek Allin Adey Shepperson (29 June 1898 – 15 September 1923).

Shepperson worked in a wide variety of media including oil, watercolour, chalk, charcoal, pastel, ink and pencil, and he was a practised etcher and lithographer. Bryant notes that for line drawings, Shepperson "would first sketch nudes in charcoal on very thin banknote paper and draw clothes in ink over this, usually at near-reproduction size." Percy Bradshaw, commenting on a Punch reader's remark that Shepperson was a "Sketcher of Aristocrats", said that Shepperson would rather be called "an aristocrat who sketches".

Shepperson was one of the leading illustrators selected by Percy Bradshaw for inclusion in his The Art of the Illustrator (1917–1918) which presented a separate portfolio for each of twenty illustrators. (Note: The portfolio contained: a brief biography of Shepperson, an illustration of Shepperson at work in his studio, an explanation of Shepperson's method of working. This was accompanied by a plate showing an illustration typical of his work and five other plates showing the work at five earlier stages of its production, from the first rough to the just before the finished drawing or colour sketch. Shepperson's pen and ink illustration shows two women with a girl and a pet under a tree in a park. This is presumably Kensington Gardens, which Shepperson often used as a background. The way in which Shepperson built up his illustration from sketches of different elements is clearly shown.) Shepperson was also a tutor at Bradshaw's Press Art School, and provided feedback on the work submitted by students.

Shepperson exhibited widely, (Note: Johnson and Greutzner show Shepperson exhibiting 256 works at the Leicester Galleries, 68 at the Ridley Art Club, (Note: This was a little-known exhibiting society that held exhibitions at the Grafton Galleries between 1889 and c. 1919. It had been founded by students of the painter Matthew Ridley.), 39 at the Royal Academy, 38 at the Royal Watercolour Society, 17 at the Walker Gallery, 16 at the Glasgow Institute of the Fine Arts, 12 at the Fine Art Society, eight at the Royal Society of Painters in Water Colours, five at the London Salon, four at the Manchester City Art Gallery, two at the Abbey Gallery, (Note: This was a minor gallery at 2 Victoria Street in Westminster, London) and one each at The Grosvenor Gallery, (Note: This presumably refers to the second gallery know by this name (there have been three), The second was established by P. & D. Colnaghi & Co. and Knoedler in 1912, with American artist and critic Francis Howard as the managing director.) The International Society, Royal Society of Miniature Painters, Sculptors and Gravers and the Royal Scottish Academy.) and his work is held in many notable galleries. These include the Tate Gallery, the British Museum, the Victoria and Albert Museum, Birmingham Museum and Art Gallery and the National Museum of Wales.

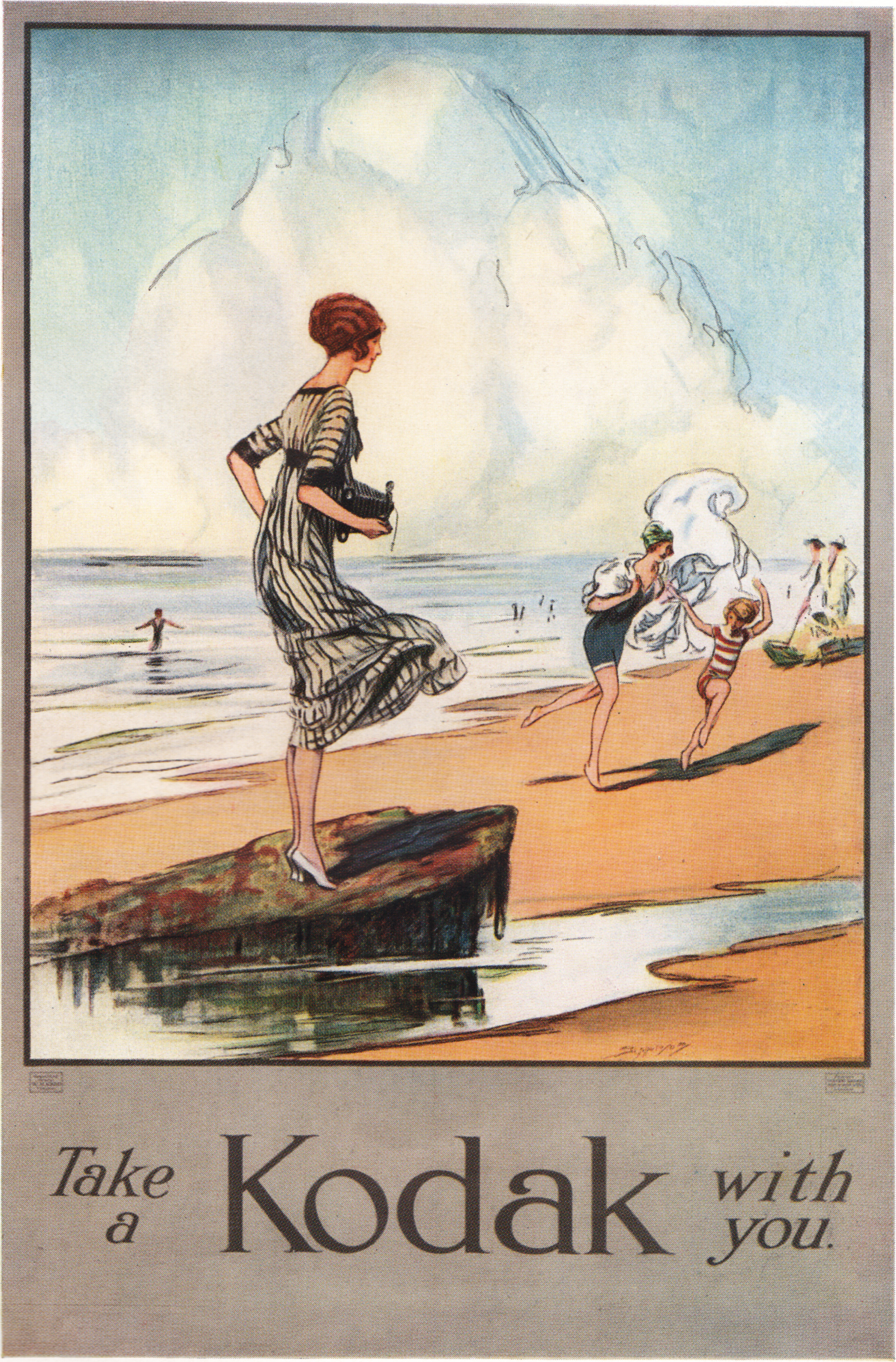
Claude A Shepperson Kodak

Sheppersons was not only a painter, a book and magazine illustrator, a cartoonist for Punch, but also a commercial artist, producing images for advertisements.

== Later life ==
Shepperson was elected a member of the Royal Society of Miniature Painters, Sculptors and Gravers (RMS) in 1900, and also of the Royal Institute of Painters in Water Colours (RI) in that year. Five years later, in 1905, Shepperson resigned his membership of the RI. In 1910 he was elected an Associate of the Royal Watercolour Society. In 1919 he was elected both an Associate of the Royal Academy, (Note: Associate status was created in 1769 in order to generate a pool of artists from which to elect full Academicians. The grade of membership was abolished In June 1991, and all then ARAs became RAs.) and of the Royal Society of Painter-Etchers and Engravers (ARE) (Note: The Royal Society of Painter-Etchers and Engravers became the Royal Society of Painter-Printmakers in 1991. Newly elected Members, being Associate Members, are entitled to use ‘ARE’ after their name.)

Shepperson was at his studio at 5 Mulberry Walk, Chelsea, London when he died on 30 December 1921. Gerald William Shepperson was his executor and his estate was valued at £1,852 0s. 3d. He is buried at Brompton Cemetery in London.

== Assessment ==
Shepperson's style of drawing was much admired. Ellwood stated that Shepperson was "an inspired draughtsman who can give us the smartest English girl or the rustiest farm hand with equal penetration in a style which is always distinguished." He also said that his work shows the perfect combination of naturalistic drawings and decorative qualities, and that Shepperson "was the greatest master of placing or composition in English pen drawing", and that "his drawings should be analysed and pondered over by students." He noted that Shepperson had begun as a "costume" illustrator, but that he had later "turned to the society note, for which his temperament was admirably fitted", and that his drawings in Punch were "classic examples of the ultimate in patrician atmosphere."

Peppin and Micklethwait say that Shepperson "specialised in Society Scenes based on sketches from life in Kensington Gardens and elsewhere in the West End" and this his sketches were "drawn with great elegance in a hazy and slightly elongated manner and often featuring the ‘Shepperson Girl’ who embodied every contemporary notion of aristocratic refinement."

Houfe called him "a graceful artist whose work is at its best when children and pretty young women are involved". Sketchley stated of him that "The energy of his line, the dramatic quality of his imagination, render him in his element as an illustrator of events" and the vigour that projects itself into moments of action also inform his representation of moments when there is no action.

In his survey of illustration in the 1890s Thorpe said that Sheppersons' drawings for Sketch were "full of that promise which was afterwards fulfilled", and that his colourful pen-and-ink drawings for a story in The Idler were excellent and distinguished.

== Example of illustration ==
=== Illustration for a book ===
Shepperson prepared the following pen and ink illustration for a 1899 reissue of the 1851 book Lavengro: The Scholar, the Gypsy, the Priest by George Borrow. The book falls between a memoir and a novel and is the first part of a two book sequence, with The Romany Rye (1857) continuing the story directly from the end of Lavengro. Images by courtesy of the British Library.

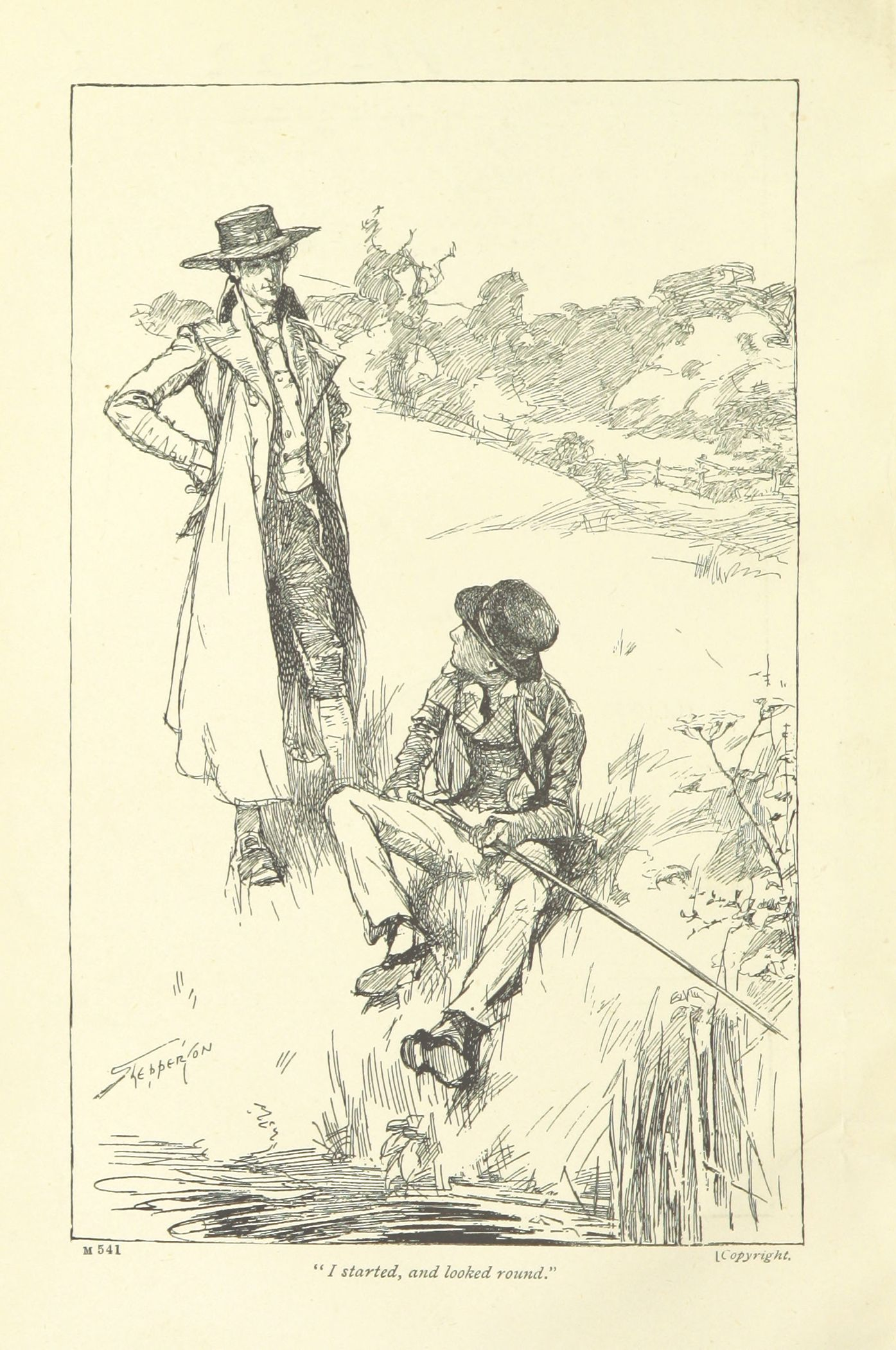
1

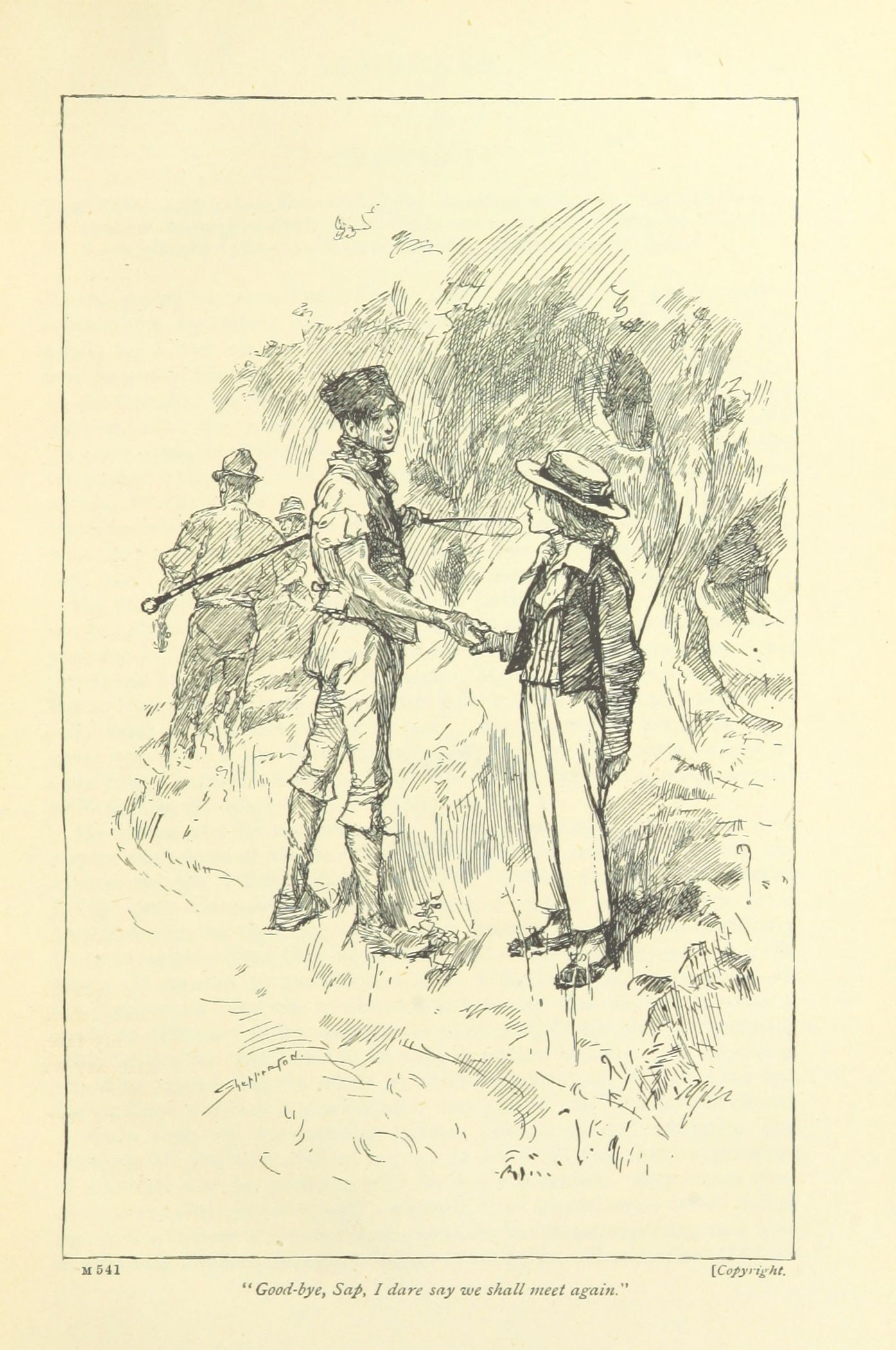
2

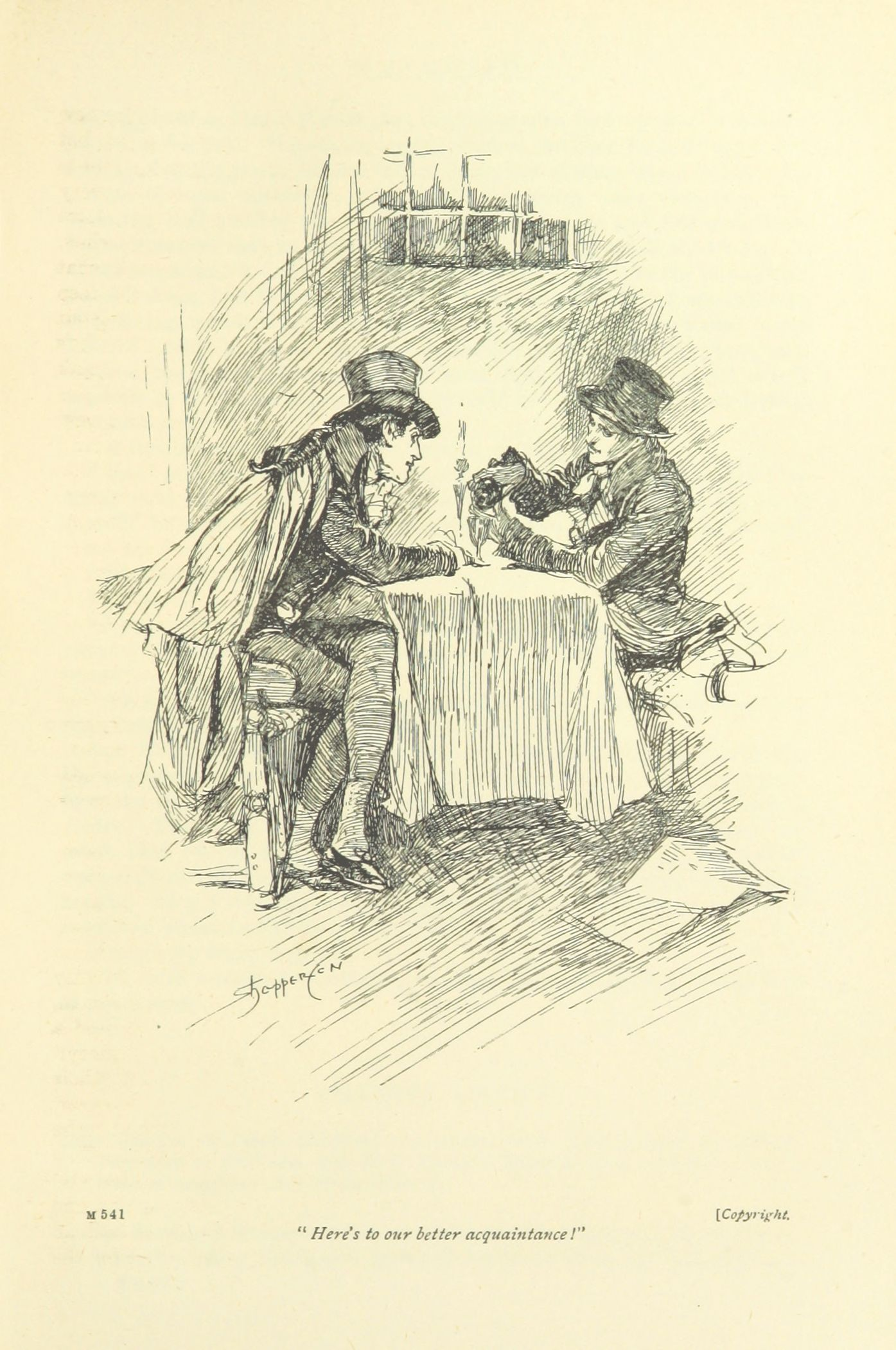
3

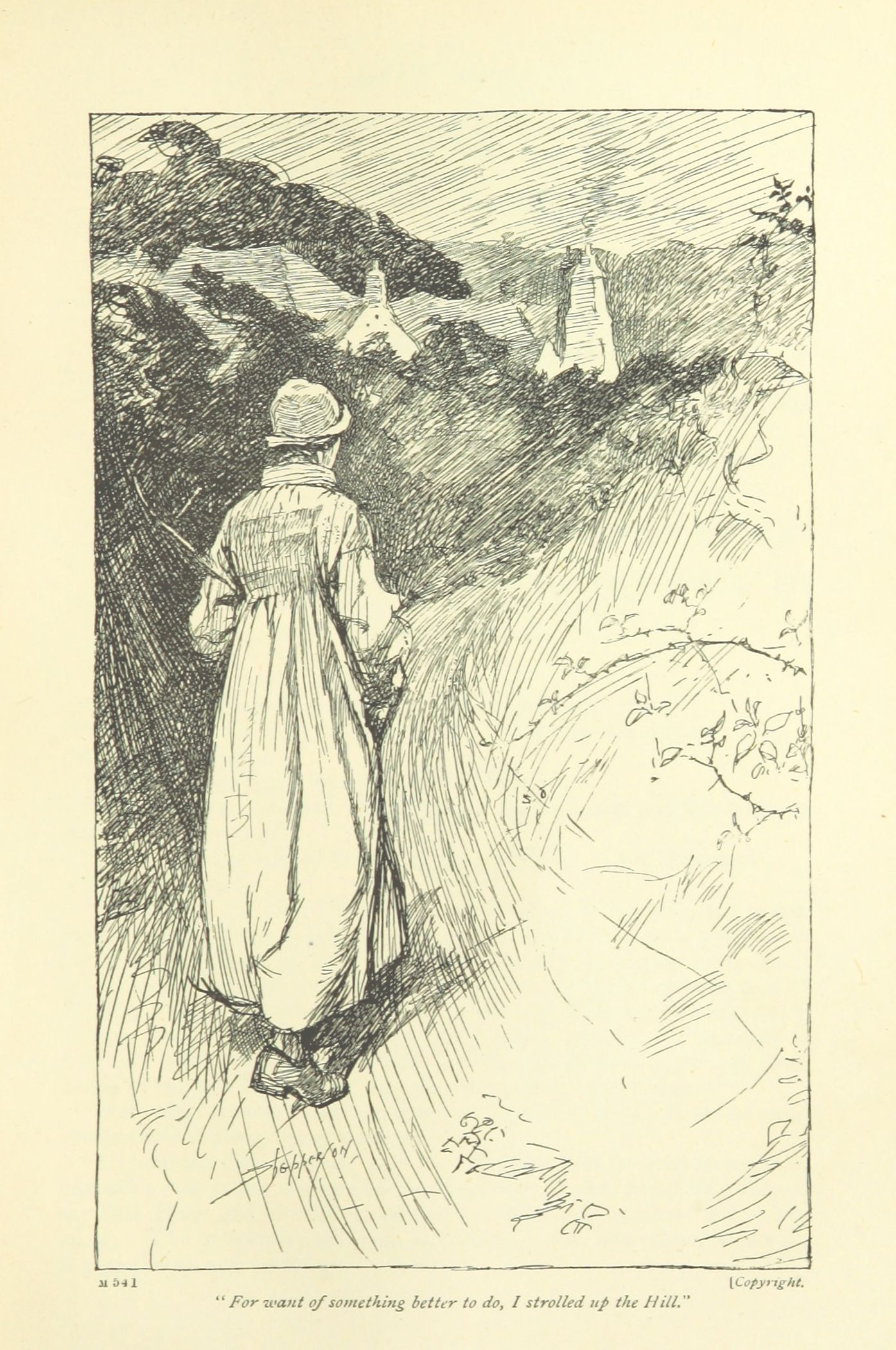
4

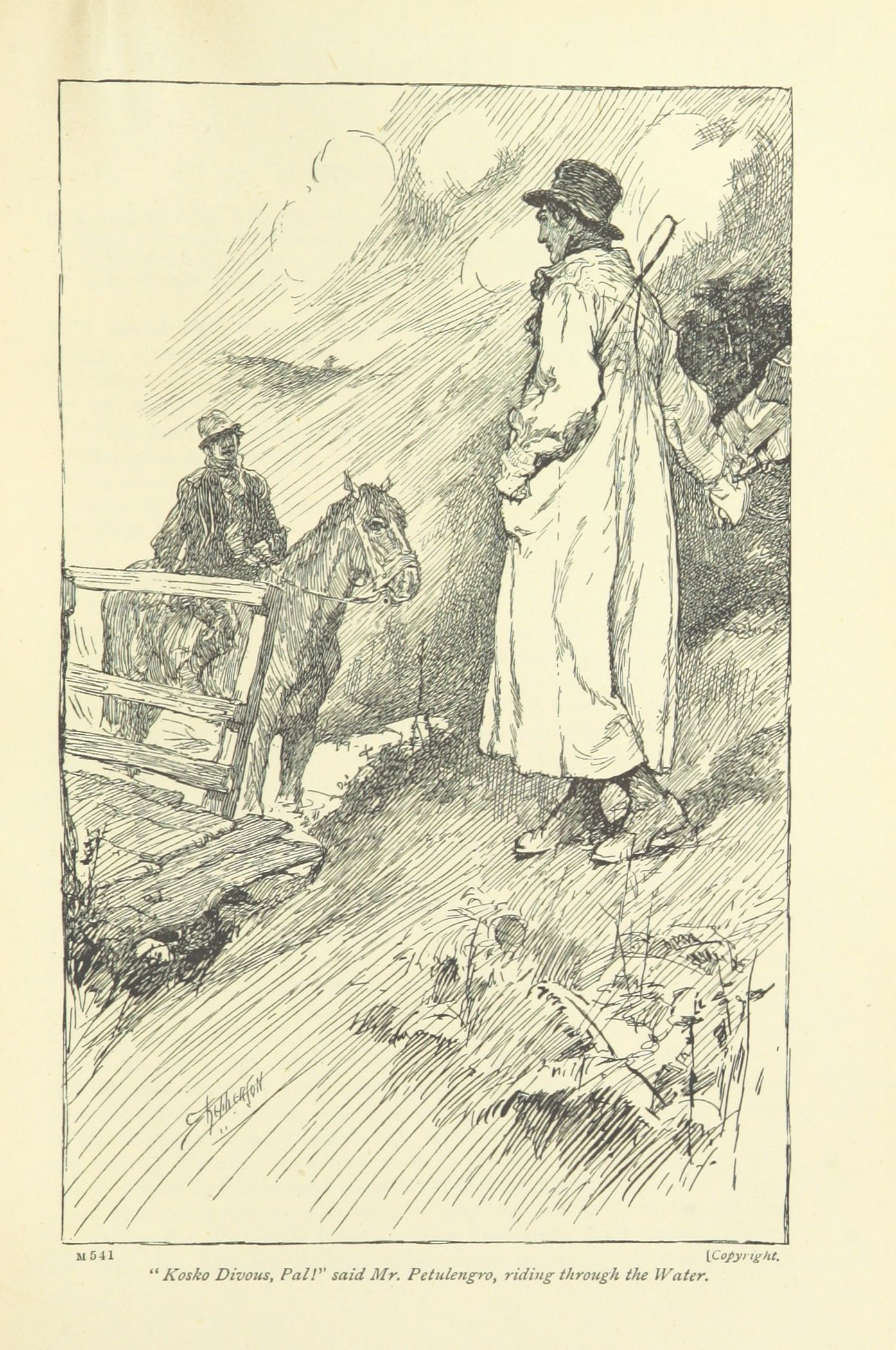
5

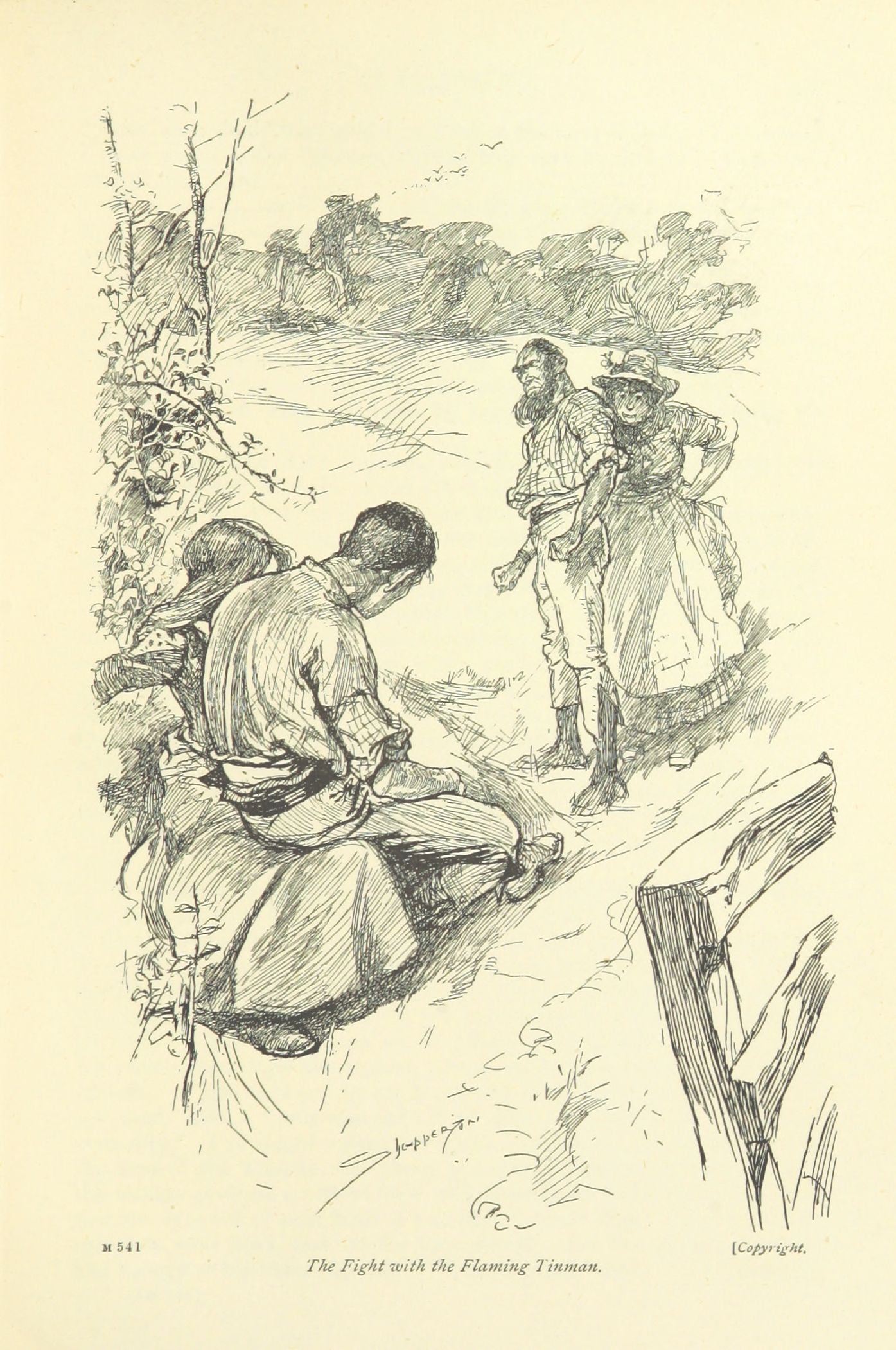
6
