= Margaret Tarrant =

English painter (1888–1959)

Margaret Winifred Tarrant
- Born: 19 August 1888; Battersea, London, England
- Died: 28 July 1959 (aged 70); Cornwall, England
- Education: Clapham School of Art; Heatherley's School of Art; Guildford School of Art
- Occupations: Children's author and illustrator; Christian artist
- Years active: 1908–1952
- Known for: Illustrations of fairies, children, religious subjects
- Notable work: The Water Babies; Forest Fairies; Nursery Rhymes
- Parent(s): Percy Tarrant and Sarah Wyatt

Alice meets the White Rabbit, by Margaret Winifred Tarrant, 1916

Margaret Winifred Tarrant (19 August 1888 – 28 July 1959) was an English illustrator, and children's author, specializing in depictions of fairy-like children and religious subjects. She began her career at the age of 20, and painted and published into the early 1950s. She was known for her children's books, postcards, calendars, and print reproductions.

== Biography ==
Tarrant was born in Battersea in South London, England, on 19 August 1888, the only child of landscape painter and illustrator Percy Tarrant and his wife Sarah Wyatt. She began drawing at an early age and never lost her love of drawing or interest in art in general. As a child she used to play at art shows and invite her parents inside a tent she made of a clothes horse and dust sheets to view her drawings pinned up inside. She attended Clapham High School (1898–1905), where she won several prizes for her art. She then attended the Clapham School of Art, where she started to train as an art teacher in 1905 (presumably at the Clapham School of Art), but after discussion with her father abandoned this to become a full time watercolour painter and book illustrator. Her father encouraged her to take up illustration.

Her parents died within three months of each other in 1934 and Tarrant moved to Peaslake in Surrey in c. 1935. Tarrant never married, but made many loyal and enduring friends, both through her painting and her church membership. Much of her life centred on the activities of her parish church. She helped arrange sales of work for the Church Missionary Society and at one time provided her car and acted as driver for the Vicar, who had no car of his own. Her health and eyesight deteriorated notably in 1953, and by 1958 she felt too unwell to run her home in Peaslake, and joined fellow illustrator Molly Brett in Cornwall in 1958. However she was very ill by this time and spent several months in hospital.

Tarrant died on 28 July 1959. Her estate was valued at £17,413 2s 8d, and after leaving some pictures to friends, she left the rest of her estate to twelve charities.

== Work ==
Tarrant began her career by designing Christmas Cards, but it was her book illustration that brought her success and fame. Among the publishers she produced cards for were the Medici Society, (Note: Despite the name the Medici Society is not a learned society or a charity but a commercial publisher.) Hale, Cushman and Flint of Boston, Massachusetts, C. W. Faulkner, and Humphrey Milford. Her postcards were popular, and the illustrations she made for Nursery Rhymes (1914) were reissued as 48 best-selling postcards.

Although she was already an established artist she still took courses, first at the Heatherley School of Fine Art in 1918, 1921, and 1923. After moving to Peaslake in Surrey she took a course at the Guildford School of Art, where she met and befriended the illustrator Molly Brett.

She enjoyed a long and fruitful association with The Medici Society, who published her postcards, calendars, prints and other works. She started working regularly with Medici in 1920, and they still publish her work. Her work is still popular and remains in print, as greeting cards, postcards and prints. The Medici Society sponsored a six-week trip to Palestine in 1934, and part of her illustrated diary of the trip was published as A Journey to the Holy Land in 1988. She became a Medici Society shareholder in 1938. The Society published a short booklet, Margaret Tarrant and her Pictures, in 1982.

Her pretty, naturalistic illustrations were widely known and very popular, particularly in the 1920s and 1930s, when she was very prolific and famous. Horne notes that "Her delicately coloured and rather sentimental watercolours and pen and ink drawings have remained extremely popular to this day."

Tarrant exhibited mainly in Birmingham, as, as follows: 23 works at the Royal Birmingham Society of Artists, two works at the Cooling & Sons Gallery, two works at the Dudley Gallery and New Dudley Gallery, eight works at the Walker Art Gallery, Liverpool, four works at the Royal Academy, and two works at the Society of Women Artists.

== Selected publications ==
=== Books ===
The illustrations which made her reputation at only 20 years of age (Note: She got the commission when she was 19.) were for The Water Babies in 1908.

Book cover by Tarrant

- The Water Babies (1908)
- Autumn Gleanings from the Poets (1910)
- Fairy Stories from Hans Christian Andersen (1910)
- Contes (Charles Perrault, 1910)
- The Pied Piper of Hamelin (Robert Browning, 1912)
- Nursery Rhymes (1914)
- Alice in Wonderland (Lewis Carroll, 1914)
- A Picture Birthday Book for Boys and Girls (1915)
- Knock Three Times (Marion St John Webb, 1917)
- Verses for Children (1918)
- The Tooksy and Mary Alice Tales (1919)
- Our Day (1923)
- Rhymes of Old Times (1925)
- The Magic Lamplighter (Marion St John Webb, 1926)
- An Alphabet of Magic (Eleanor Farjeon, 1928)
- Mother Goose: Nursery Rhymes (1929)
- The Margaret Tarrant Birthday Book (1932)
- Joan in Flowerland (1935) co-written with Lewis Dutton
- The Margaret Tarrant Nursery Rhyme Book (1944)
- The Story of Christmas (1952)

=== Prints ===
- The Piper of Dreams
- He Prayeth Best
- The Wandering Minstrels, c. 1940
- Morning Carol
- Harvest home
