= Molly Brett =

English illustrator and children's author

Molly Brett (1902–1990) was an English illustrator and writer of children's literature, best known for her anthropomorphic artwork.

== Biography ==
Molly (Mary Elizabeth) Brett grew up in the English county of Surrey, surrounded by animals and nature. Her mother, Mary Gould Brett, was a painter who encouraged her daughter to paint from life. Molly painted animals in a naturalistic style, while also giving them human characteristics and activities.

Molly began her art training with a correspondence course in illustration, followed by formal instruction at Press Art School and the Guildford Art School. It was at Guildford that she met Margaret Tarrant (also destined to attain substantial fame as an illustrator), who soon became a close friend and lived with her in Cornwall. She began her career by illustrating "weekly papers" for children. One of her earliest commissions was to illustrate stories by Enid Blyton. Inspired by this, she went on to write and illustrate 21 books of her own for the Medici Society of London, with whom she was associated for sixty years. Medici has published over 500 of her paintings as postcards, greeting cards and prints.

Molly Brett's work has enchanted generations of children with its beautifully drawn details, subtle colours and magical atmosphere. Her work follows in the tradition of other twentieth-century "dressed animal" illustrators such as Beatrix Potter, Margaret Tempest, Racey Helps, and others.

== Bibliography ==
Brett's books include:

- A Little Garden (1937)
- A Surprise for Dumpy (1964)
- An Alphabet (1980)
- Drummer Boy Duckling (1945)
- Flip Flop's Secret (1970)
- Follow Me Around the Farm (1947)
- Goodnight Time Tales (1982)
- Jiggy's Treasure Hunt (1973)
- Master Bunny the Baker's Boy (1950)
- Midget and the Pet Shop (1975)
- Mr Turkey Runs Away (1948)
- My First Big Bumper Book (1939)
- Paddy Gets into Mischief (1972)
- Plush and Tatty on the Beach (1987)
- Robin Finds Christmas (1961)
- Teddy Flies Away (1972)
- The Adventures of Plush and Tatty (1985)
- The Japanese Garden (1960)
- The Forgotten Bear (1968)
- The Hare in a Hurry (1975)
- The Jumble Bears (1977)
- The Magic Spectacles and Other Tales (1987)
- The Molly Brett Picture Book (1979)
- The Party That Grew (1976)
- The Runaway Fairy (1982)
- The Story of a Toy Car (1938)
- The Untidy Little Hedgehog (1966)
- Tom Tit Moves House (1962)
- Two in a Tent (1969)
