= Percy Tarrant =

Percy Tarrant (1855–1934), was a British artist and illustrator.

== Biography ==
He was the father of fellow Illustrator, Margaret Tarrant.

== Work ==
Tarrant was a moderately active participant in exhibits and exhibited as follows: one work at the Royal Birmingham Society of Artists, four works at the Dudley Gallery and New Dudley Gallery, 18 works at the Walker Art Gallery, Liverpool, 22 works at the Royal Academy, one work at the Royal Society of British Artists, one work at the Royal Institute of Painters in Water Colours, and one work at the Royal Institute of Oil Painters.
