= Peter Lawless =

British author, rugby player, soldier and war correspondent (1891–1945)

- Born: 9 October 1891; London, England
- Died: 10 March 1945 (aged 53); Remagen, Germany
- Occupations: Author, journalist, rugby player, soldier and war correspondent

Major Philip Henry Lawless MC (9 October 1891 – 10 March 1945) was a British author, journalist, rugby player, soldier and war correspondent.

== Early life ==
Born in London on 9 October 1891, "Peter" Lawless spent much of his early life in Devon. He was educated at Bedford School between 1905 and 1910.

== First World War ==
Lawless' experiences during the First World War were drawn upon by his grandson, Sebastian Faulks, during the writing of his novel Birdsong, published in 1993.

Lawless enlisted in the 28th County of London Battalion of the London Regiment, and arrived in France on 28 October 1914. In May 1915, he transferred to the 18th Battalion, Middlesex Regiment, which was charged with clearing, repairing and building front-line trenches. In July 1916, the battalion was moved from its location near Béthune to assist in the attempted Capture of Fricourt. In 1917, Lawless was moved to the 26th Battalion, Middlesex Regiment, and was based in Salonika in November 1918. He was awarded the Military Cross in 1919 and left the British Army with the rank of Major.

== Sport ==
Lawless was well over six feet tall and was described by Michael Moynihan as "a burly, jovial man whose air of a hunting-shooting-fishing English squire went down well with the Yanks." Before the First World War, Lawless was a keen rower and rowed for the London Rowing Club eight which was defeated by the Union Boat Club in the 1914 Grand Challenge Cup. After the First World War he played in three rugby teams representing Great Britain, against New Zealand, South Africa and Canada, as well as for Richmond F.C., Middlesex, Surrey, Devon, the British Army, for the Barbarians against Leicester in 1920, 1922 and 1924, and against the East Midlands in 1922.

He was also a keen golfer, and was Golfing Correspondent of The Morning Post, writing under the pen name Vagrant. He published books on rugby and golf.

== Second World War ==
Lawless worked for The Morning Post until it was acquired by The Daily Telegraph, which he joined in 1937. After the outbreak of the Second World War, he accompanied the Royal Air Force in France, between September 1939 and May 1940, as The Daily Telegraph's correspondent. He joined the Army Intelligence Corps on 4 July 1940, but was released in 1944 to return to The Daily Telegraph as a war correspondent with the American First Army after the invasion of Normandy.

He was killed by shell fire in action in Remagen, Germany, whilst covering the taking of one of the last surviving bridges over the River Rhine in March 1945.
