= Leslie Hinge =

New Zealand photographer (1868–1942)

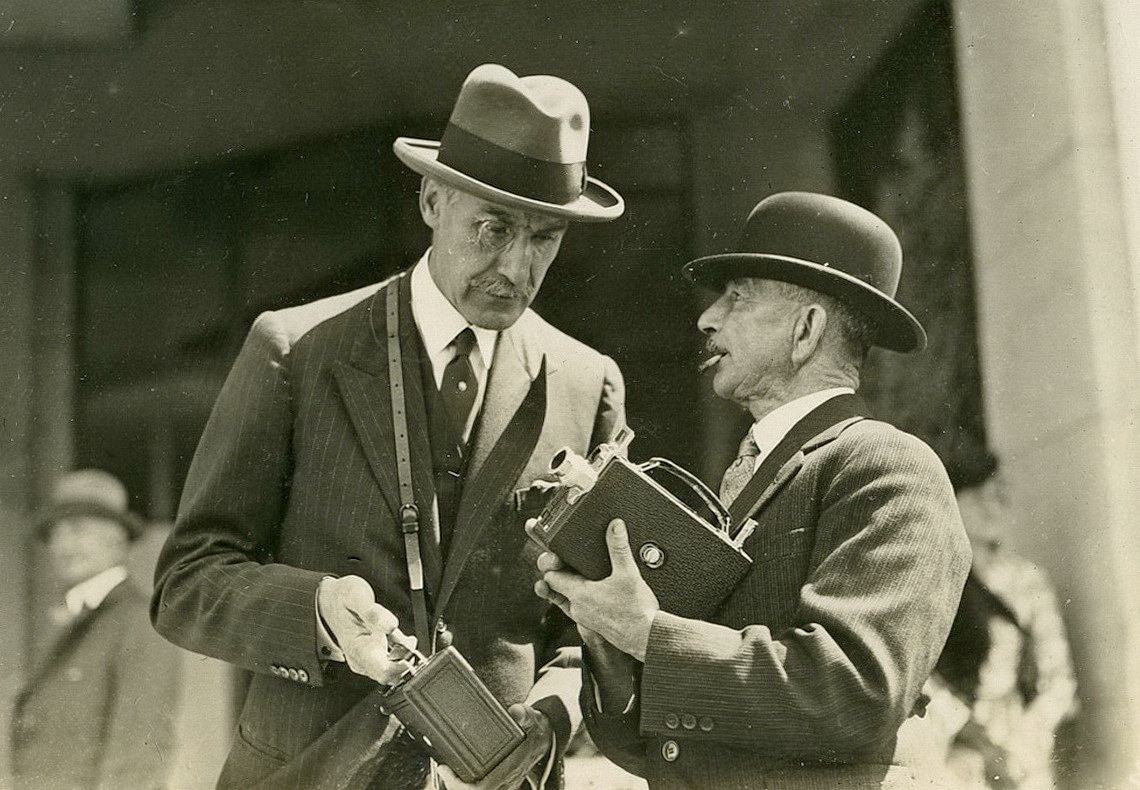
- Leslie Hinge (right) with NZ Governor Viscount Galway
- Born: Leslie Hinge; 16 January 1868; Christchurch
- Died: 21 June 1942 (aged 74); Wellington
- Occupation: Photographer
- Known for: NZ Photography
- Spouse: Blanche Hinge
- Children: 1 daughter (Lesley) 1 son (Cyril)

Leslie Hinge (16 January 1868 – 21 June 1942) was a prominent photographer from New Zealand.

== Early life ==
Hinge was born on 16 January 1868 in Woodend, around 26 km north of Christchurch. He was educated at Cook's private school and was first employed with the Railways Department as a cadet. Hinge then spent time travelling and working abroad, including ten years in the large farming territories of the Australian Outback.

When he arrived back in Christchurch in 1900 he began his career as a newspaper photographer for the Lyttelton Times. In 1902 he married Blanche Ethel Mohr.

== Career ==
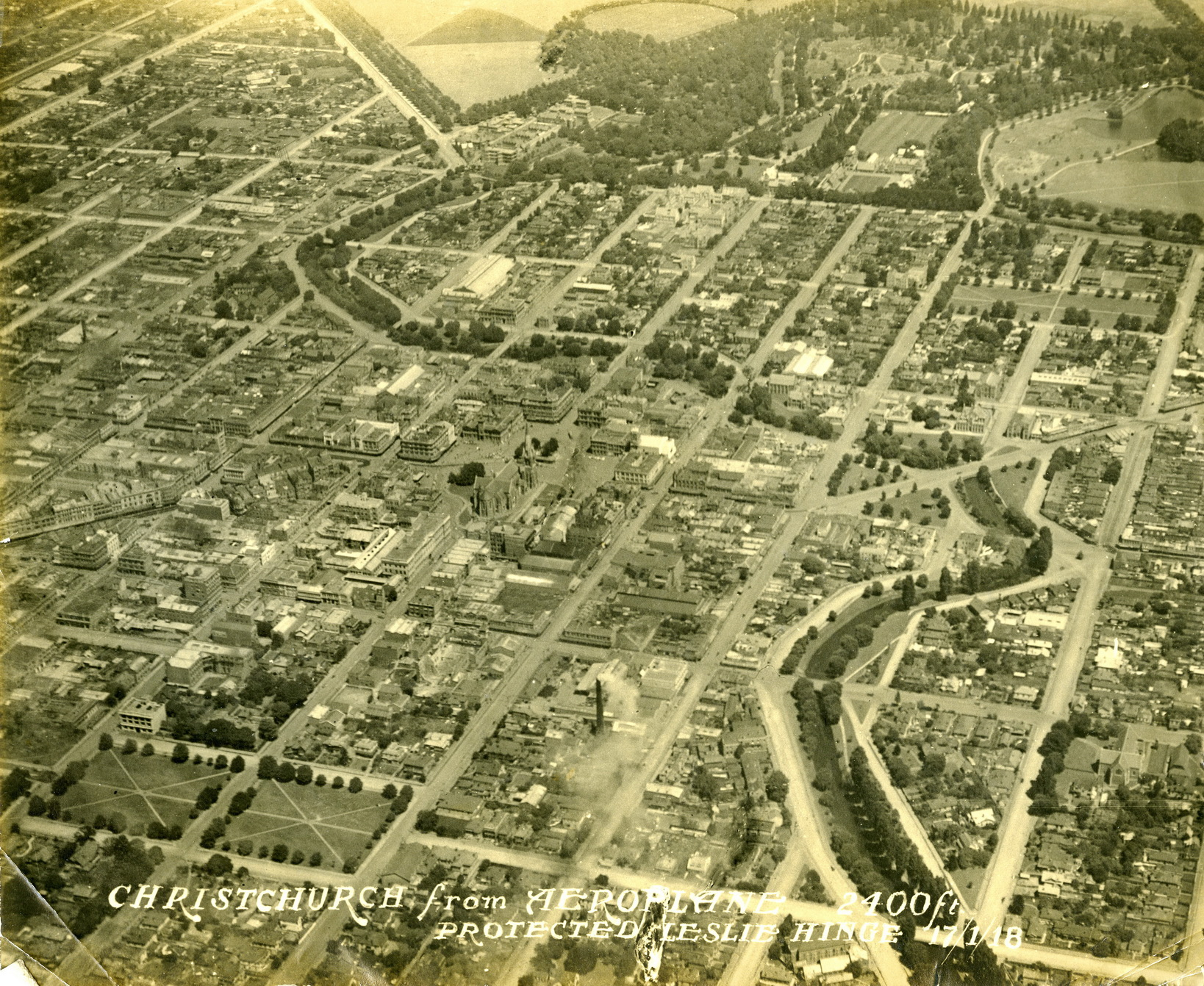
1st aerial photograph of Christchurch (1918)

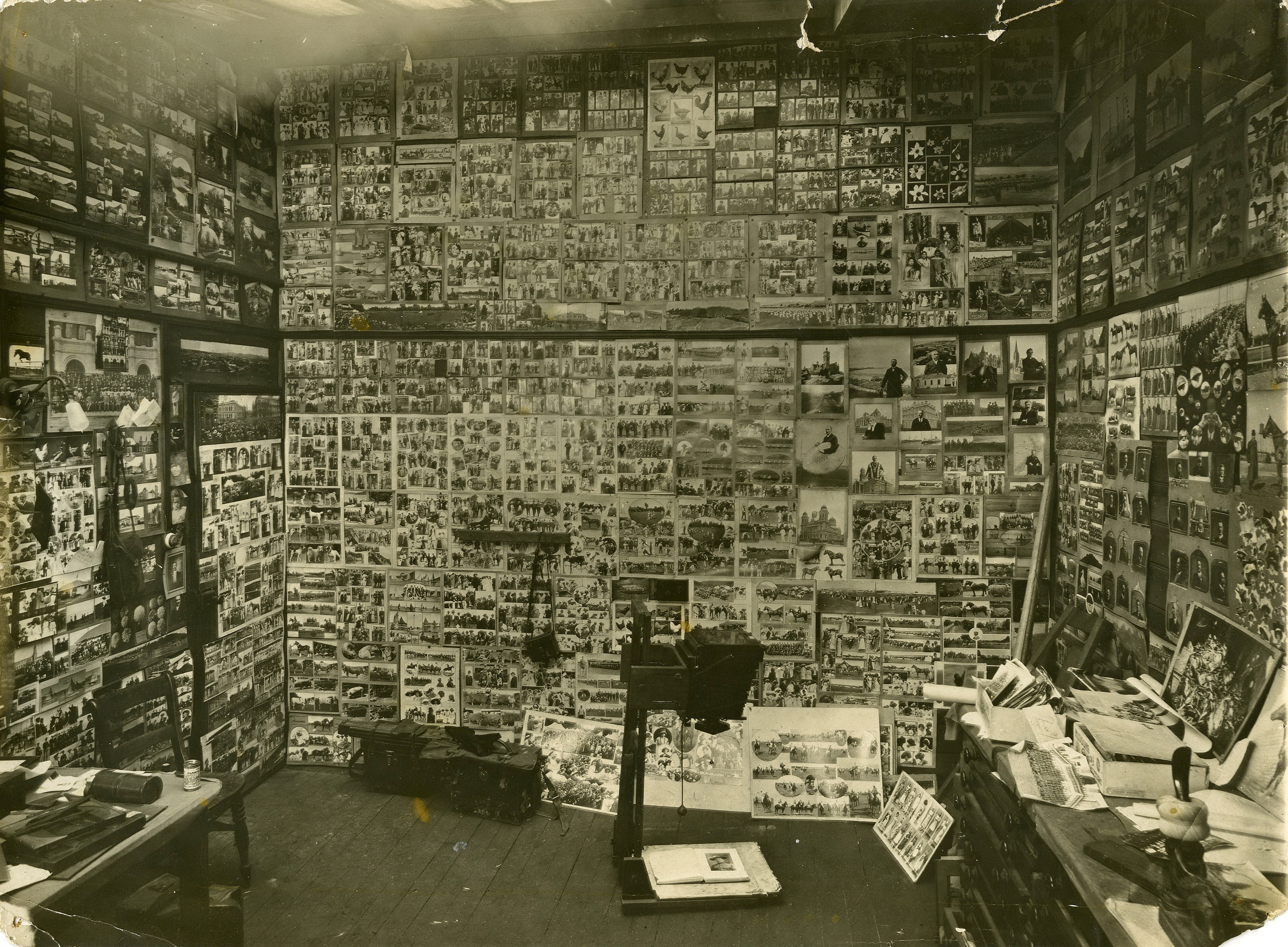
Leslie Hinge's studio in Christchurch

Hinge was an adventurous photographer. He trekked on foot through the King Country in 1900, covered the Cheviot earthquake in 1901, and was part of two rescue missions to find wrecked ships on remote islands. He travelled on horseback with surveyors mapping the proposed road between the East and West Coast of the South Island, and accompanied naturalists checking the growth of the Wapiti deer population in Fiordland. Hinge climbed Mount Ruapehu to photograph the crater, and his photographs of Aoraki / Mount Cook are credited with helping open up the district to tourism.

Along with landscape images Hinge became known for his photographs of New Zealand’s pastoral industries and some lesser-known occupations – gum digging, oyster culture, possum trapping, fishing, deer stalking, and the timber industry were all popular subjects. From November 1914 to December 1915 Hinge attended the Panama Pacific International Exposition in San Francisco. During this exhibition, Hinge won the World Gold Medal for photographic animal studies.

In 1918 Hinge became the first person to take aerial photographs of Christchurch from an aeroplane. In 1919 he became the staff photographer at the Auckland Weekly News, and in 1920/1921 became the first to photograph Wellington from the air. He covered all the Royal visits to New Zealand between the two world wars, and was in the first motor car to reach Murchison after the 1929 earthquake. By 1931 Hinge was a photographer with the New Zealand Railway Publicity department, retiring in 1940.

== Death ==
Leslie Hinge died on 21 June 1942. In his obituary in Wellington's Evening Post, he was described as "one of the first to realise that the Press photographer must also be a journalist in the news sense", and was credited with being a pioneer in adventure tourism photography.
