= Albert Thomas =

Albert Thomas may refer to:

- Albert Ernest Thomas (1872–1923), Australian politician
- Albert Thomas (minister) (1878–1932), French socialist politician, Minister of Armament
- Albert Thomas (cricketer) (1893–1965), Welsh cricketer
- Albert Thomas (American politician) (1898–1966), American politician
- Albert Reuben Edward Thomas (1908–1983), Australian Roman Catholic bishop
- Albie Thomas (1935–2013), Australian middle- and long-distance runner
- Bep Thomas (Albert Rudolf Thomas, born 1938), Dutch football referee
- Albert Sidney Thomas (1873–1967), bishop of the Episcopal Diocese of South Carolina
- Albert Thomas Walker, Canadian politician from Ontario

== See also ==
- Albert-Félix-Théophile Thomas (1847–1907), French architect
