= The Sun (New Zealand newspaper) =

Defunct newspaper published in Christchurch, Canterbury, New Zealand

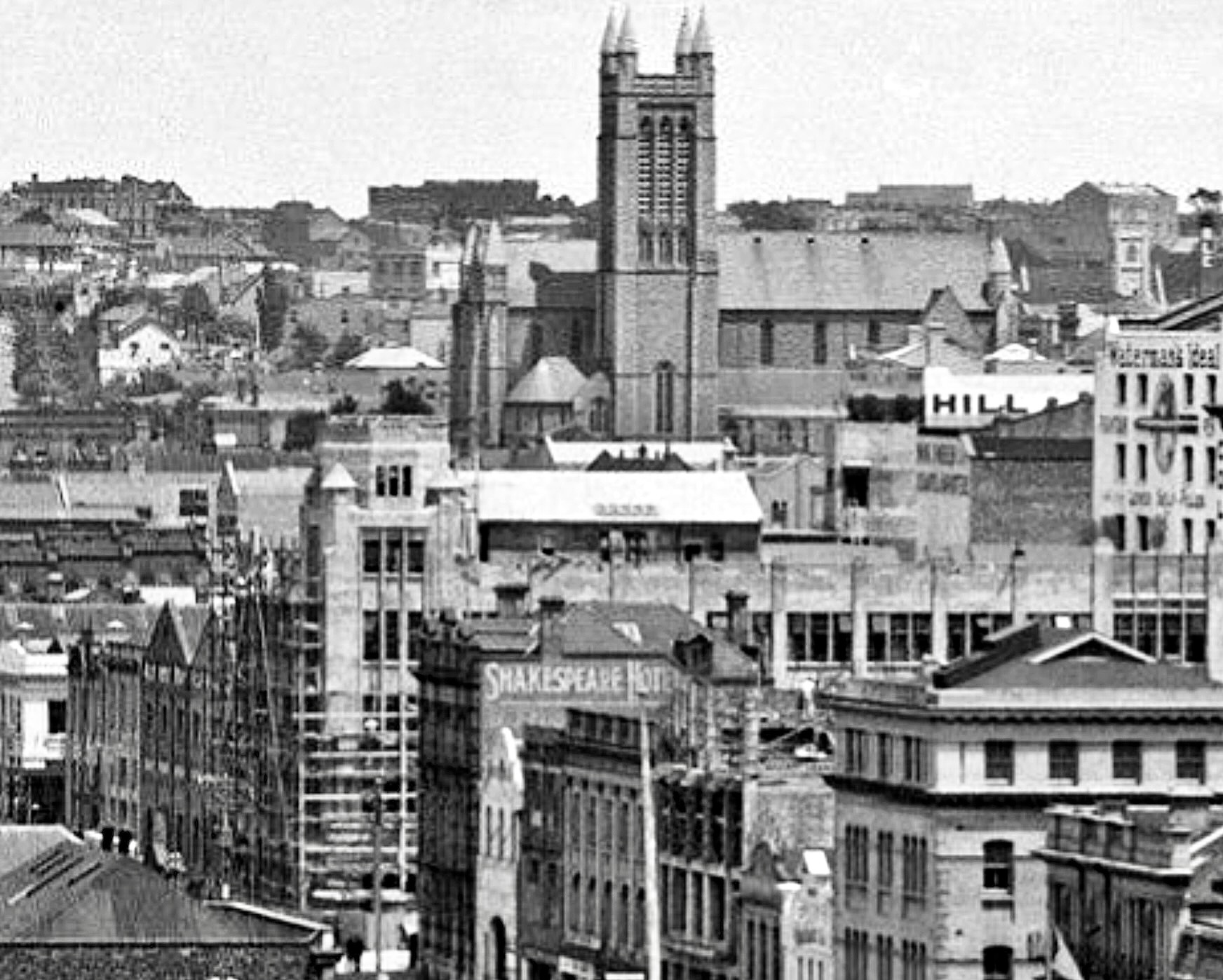
Albert St, Auckland in 1927, showing the Sun building under construction. It was designed by Chilwell & Trevithick

The Sun was a newspaper published in Christchurch, Canterbury, New Zealand. In 1934 it had 105 staff at its offices at 87 Worcester Street.

From 1927 to 1930 it also produced a Sun newspaper in Auckland. Unlike the other Auckland papers it had news on the front page.

Its steel and concrete Auckland print and office building was at 63 Albert Street, on the corner of Wyndham Street, which had been the site of the Clanricarde Hotel. Around 1980 it was replaced by a 15-floor block.

== History ==
The newspaper began publication in February 1914. It was published until July 1935, when it merged with its competitor, The Star, and continued as the Christchurch Star-Sun. The name was simplified to The Christchurch Star in 1958, and publication of the daily ceased in 1991. The Star later reappeared, first twice-weekly and then as a weekly community newspaper.

The Sun's founder, Edward C Huie, was editor of Christchurch's Evening News until 1912. Then the Canterbury Publishing Company was registered with a capital of £75,000 from supporters of the Reform Party. Huie became editor of the new paper, which had more illustrations than other papers of the time. The Evening News suspended publication on 31 May 1917, saying it was due to wartime paper shortages, but the Sun's competition may well have been another factor.

In 1929, the Brett Company, publishers of the Auckland Star, took over the Lyttelton Times. The merged company, New Zealand Newspapers Ltd (NZNL), then owned the other Christchurch evening papers. It bought the Auckland Sun in 1930. In a November 1934 price war, all the Christchurch papers reduced their price to a penny. New Zealand Newspapers agreed to buy the Sun on 5 June 1935. As the evening daily, Christchurch Star-Sun it was published from 1 July 1935 to 1958, becoming the Christchurch Star until it closed in 1991.
