= Bert Thomas =

British political cartoonist

Bert Thomas MBE
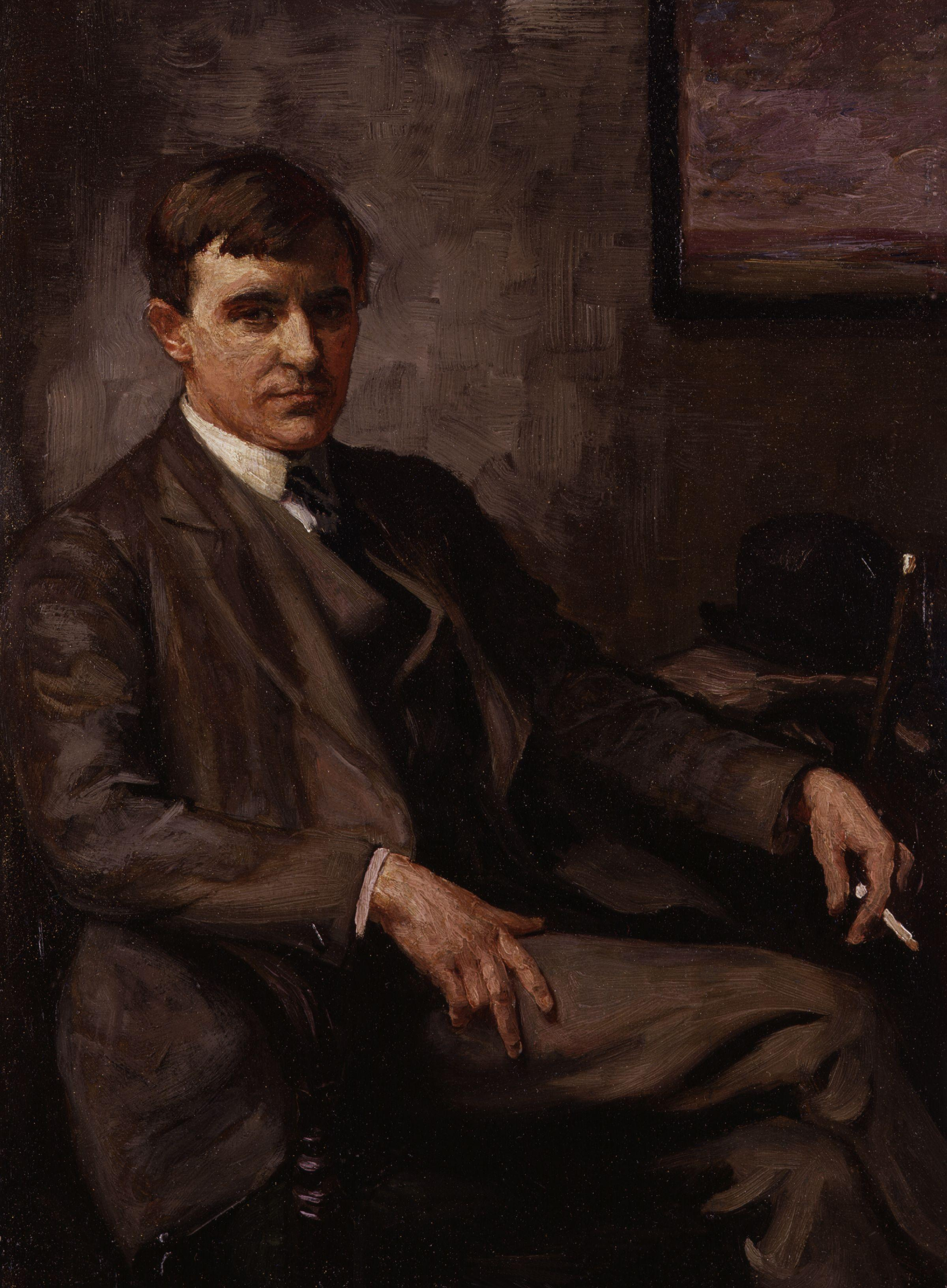
- Portrait (undated, artist unknown)
- Born: Herbert Samuel Thomas; 13 October 1883; Newport, Monmouthshire, Wales
- Died: 6 September 1966 (aged 82); London, England
- Resting place: Kensal Green Cemetery, London, England
- Occupation: Political cartoonist
- Known for: Work for Punch magazine; Wartime propaganda posters
- Spouse: Elizabeth Florette Bowen
- Children: 6
- Awards: MBE

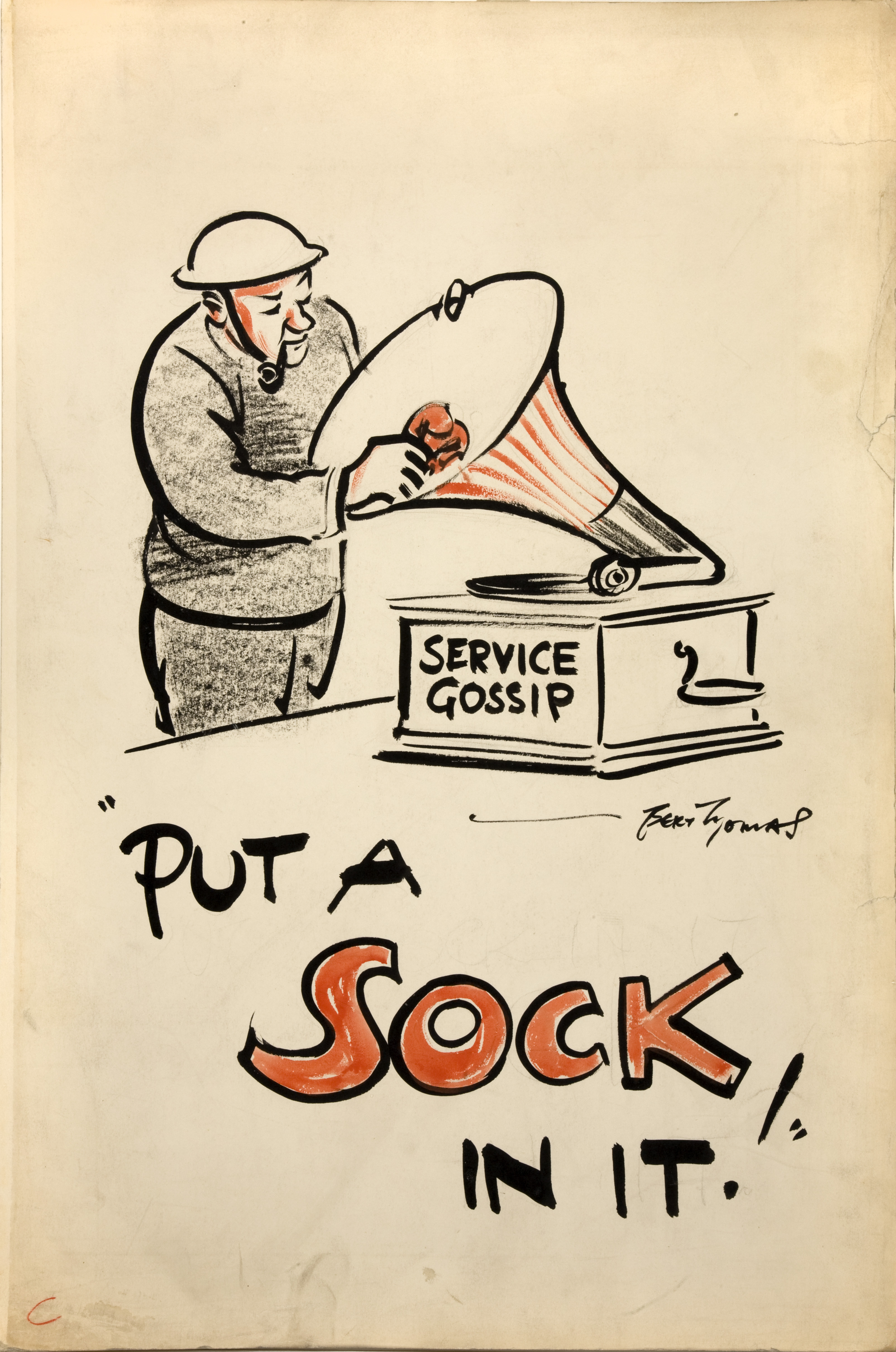
Thomas' cartoon for the Ministry of Information during the Second World War

Herbert Samuel Thomas MBE (13 October 1883 – 6 September 1966) was a British political cartoonist contributing to Punch magazine and the creator of well-known British propaganda posters during the First and Second World Wars.

== Career ==
Thomas joined Punch in 1905 and contributed until 1935. During the First World War he was in the Artists Rifles.

Thomas' political cartoons started to be included in gallery exhibitions as artistic caricatures as early as 1913, in an exhibition on the Strand by the Society of Humorous Art and in 1916 his cartoon against the Clyde strikers with the Kaiser saying "pass friend" to a striker was a featured exhibit in an exhibition of war cartoons in the Graves Galleries on Pall Mall.

In 1918 he became nationally known for his cartoon "Arf a mo, Kaiser", drawn in ten minutes for the Smokes for Tommy Weekly Dispatch campaign. The cartoon raised nearly a quarter of a million pounds towards "comforts" (tobacco and cigarettes) for front line troops and the image was re-drawn and used during the Second World War with the caption "Arf a mo, 'itler". The Germans banned the "Arf a mo, 'itler" cartoon and to ensure British prisoners did not have their comfort parcels confiscated, he created a variation with the caption "Are we downhearted?"

He was made MBE in the 1918 Birthday Honours.

== Personal life ==
Thomas married Elizabeth Florette Bowen (1887/8–1949) on 7 October 1909. They had four sons and two daughters. His son Peter also drew cartoons for Punch.

Thomas died at his home at 33 Inverness Terrace, Bayswater, London, on 6 September 1966, from a stroke. He was buried at Kensal Green Cemetery, London.

The sculptor Ivor Thomas (1873–1913) was his brother.

== Bibliography ==
- Thomas, Bert (1936). Cartoons and Character Drawing. OCLC 503806609.
