= Katwijk aan Zee =

- Town
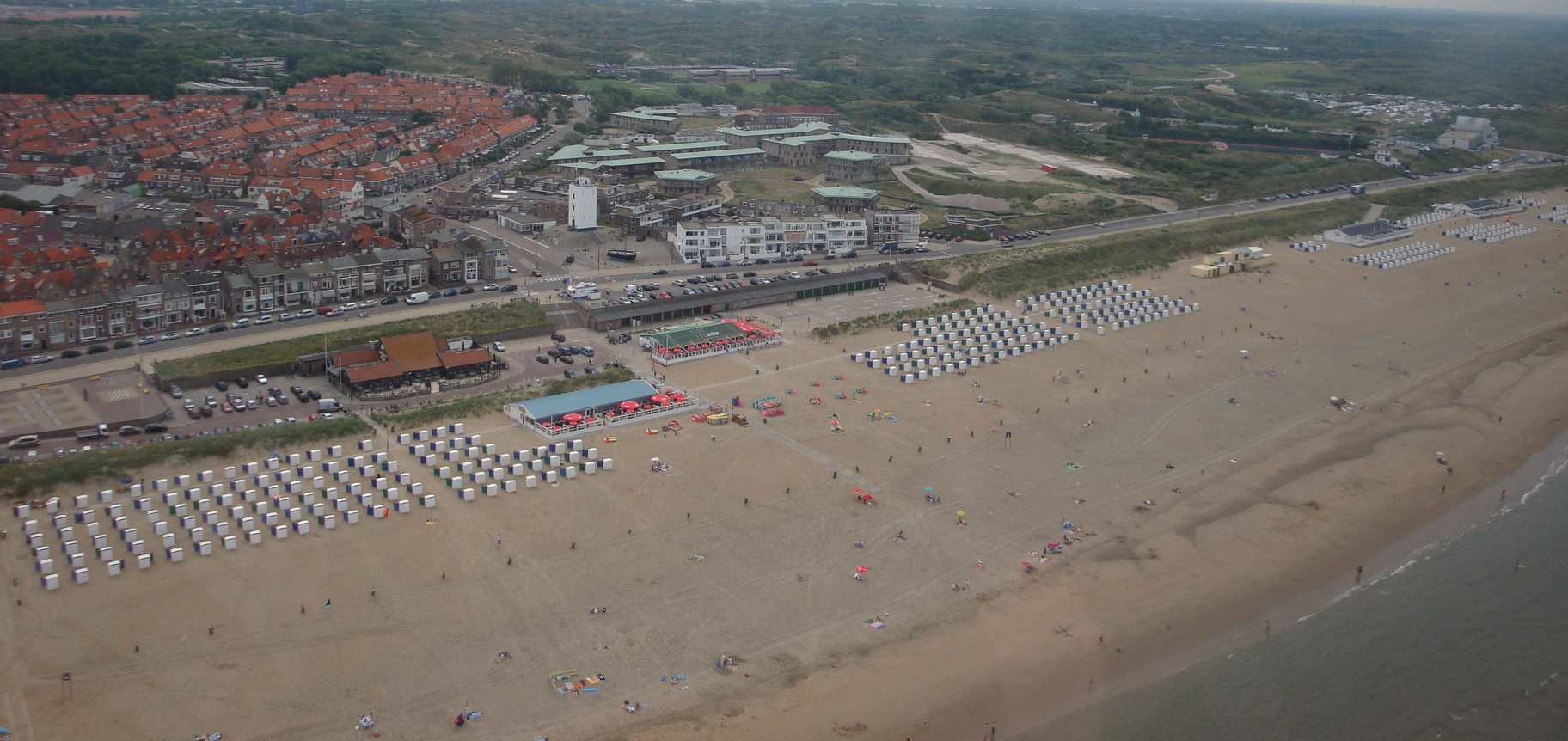
- Aerial view

- Location in the province of South Holland in the Netherlands Location in the Netherlands
- Coordinates: 52°12′11″N 4°23′43″E
- Country: Netherlands
- Province: South Holland
- Municipality: Katwijk

Area
  - Total: 2.60 km^{2} (1.00 sq mi)
- Elevation: 11.3 m (37 ft)

Population (2021)
  - Total: 17,755
  - Density: 6,830/km^{2} (17,700/sq mi)
- Time zone: UTC+1 (CET)
  - Summer (DST): UTC+2 (CEST)
- Postal code: 2224 & 2225
- Dialing code: 071

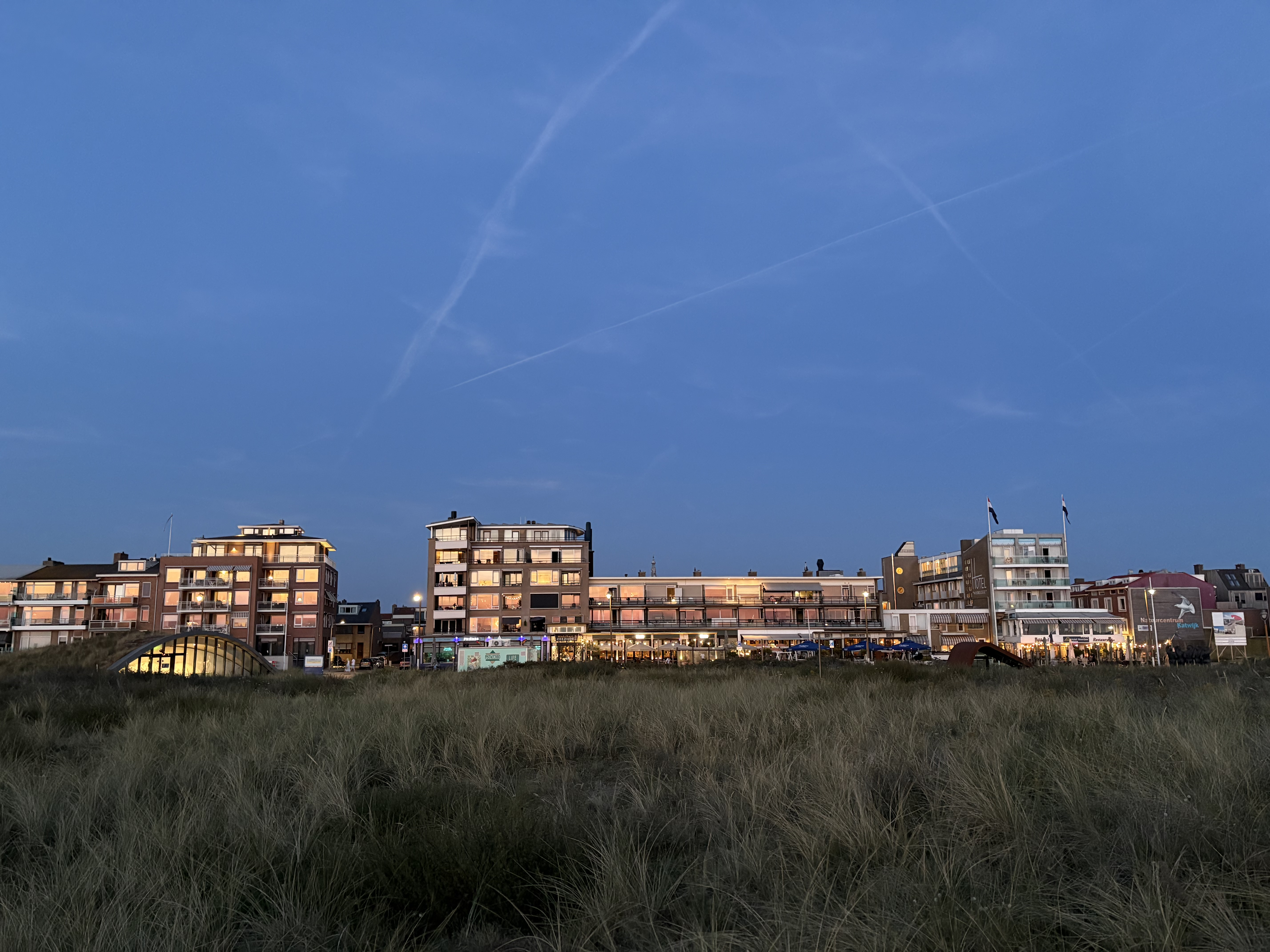
Beachfront of Katwijk aan Zee

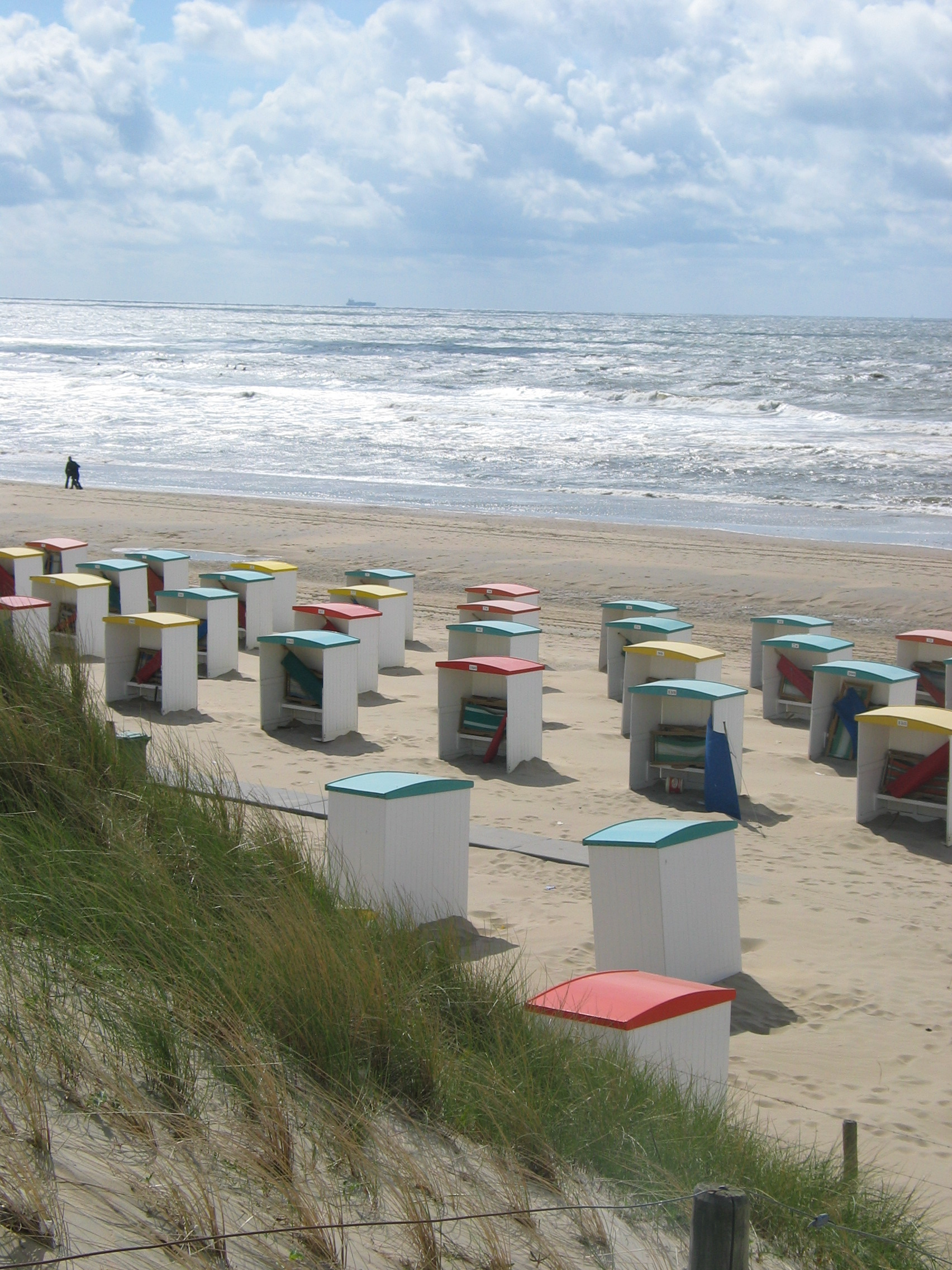
Beach at Katwijk aan Zee

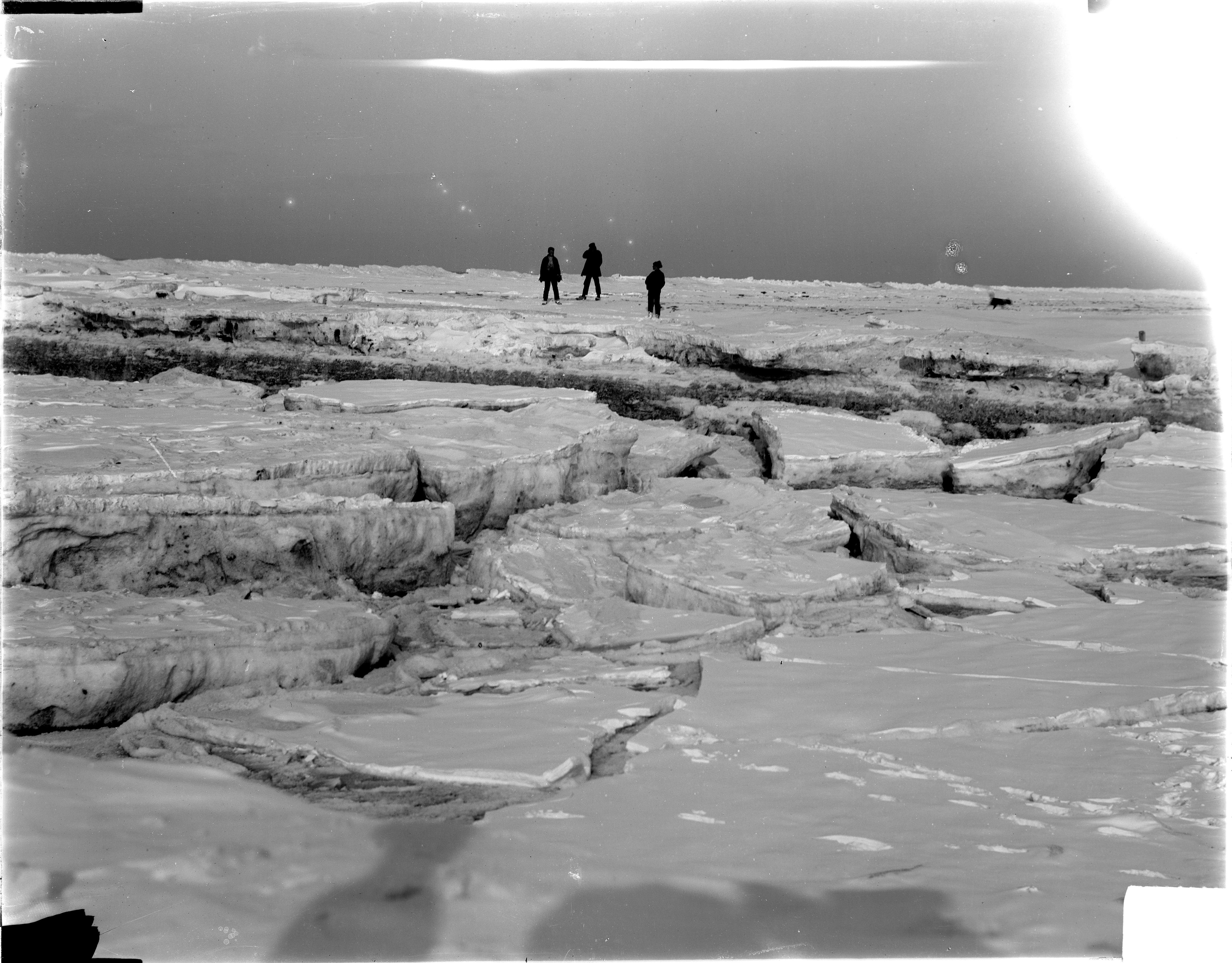
Frozen sea at the beach of Katwijk, 1898. Picture by Jan Goedeljee.

Katwijk aan Zee (literally, Katwijk-on-Sea) is a seaside resort located on the North Sea at the mouth of the Oude Rijn. It is situated in the municipality of Katwijk and the province of South Holland.

== History ==
=== The Origin till the Golden age of the Netherlands ===
The name "Katwijk" probably has its origins in the name of a Germanic tribe called the Chatten (Chatti). The Dutch word "wijk" means "area", so the name probably meant something like "the Chatti area".

In Roman times, Katwijk was a place of strategic importance. It was located at the Roman Empire's northern border, at the mouth of the Rhine river, which in Roman times was larger in this area than it is today. There was a good deal of traffic along the Rhine. Katwijk was also a jumping-off point for the voyage to Britain. Built during the reign of Emperor Claudius (41–54), the town's name was Lugudunum. The town's name was later associated with the name of the city of Leiden, but this is now thought to be incorrect.

After the Romans left the settlement was abandoned and the area largely depopulated, except for small, isolated groups of Frisians ekeing out a living along the changing coast. The area was Christianised by British and Irish missionaries around the 9th century.

Starting around the 12th century the population began to grow. In 1231, the first reference to Catwijck appeared in the records. At this time Katwijk aan Zee was little more than a few wooden houses.

A reference to a fish market on the beach appeared in the records around 150 years later. In 1388, the fish market was moved from Katwijk aan den Rijn to Katwijk aan Zee. Katwijk aan Zee and Katwijk aan den Rijn were part of the same heerlijkheid called "Beide de Katwijken en 't Zand" (or something similar). They have been administratively joined for centuries.

In 1520 a Roman ruin known as Brittenburg emerged from the shifting sands on the beach just south of the mouth of the Oude Rijn, much to everyone's astonishment. It became the subject of a number of prints and paintings. It was square in shape, each side measuring 75 m, and the ruins stood about 3 m high. Eventually it disappeared back under the shifting sands. Attempts have been made to find it again, but to no avail.

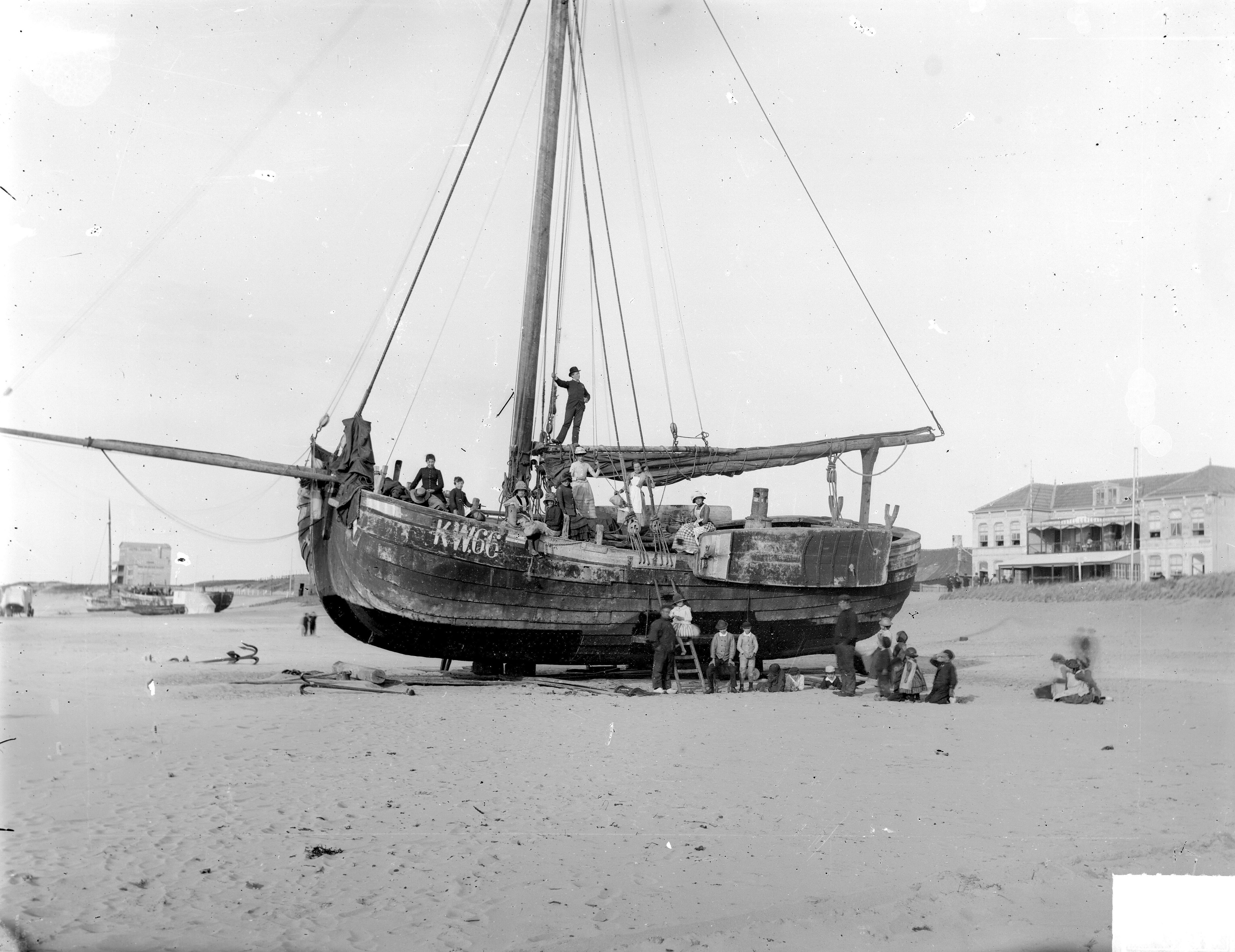
Ship at the beach of Katwijk, ca. 1900. Picture by Jan Goedeljee.

=== From the 17th Century until today ===
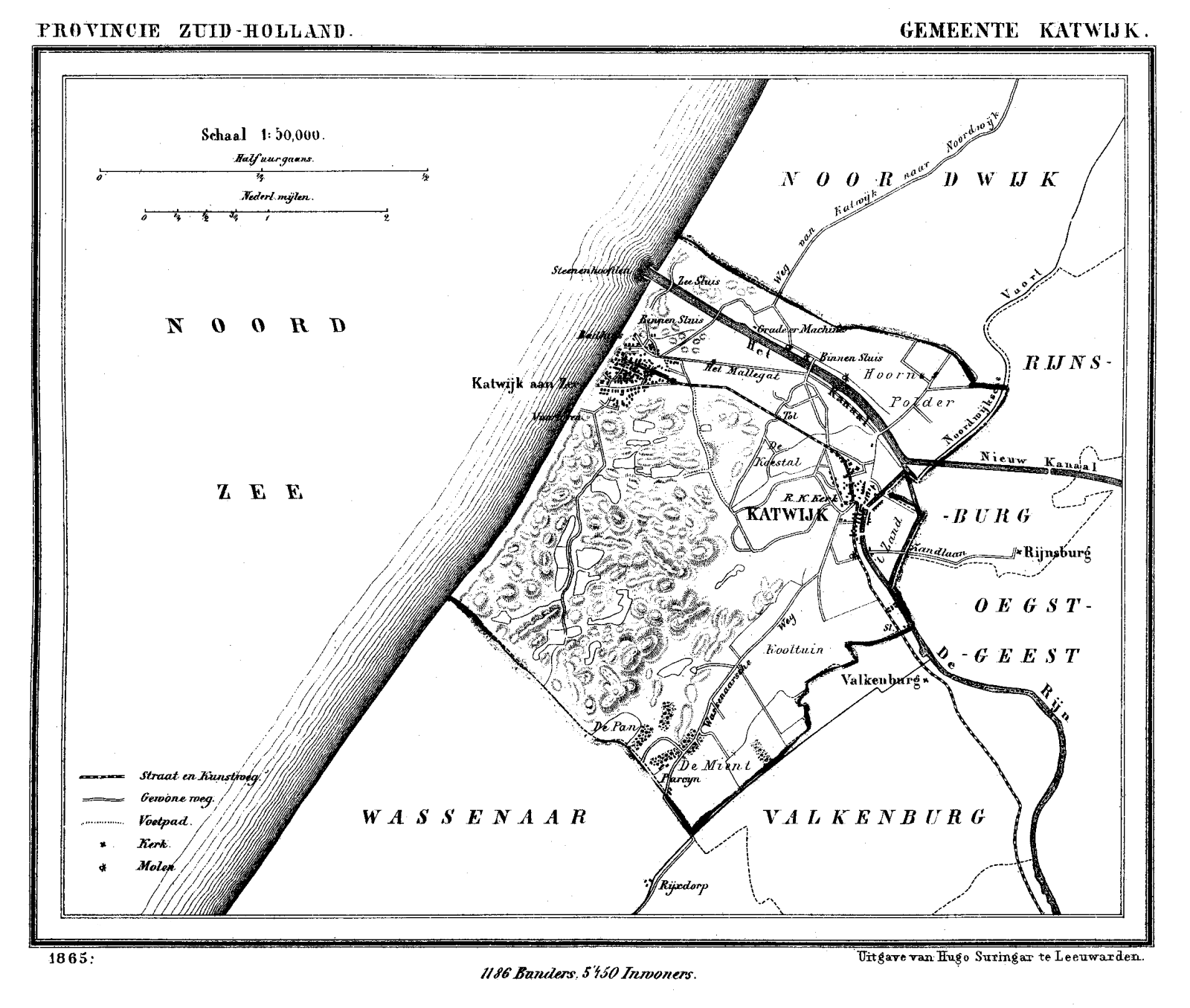
Map of Katwijk at the river Rijn and Katwijk aan Zee, 1865.

The differences with neighbouring communities and the non-migratory nature of members of the old Katwijk families, Katwijk aan Zee continued its existence as a quiet, close-knit North Sea fishing village from the 16th century.

Although fishing is not a major activity in the village today and many of the inhabitants are nowadays secular, the old traditions still survive in many ways. Most of the inhabitants are still very traditional, whether they are member of a Calvinist church or not.

Katwijk aan Zee had its own unique dialect, called 'Katwijks' or 'Strand-Hollands' ('Kattuks' in dialect). This dialect is still spoken by a considerable number of people, therefore being one of the few active dialects of Hollandic still in active use. Yet, fewer youngsters learn to speak the dialect actively.

Over the course of time the mouth of the Oude Rijn silted up. However, a locks was constructed at the mouth of the river in 1807 by engineer F. W. Conrad (d. 1808). After this the Old Rhine (here called the Uitwateringskanaal) did not flow naturally into the sea, but was held back by a lock. When necessary, the lock can be opened to allow the river to flow out to sea. The shore and the entrance to the canal were also strengthened by dikes

During World War II, most of the buildings of Katwijk aan Zee were demolished by the Germans to make way for the Atlantic Wall. In the dunes south of Katwijk, many bunkers from World War II can still be found.

Since the 20th century, Katwijk aan Zee is a popular seaside resorts and the village grew explosively. In 1980–1990, Katwijk aan den Rijn and Hoornes-Rijnsoever became incorporated. Recently, in 2006, the neighbouring communities Valkenburg and Rijnsburg were added, which made a larger municipality called 'Katwijk'.

== The artist colony Katwijk School ==
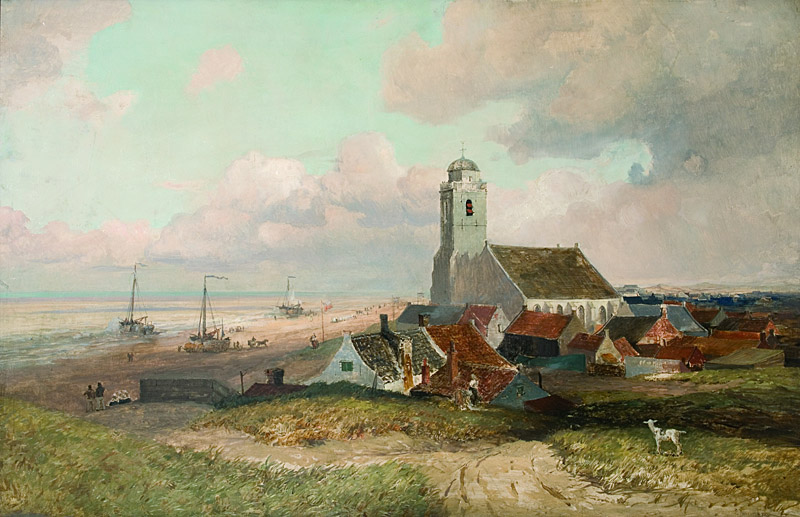
Emil Neumann (1884): Gezicht op Katwijk, Katwijk Museum.

The first known picture was from the famous Haalem painter Jacob van Ruisdael, its title is The view of the tower of Katwijk. This proves, since the time of the Dutch Golden Age was Katwijk subject of landscape painting.

In the period from 1870 to 1914 existed at Katwijk an artist's colony — the Katwijk School. It is part of the international movement of the impressionism and belongs to the Hague School.

Thereform the Katwijks Museum has arisen. It has a permanent exhibition of the former life of Katwijk aan Zee and annually changing art exhibitions - the themes are the time of the impressionism and the artists who had worked at Katwijk aan Zee. There are such famous artists like David Adolphe Constant Artz, Bernard Blommers, Eugéne Dücker, Thomas Bush Hardy, Jozef Israëls, Johannes Hermanus Koekkoek, Max Liebermann, Jan Toorop and Jan Hillebrand Wijsmuller.

== Other facts ==
Katwijk aan Zee is the landing place for a large number of international and intercontinental Transatlantic telephone cables such as the TAT-14.

Katwijk aan Zee is the home town of Netherlands forward Dirk Kuyt, a retired professional football player who has played for FC Utrecht, Feyenoord, Liverpool F.C. and Fenerbahçe S.K. and the Netherlands national football team. He started and ended his senior career with local team Quick Boys, playing for them in 1998 and 2018.

== Biography ==
- M. Vooijs, Ds. J. Blom en G.D. van Kruistum: Vissen in de oude kerk is een uitgave van de Nederlandse Hervormde Gemeente te Katwijk aan Zee, ISBN 90-90-16162-7.
- Balen-Chavannes, A.E. van (1972): Bibliographie van de Geschiedenis van Zuid-Holland tot 1966, Publisher Culturele Raad van Zuid-Holland, Delft.
- Hucht, J. van der (1969): Bibliographie en iconographie van beide Katwijken en't Zand, Publisher Katwijk, Katwijk.
- John Silveris, J. P. van Brakel, R. Siebelhoff: Katwijk in de Schilderkunst. Museum Katwijk, 1995, ISBN 90-800304-4-9.
- Norma Broude: Impressionismus – eine Internationale Bewegung 1860–1920. Dumond Buchverlag, Köln 1990, ISBN 3-8321-7454-0.
- John Sillevis, Hans Kraan, Roland Dorn: Die Haager Schule, Meisterwerke der Holländischen Malerei des 19. Jahrhunderts aus Haags Gemeentemuseum. Ausst.-Katalog. Kunsthalle Mannheim, Edition Braus, 1987, ISBN 3-925835-08-3.
- Frouke van Dijke, Maartje van den Heuvel, Dik van der Meulen, Michiel Purmer: Holland op z'n mooist – op pad met de Haagse School. Ausstellungskatalog des Gemeentemuseums und Dordrechtmuseums. Uitgeverij WBooks, 2015, ISBN 978-94-6258-084-8.
- Sheila D. Muller: Dutch Art. An Encyclopedia. Routledge Verlag, London 1997, ISBN 0-8153-0065-4.
- Walther Bernt: Die Niederländischen Maler und Zeichner des 17. Jahrhunderts. Bruckmann Verlag, München 1979, ISBN 3-7654-1768-8 (Gesamtausgabe).
- E. W. Petrejus: De bomschuit : een verdwenen scheepstype. (= Museum voor Land- en Volkerkunde en het Maritiern Museum "Prins Hendrik". Nr. 2). Rotterdam 1954, OCLC 23088615.
- Kees Stal: De storm van 1894, de ramp die Scheveningen een nieuw gezicht gaf. Museum Scheveningen, 1994, ISBN 90-389-0282-4.

== Photographs ==
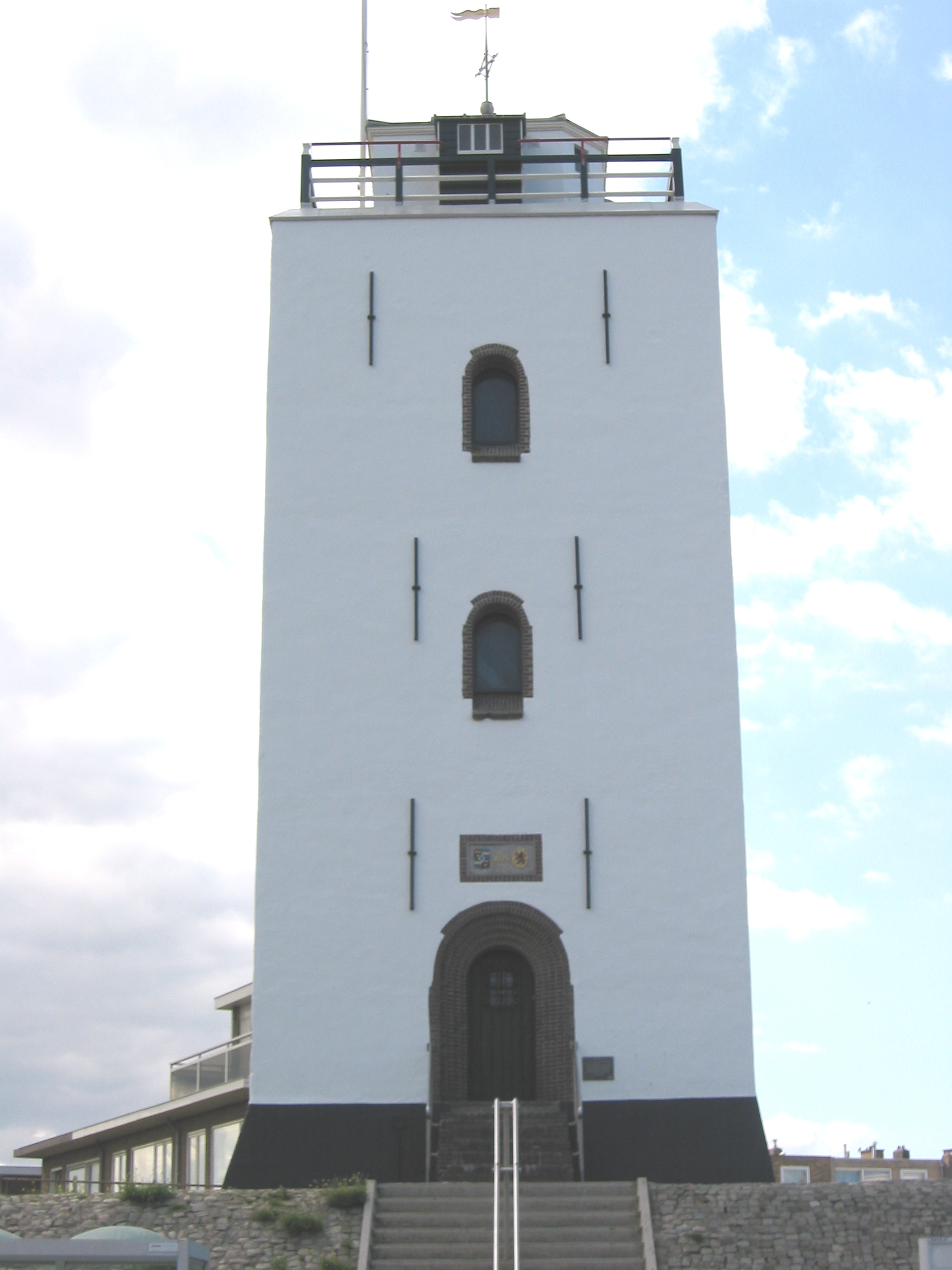
The lighthouse Vuurbaak van Katwijk aan Zee.

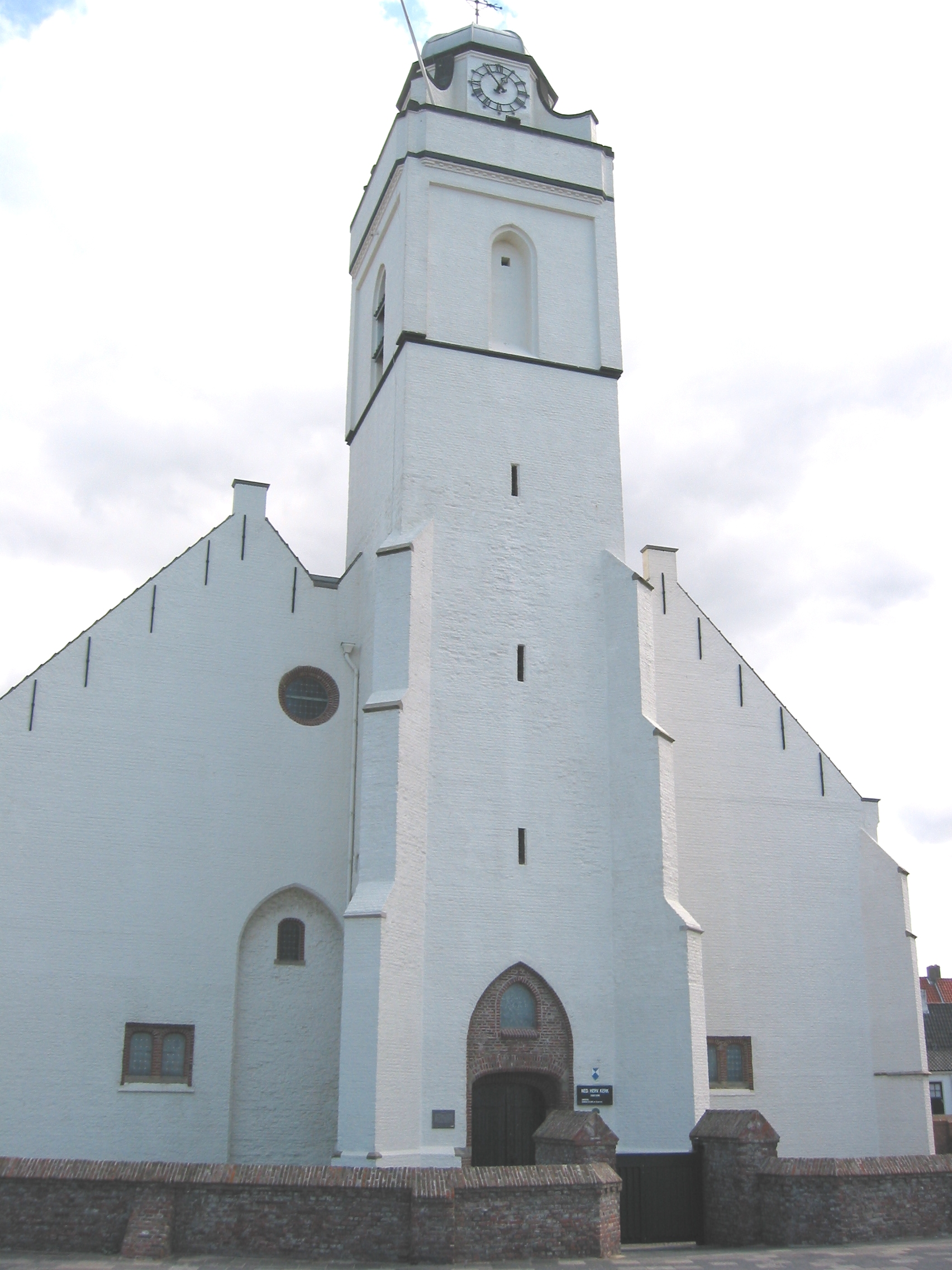
The White Church (de Witte kerk / Andreaskerk) at Katwijk aan Zee.

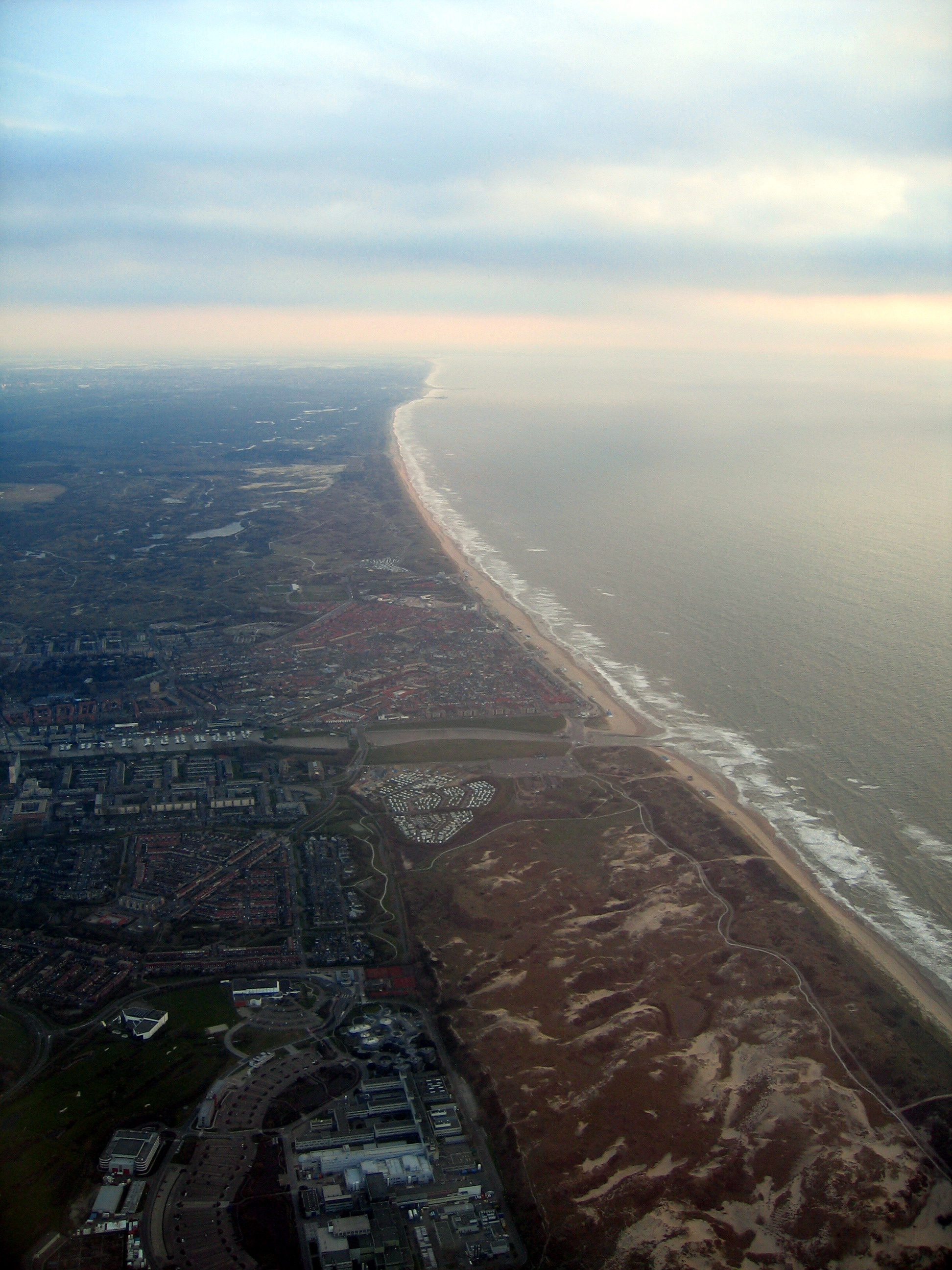
Katwijk aan Zee.

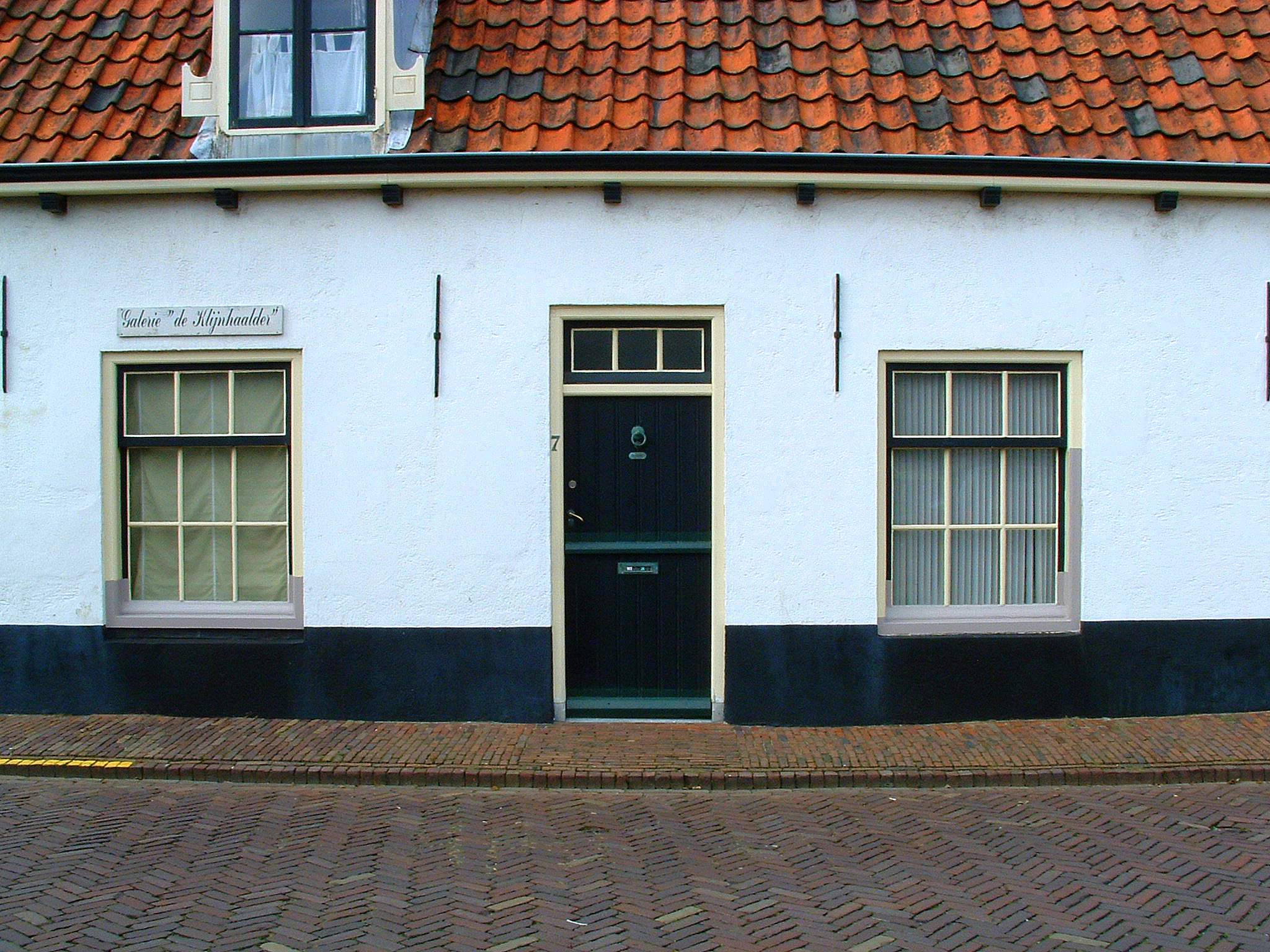
"Galerie de Klijnhaalder"

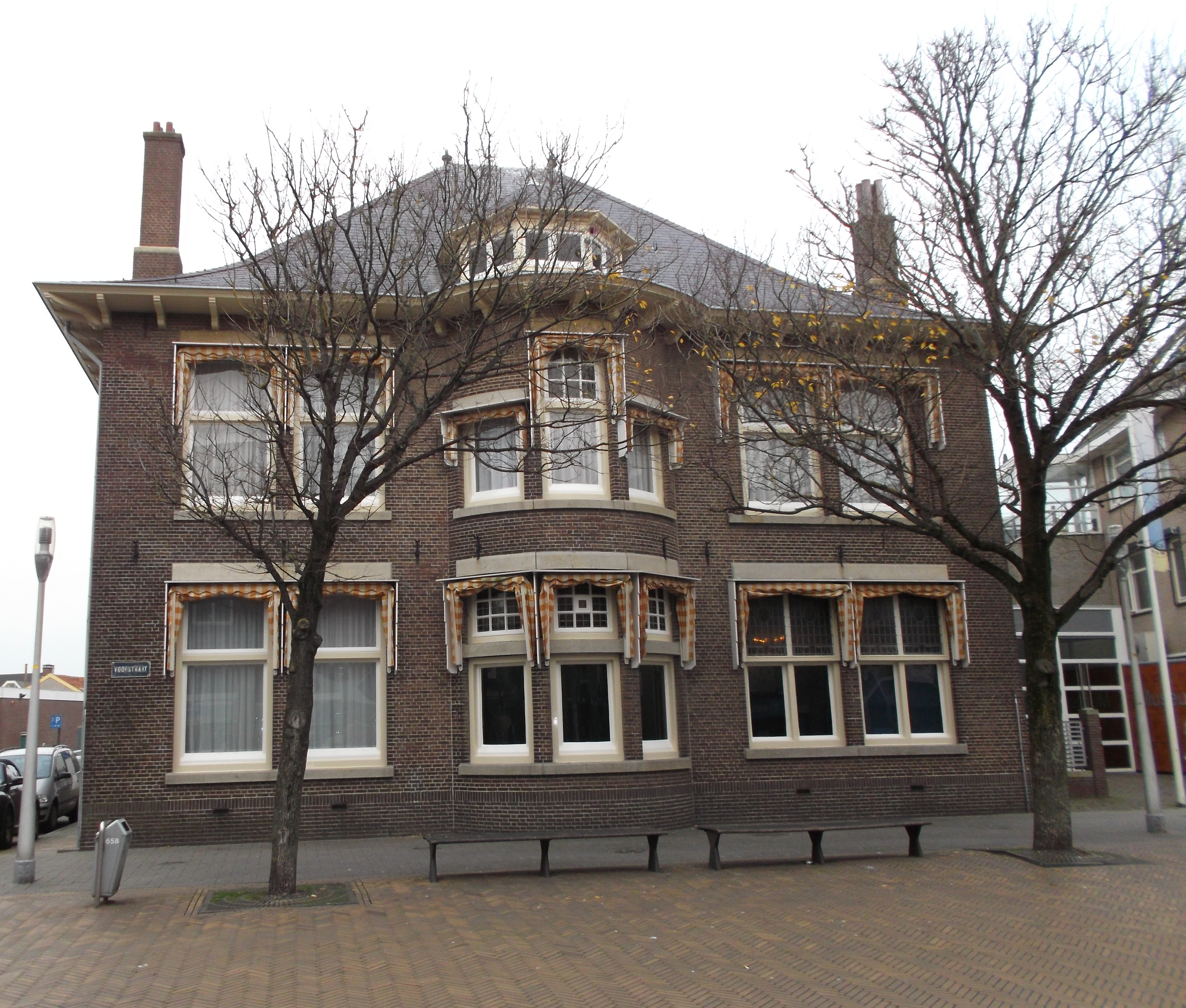
Katwijks Museum

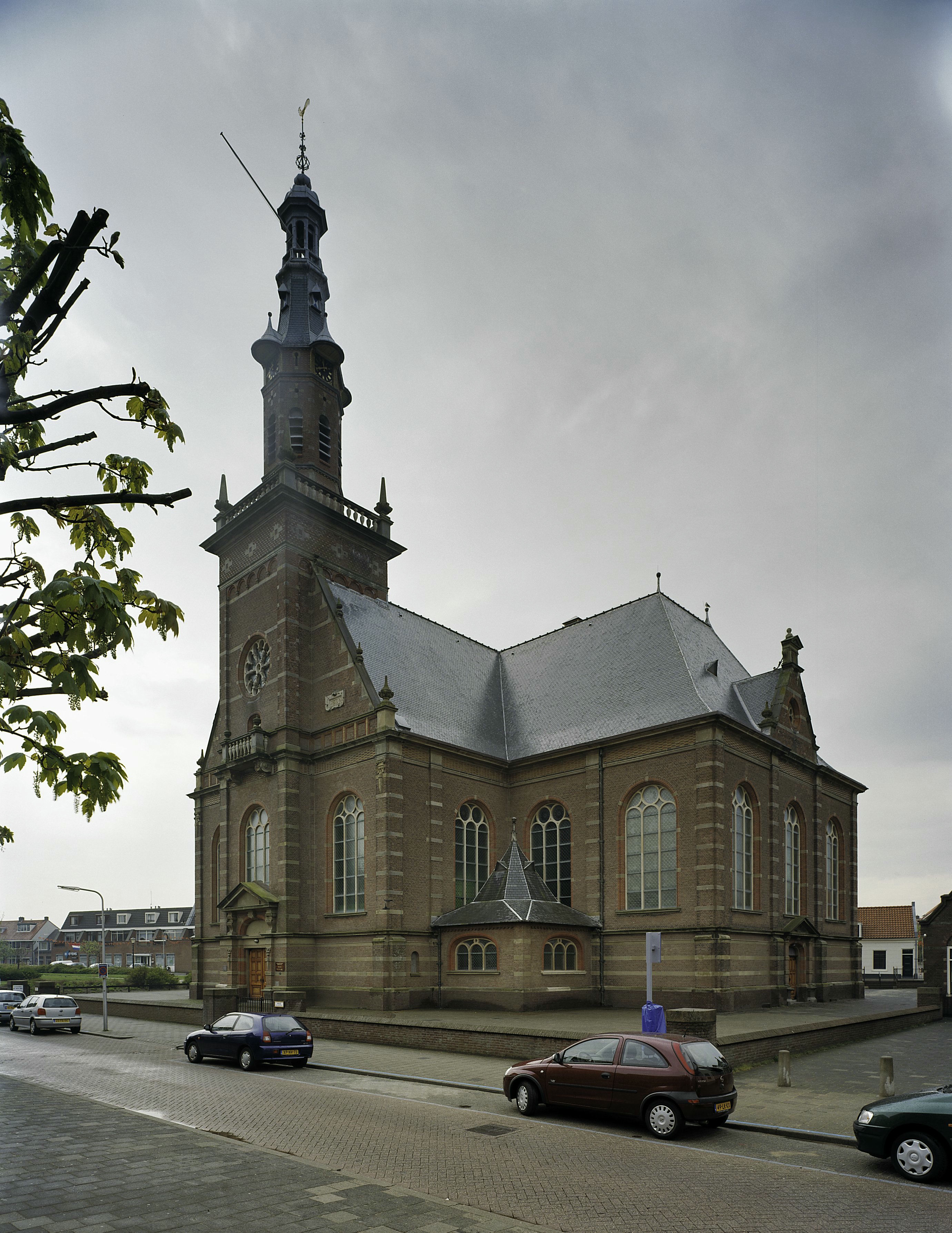
The new church of Katwijk.
