= Vuurbaak van Katwijk aan Zee =

Lighthouse in the Netherlands

Vuurbaak Katwijk
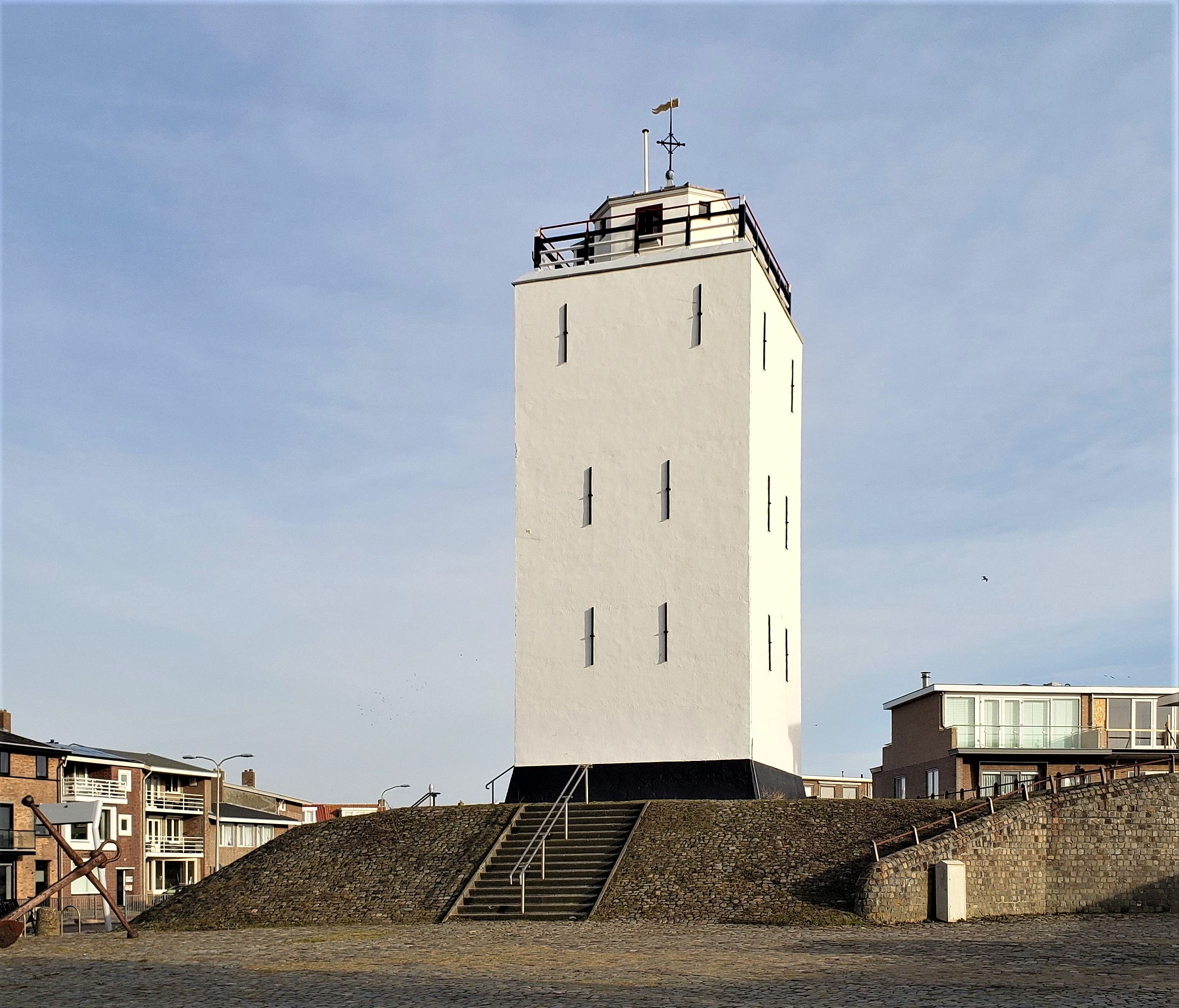
- Vuurbaak in 2023
- Location: Katwijk aan Zee, Katwijk, Netherlands
- Coordinates: 52°12′01″N 4°23′27″E

Tower
- Constructed: 1605
- Construction: brick
- Height: 12 m (39 ft)
- Shape: square
- Heritage: Rijksmonument

Light
- Deactivated: 1913

The Vuurbaak van Katwijk aan Zee is a Dutch lighthouse in Katwijk aan Zee, in South Holland, on the North Sea. It is the second oldest lighthouse in the country; only the Brandaris (1594) is older. The lighthouse was essentially just a 12-metre-tall (39 ft) tower on top of which a fire was lit whenever Katwijker fishers were out at sea (they fished for herring off the east coast of England). The fire was replaced with an oil lamp in the mid-19th century; by the early 1900s there were no fishing vessels from Katwijk and the lighthouse became inactive.

== History ==
In the 1500s Katwijk already had a lighthouse, a tower on top of which a fire was built if fishermen from Katwijk (who fished for herring near the English east coast) were out at sea. The All Saints' Flood of 1570 removed a large section of the coastline, which threatened the lighthouse. The current tower was built in 1605, most likely with bricks from the old tower. Initially the maintenance was paid for by a tax on ships that sailed from the local harbor; in 1621 that was changed to a tax on the fish traded locally. The tower's flat roof had an iron basket in which a wood fire (later coal fire) could be lit. In the mid-1800s an oil lamp with reflector was placed on the tower.

Around 1700 Katwijk was again threatened by coastal erosion, and more so than other coastal villages on the North Sea coast for three reasons: the village was close to the sea, the dunes were flat and low, and the shoals were lower than elsewhere. The dunes were fortified in 1702, and to protect the lighthouse (which seemed in imminent danger) a breakwater was built the next year.

The lighthouse was renovated in 1901, and deactivated in 1913, when ships were no longer docking in Katwijk (they went to IJmuiden and Scheveningen). During World War I it functioned as an observation post for the Royal Netherlands Navy and was manned around the clock by three sailors. During World War II the German occupiers placed a machine gun on top. When the Atlantic Wall was built, all the houses near the lighthouse and along the Katwijk boulevard were demolished, but the lighthouse was spared. The lighthouse was fully restored in 1989 and is open for visitors.

== Gallery ==
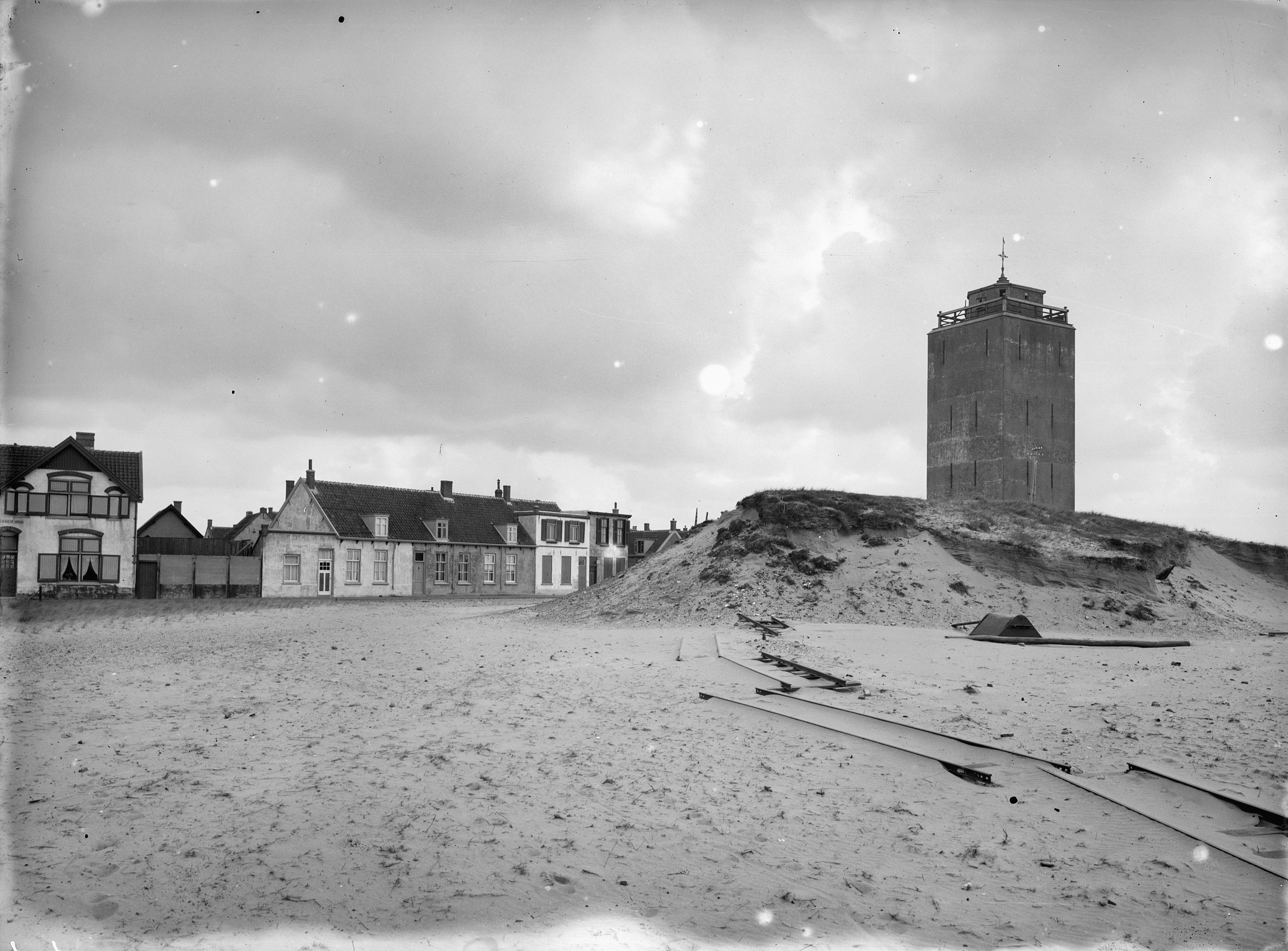
Toward the northeast

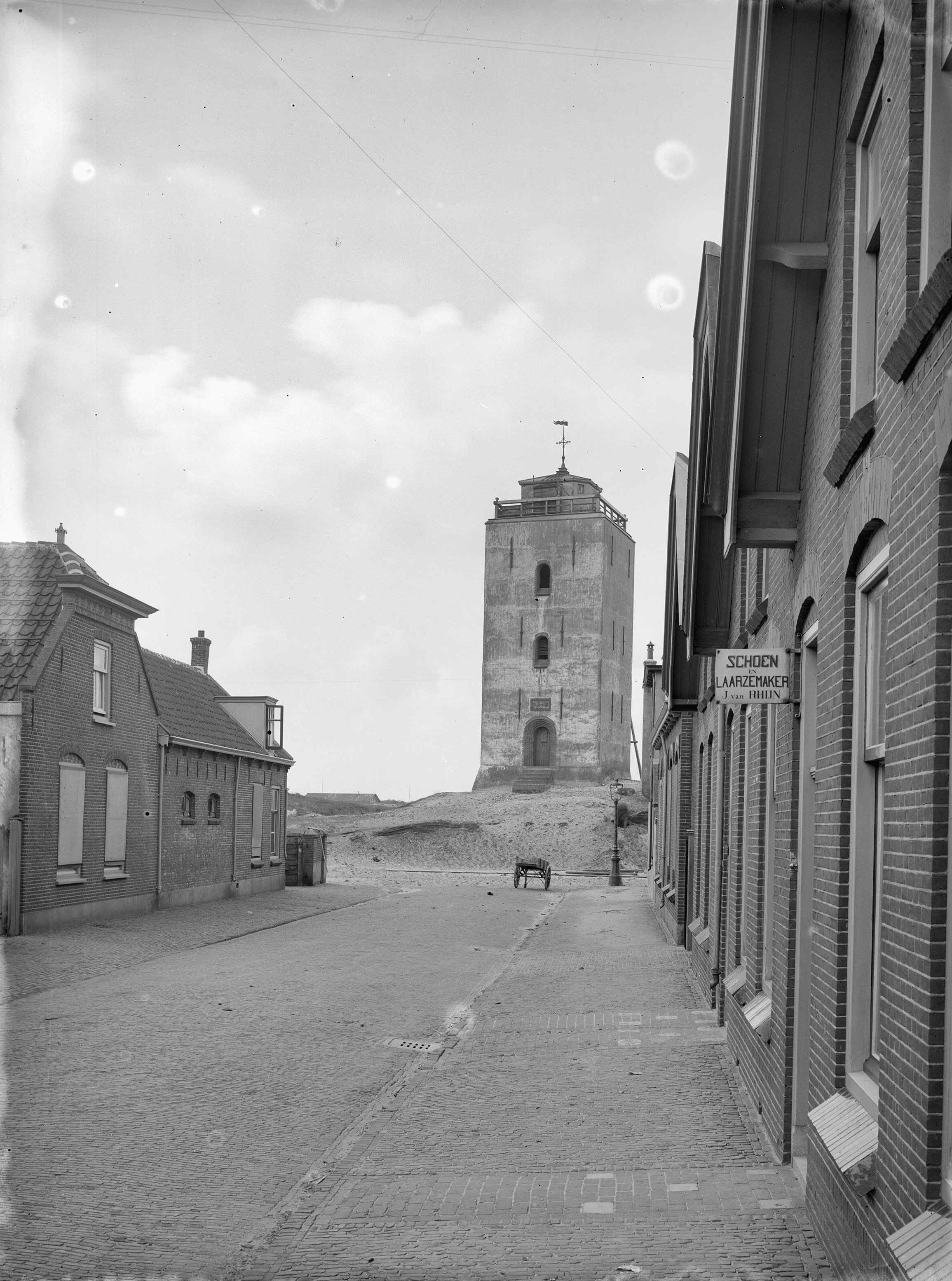
Toward the south

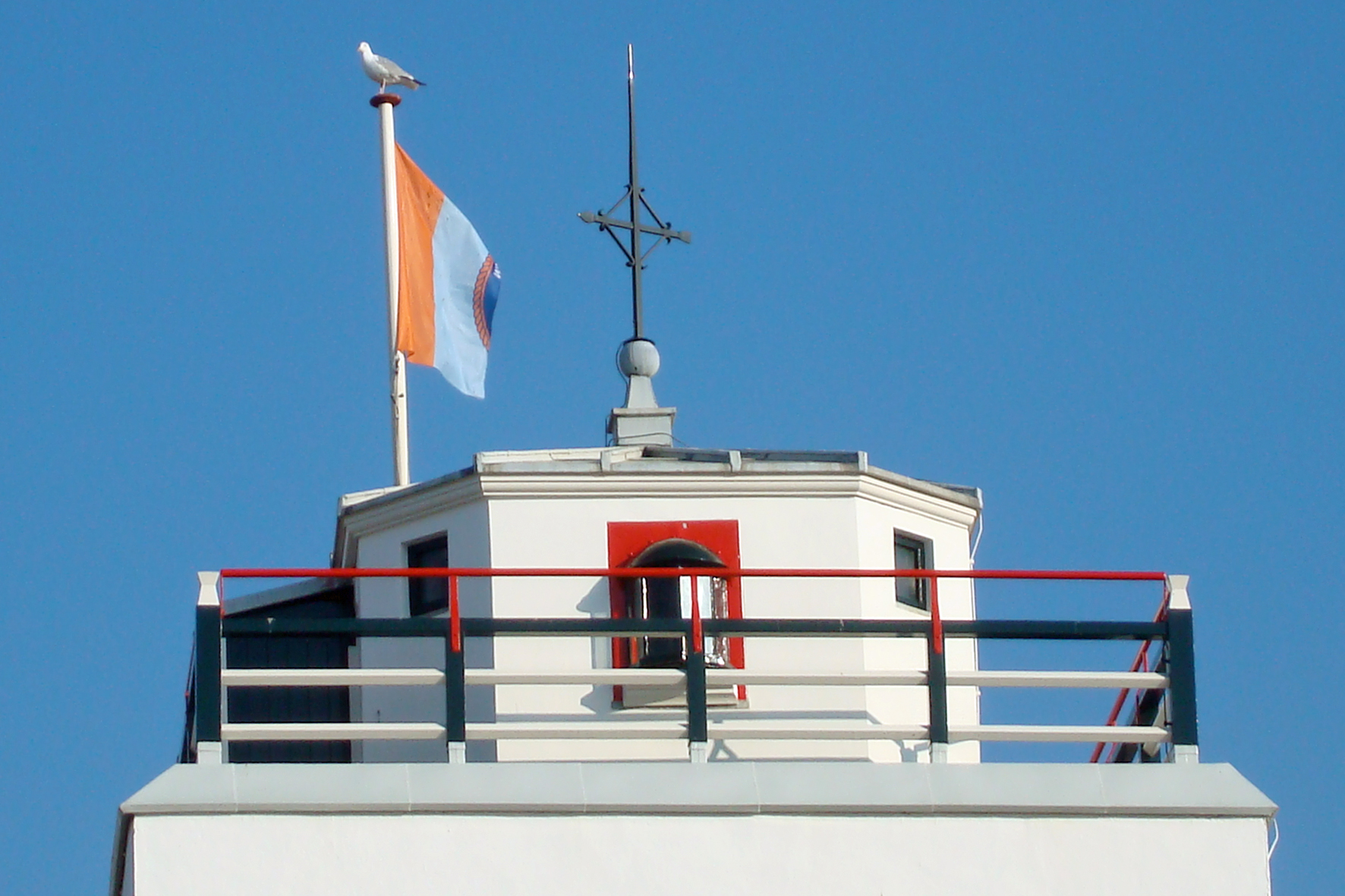
Top of the lighthouse

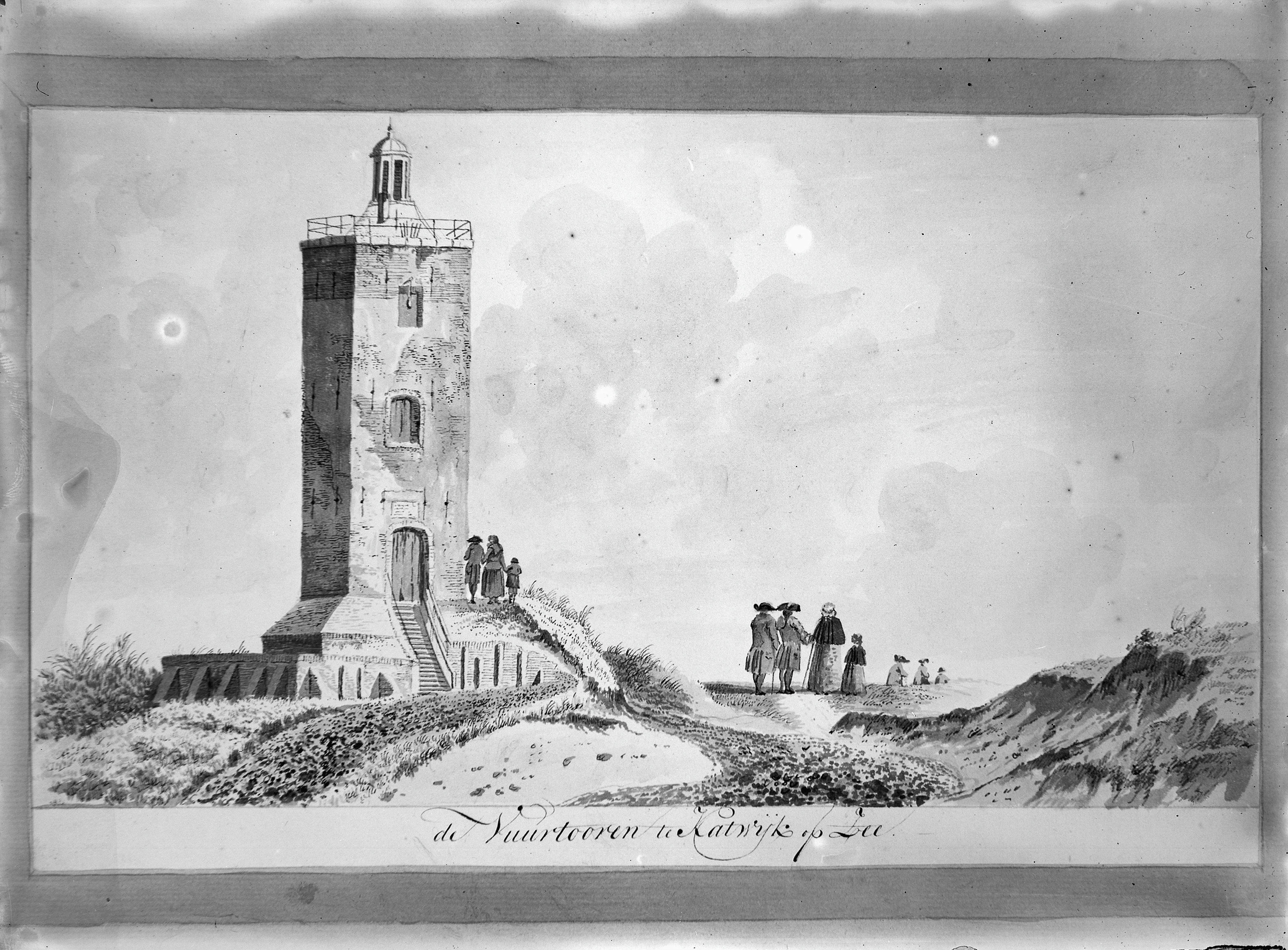
From an 18th-century drawing

== See also ==
- List of lighthouses in the Netherlands
