= Frederick James Aldridge =

British artist (1850-1953)

- Born: 1850
- Died: 1933 (aged 82–83)
- Occupation: Painter

Frederick James Aldridge (1850–1933) was a British marine artist who mainly painted in watercolour and sometimes in oils. He established both a British and international reputation.

The majority of his paintings are marine subjects set around the south coast of England as he lived in Worthing, West Sussex all his life. Often he would sit and paint from the harbours at Shoreham by Sea and Littlehampton. He did travel aboard to paint, his favourite places being Holland, Venice and Egypt. His typical paintings were of boats in rolling waves, billowing sails and in rough waters, where he managed to convey the power and energy of the ocean or, rather more often, in calmer waters or in a tranquil harbour scene. He managed to capture the dynamic relationship between sea, sky and vessels. His work now provides a valuable visual record of marine life, costal scenery and harbours of Victorian and Edwardian Britain.

His work has been described as "somewhat in the manner" of Thomas Bush Hardy, and "generally rather loose in drawing".

== Early life and career ==
He was born in 1850 he did not take up painting until he was twenty years old. He lived and worked in Worthing where he had a gallery shop. It is thought he had some kind of art business in 1876 yet it is unclear if it was at Warwick street, but in 1905 with his son's as partners established the shop at 35 Warwick street, Worthing, West Sussex. Here the shop was used for multi-purpose functions, an art shop, framing art work, art dealership, art restoring and art studio. The shop was called 'The Little Gallery'. In 1925 they opened up a second shop number 4 in the Arcade, Worthing. This had just been opened in that year after the old burnt out hotel was replace by a shopping arcade. The family gallery closed 1965.

A Dutch town called Sliedrecht along the Beneden Merwede river near Dordrecht was the setting for many of his Dutch paintings and because of that he named his house in Richmond Road, Worthing, West Sussex 'Sliedrecht' as seen in the UK census records.

It is thought that Aldridge used a pseudonym of J. Hill to some of his paintings to circumvent restrictive commercial contracts he had signed so allowing him to sell his work in other outlets without violating his agreement. page 74 'watercolour marine artistry whose work is similar style to FJ Aldridge'

Failing eyesight forced him to stop painting in 1927. He died in 1933, aged 83.

== Exhibitions ==
- Royal Academy Of Arts Exhibition, London - 1896 'Mid-Channel' Catalogue No. 1252 (see pictures)
- Royal Academy Of Arts Exhibition, London - 1897 'Sea, ever free' Catalogue No. 1344,
- Royal Academy Of Arts, Exhibition, London - 1901 'Fair wind up channel' Catalogue No. 942
- The Dudley Gallery 32nd Exhibition, London 1896
- The Dudley Gallery Art Society 35th Annual Members' Exhibition of Water Colours, Egyptian Hall, Piccadilly, London 1899. 'Entrance to the public gardens at Venice' Catalogue no.4 (Inspired by Edward William Cooke's painting 1859) (see pictures)
- Eland's Art Gallery Exeter Annual spring exhibition 1906 ‘A grey morning on the Thames’. Exeter. (see pictures)
- Eland's Art Gallery exhibition 1900 multiple watercolours pictures
- Brighton exhibition 1909
- Dorchester Dorset exhibition 1910
- 12 times at Royal Society of British Artists (RBA)
- Several times at Royal Institute of Painters in Watercolour - 1883 x 2 pictures in Exhibition Piccadilly
- 7 times at the Old watercolour Society London
- Several times at the Royal Hibernian Academy in Dublin Ireland
- Several times at Walker Art Gallery Liverpool
- Several times at Goupil Gallery 5 Regent Street London
- Thomas McLean's Gallery exhibition of solo artist July 1902 showing F.J. Aldridge watercolours drawing of marine and river views in England, Holland, Egypt and Italy.

Royal Academy Of Arts exhibition 1896 Mid-Channel cat.1252 with providence

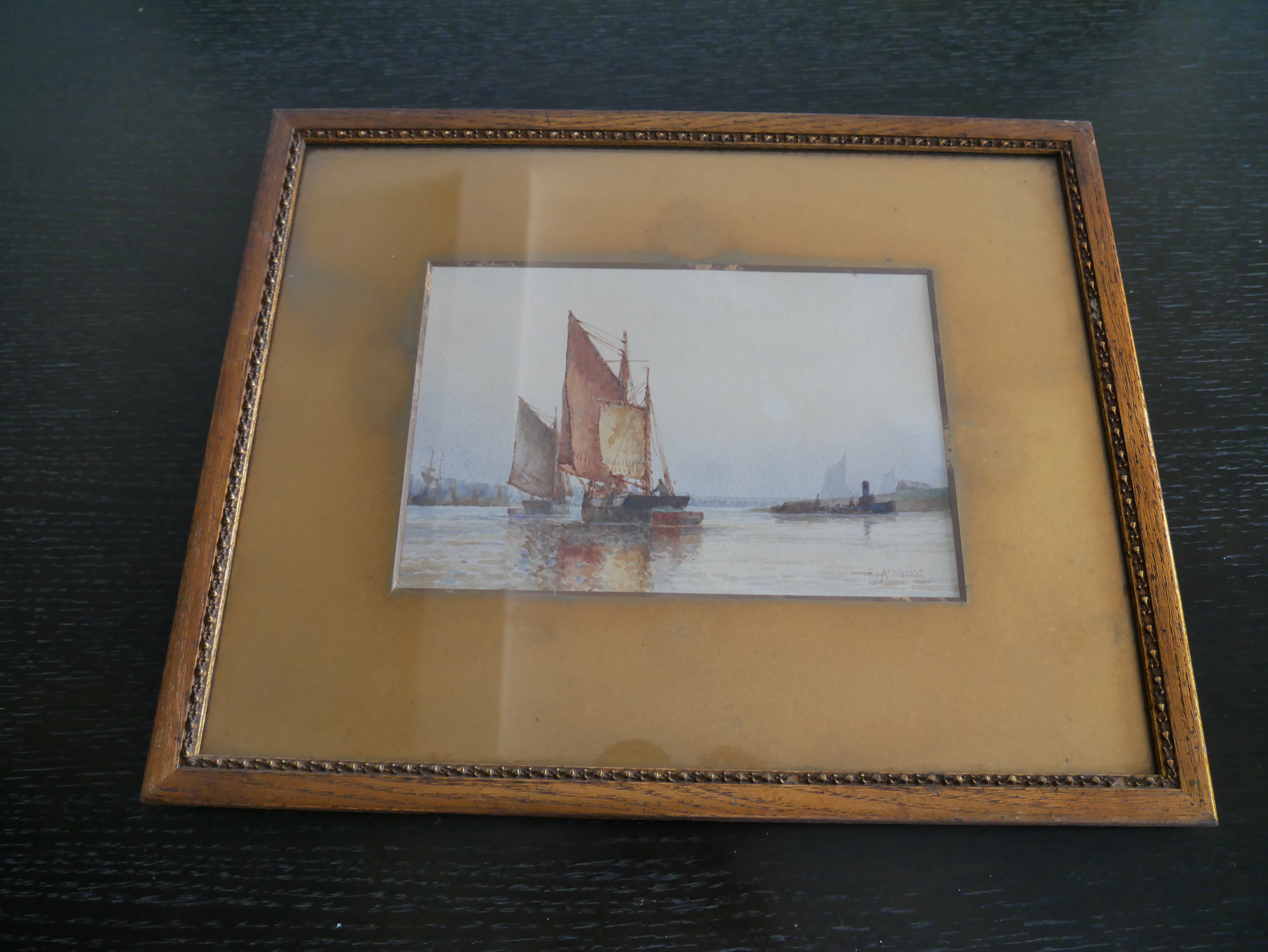
'A Grey Morning on the Thames' 1906 Exeter Elands Annual Spring Exhibition

Dudley Gallery 35th 1899 Exhibition 'Entrance to the public gardens at Venice'

Signatures

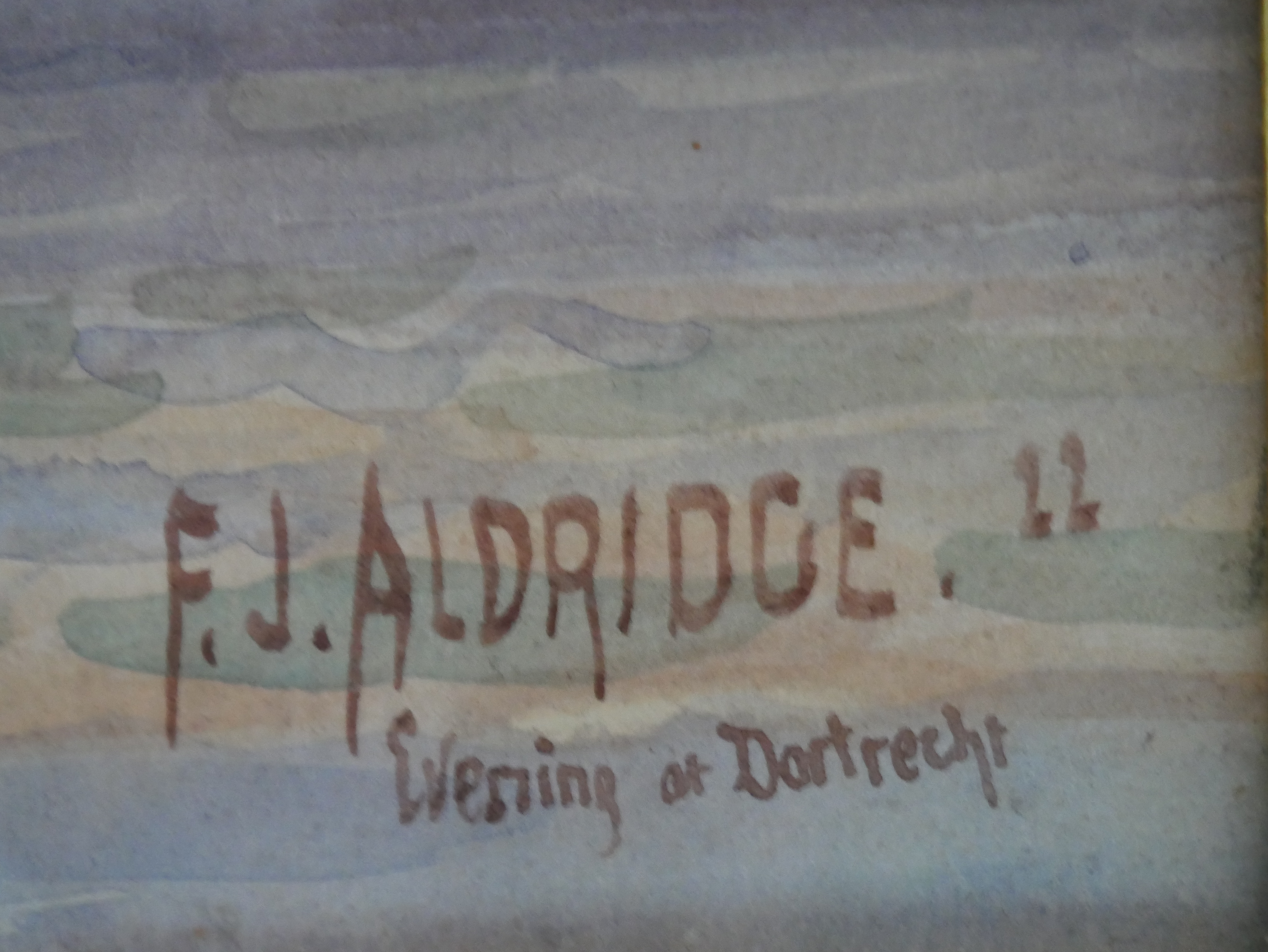
Common signature form with date / place

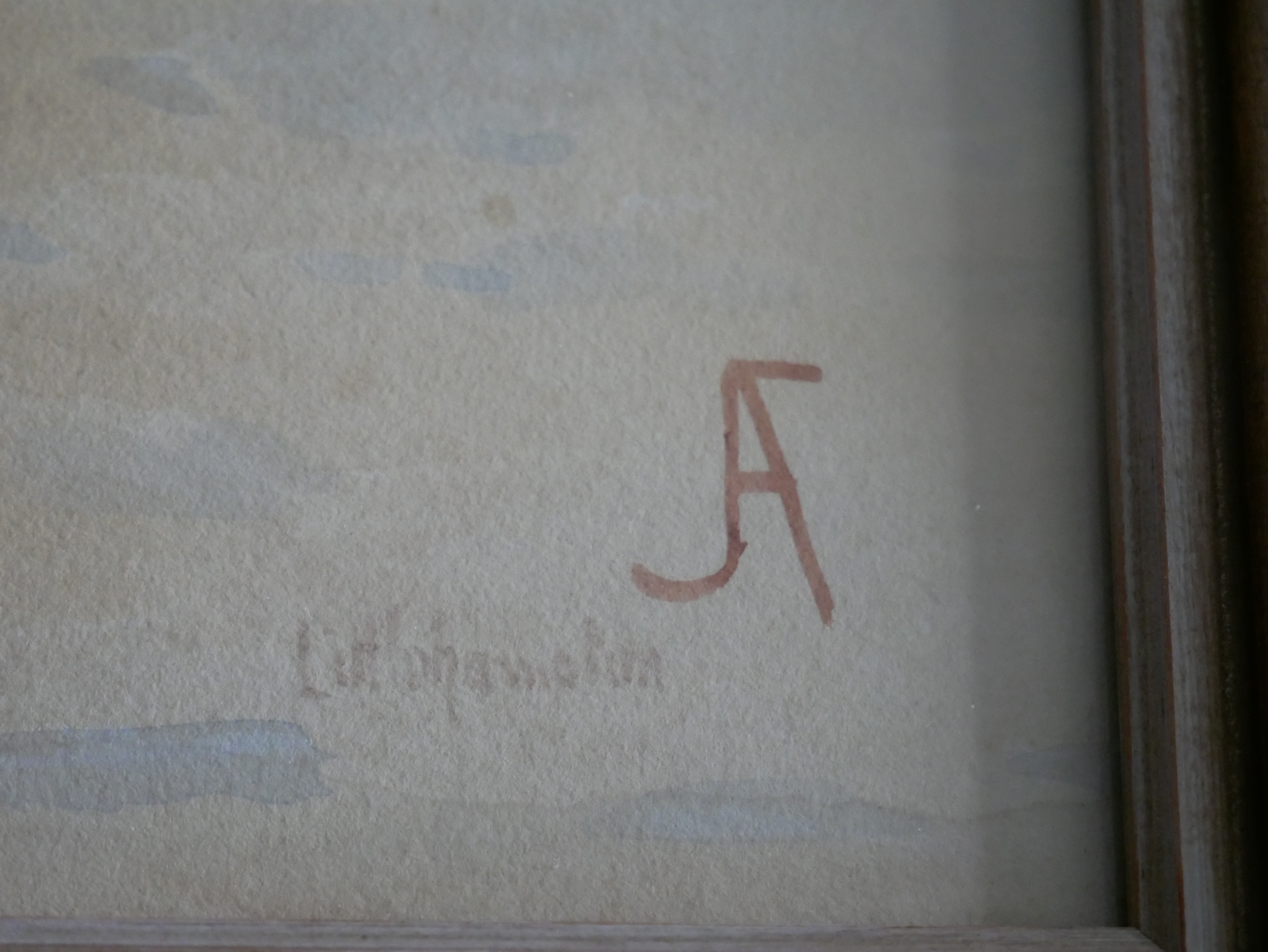
Monogram and place painted

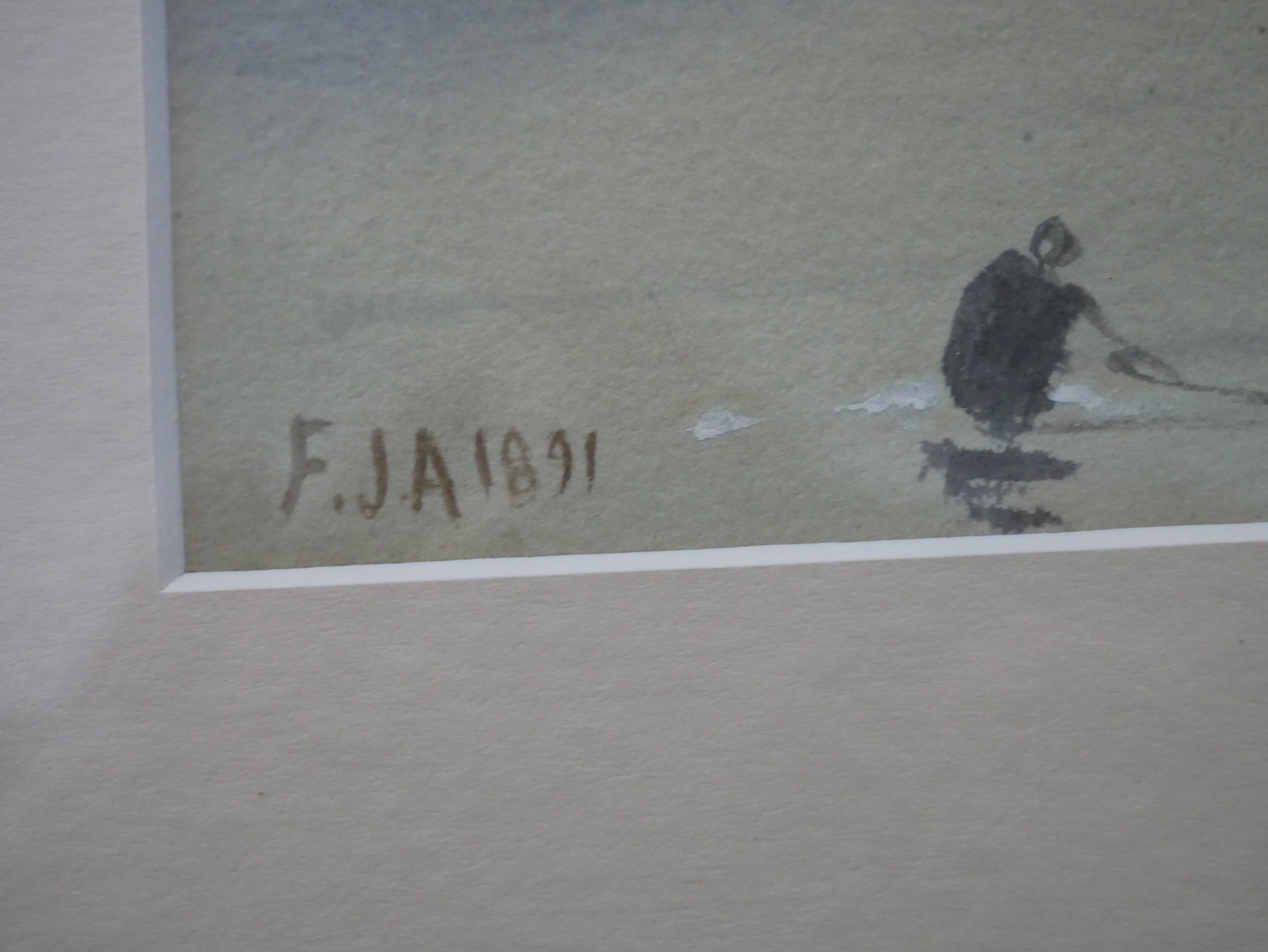
Initials and date

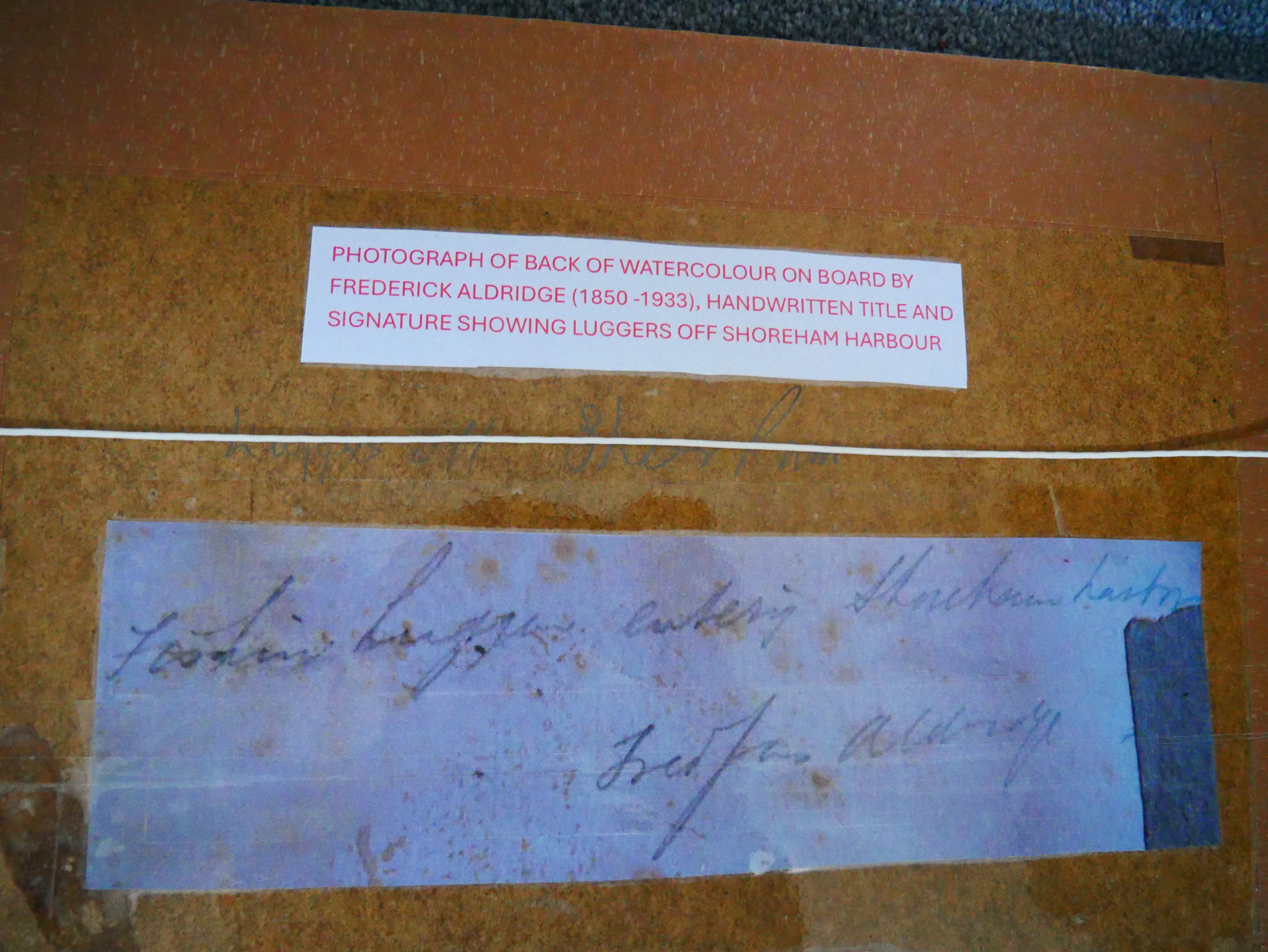
Frederick Aldridge written signature

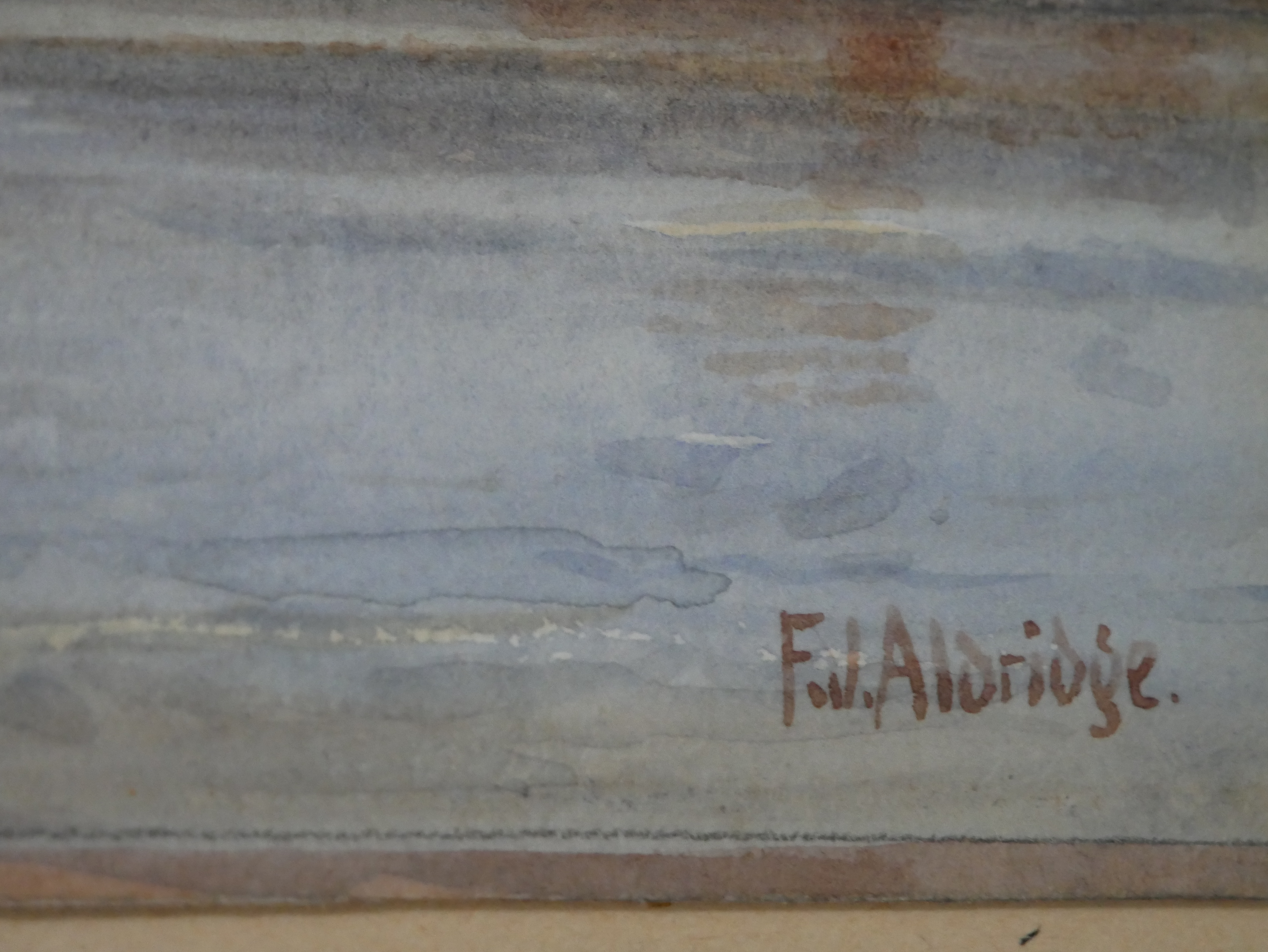
common signature

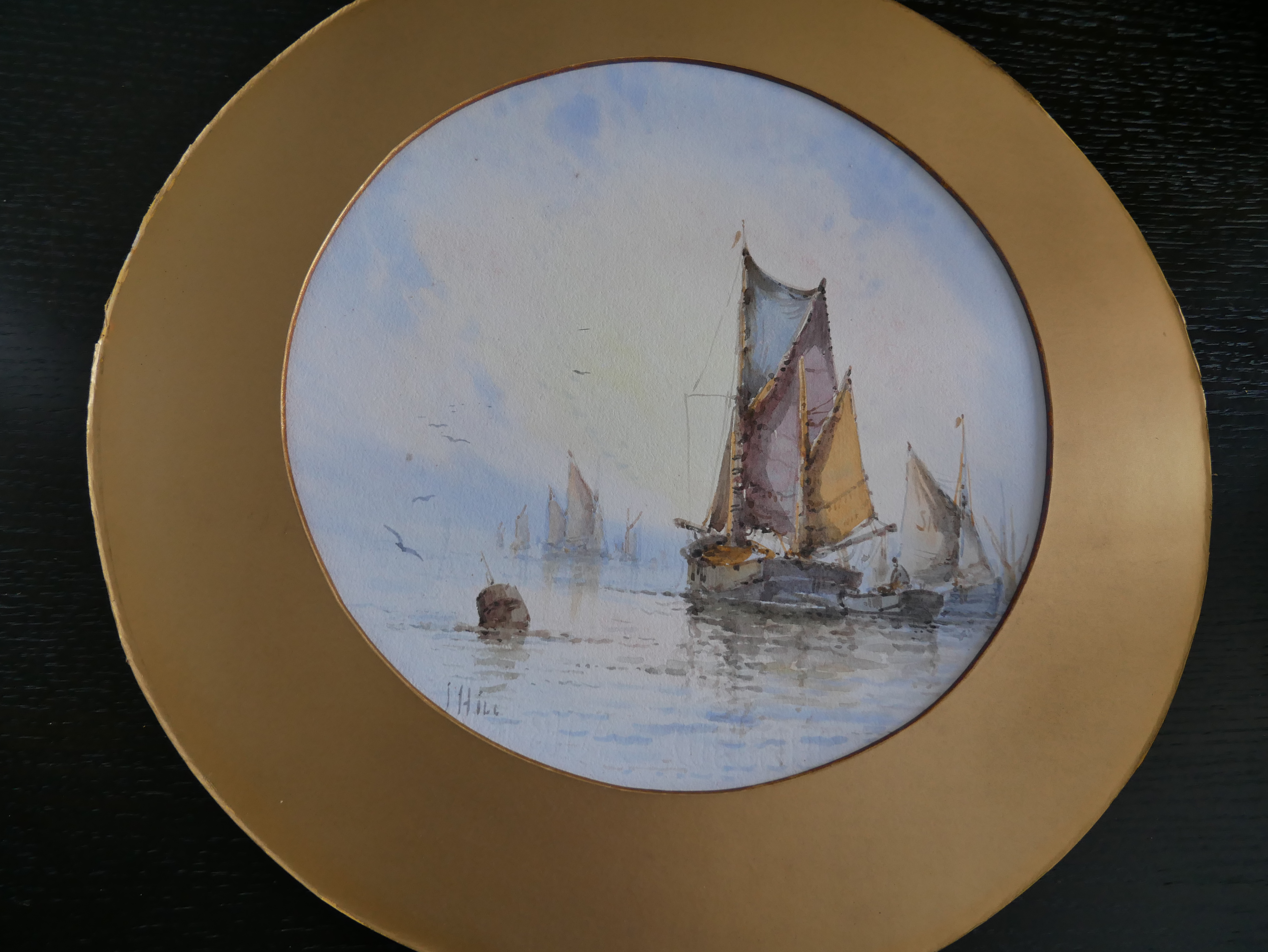
J Hill, a reputed pseudonym used by Aldridge

He signed his works with 3 main confirmed signatures F.J. ALDRIDGE., F.J. Aldridge or a monogram AF. Sometimes he would put a place where he pained, sometimes a date sometimes both. Possibly just F.J.A with date or even found on back of a picture when out of the frame his written signature.

Labels

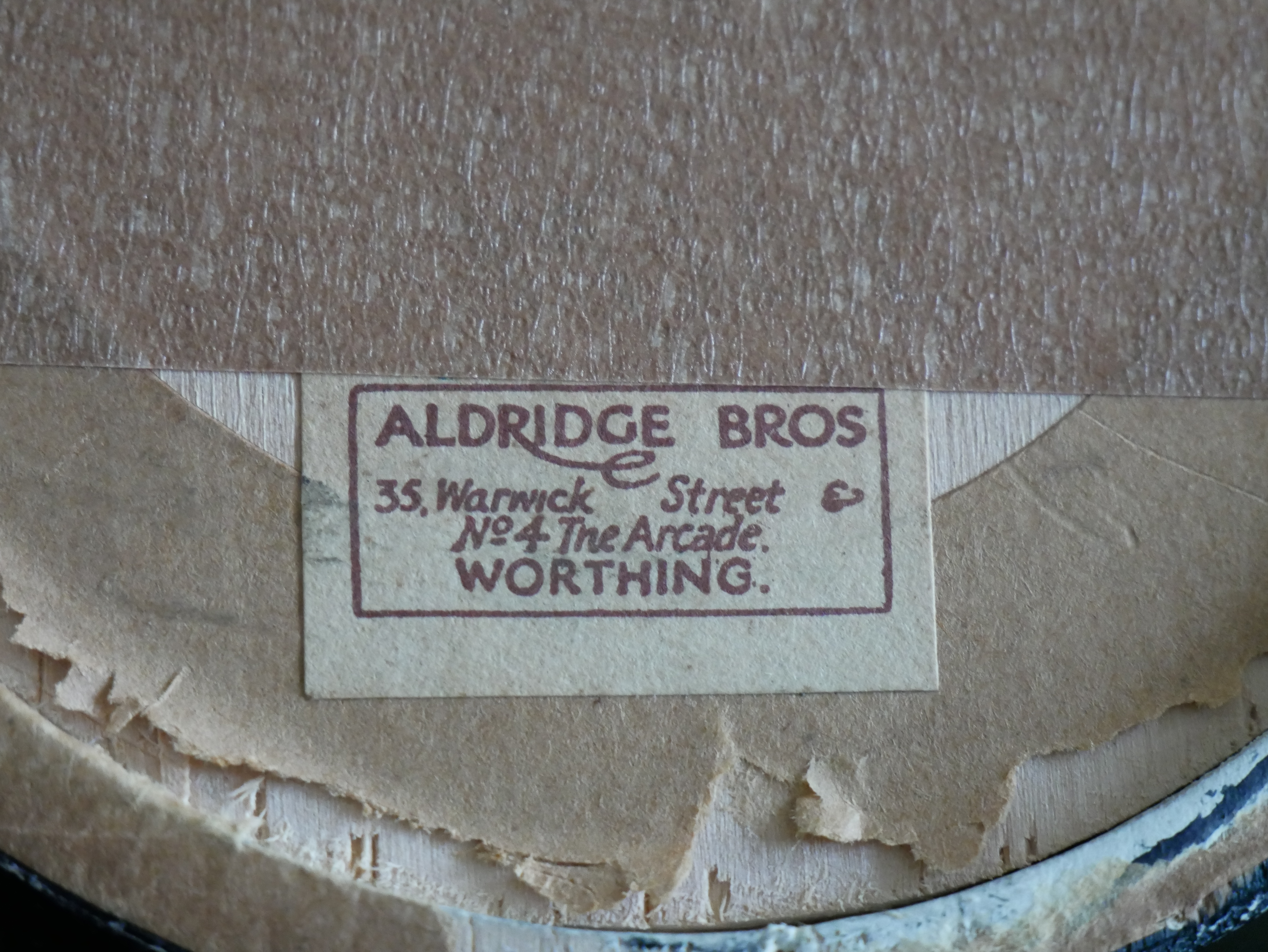
Aldridge Bros painting label for both shops, 1925 onwards

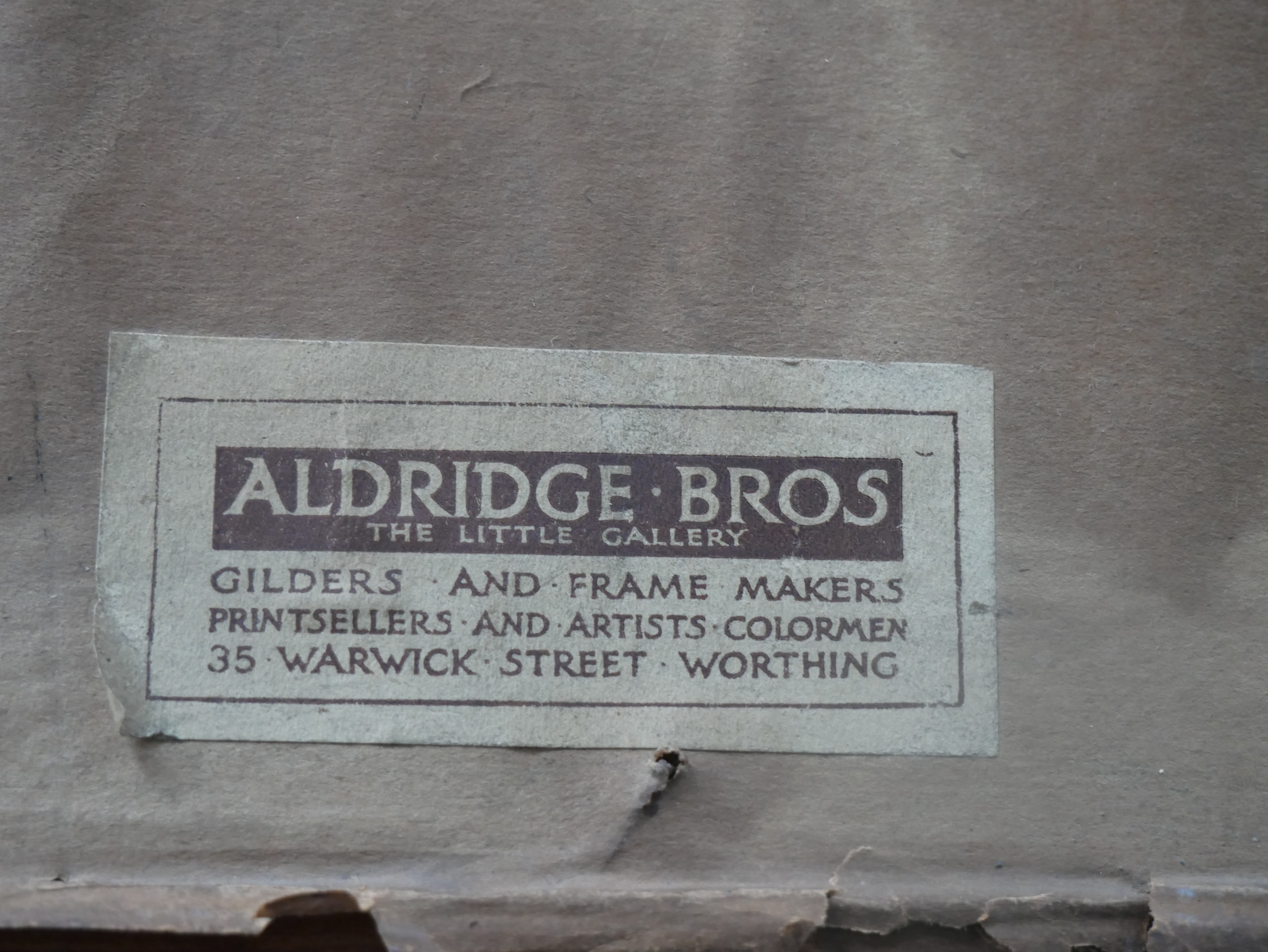
Aldridge Bros painting label shop 35 Warwick street, Worthing pre 1925

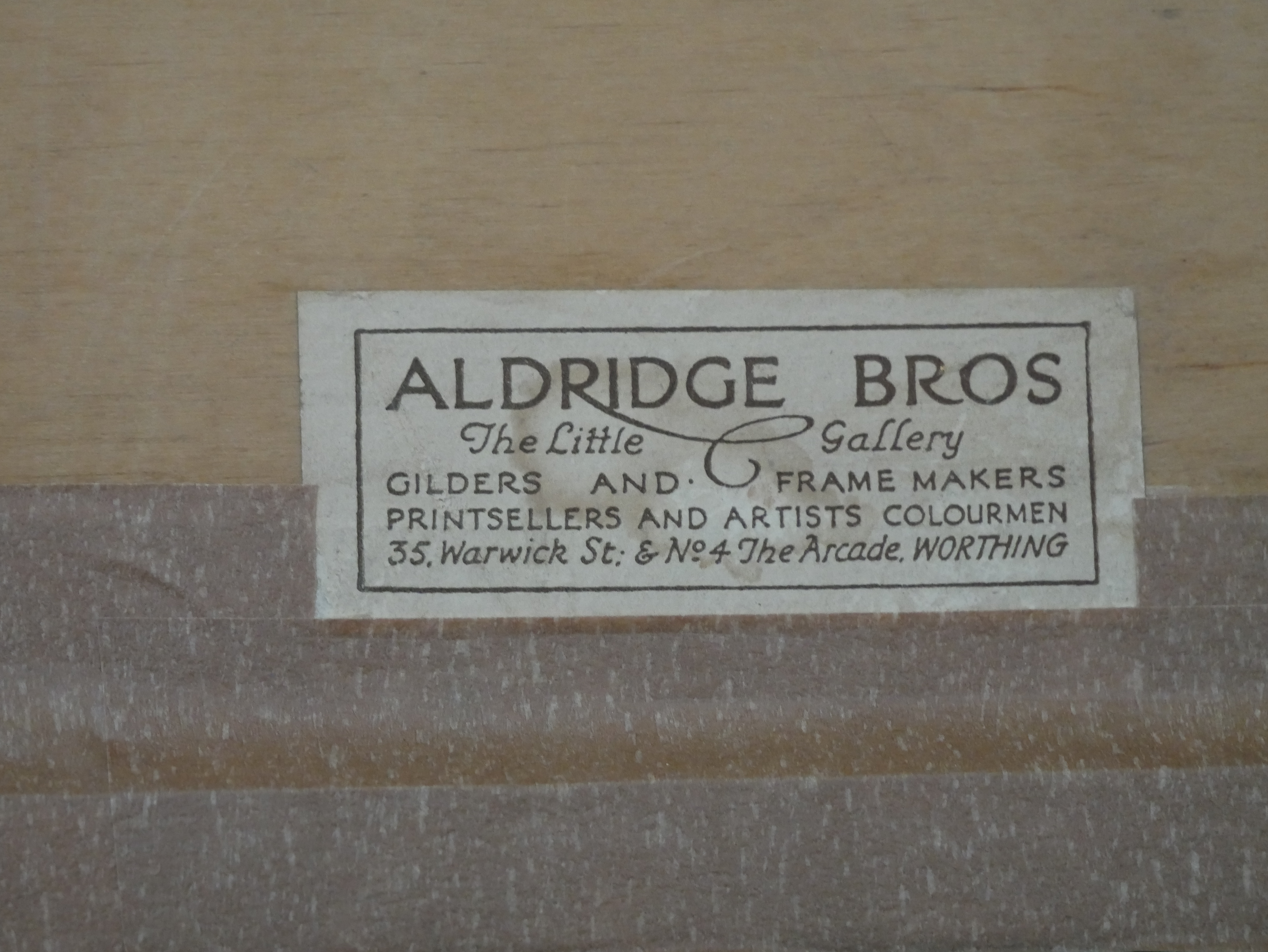
Aldridge Bros label for 'The little Gallery' 35 Warwick street 1925 onwards

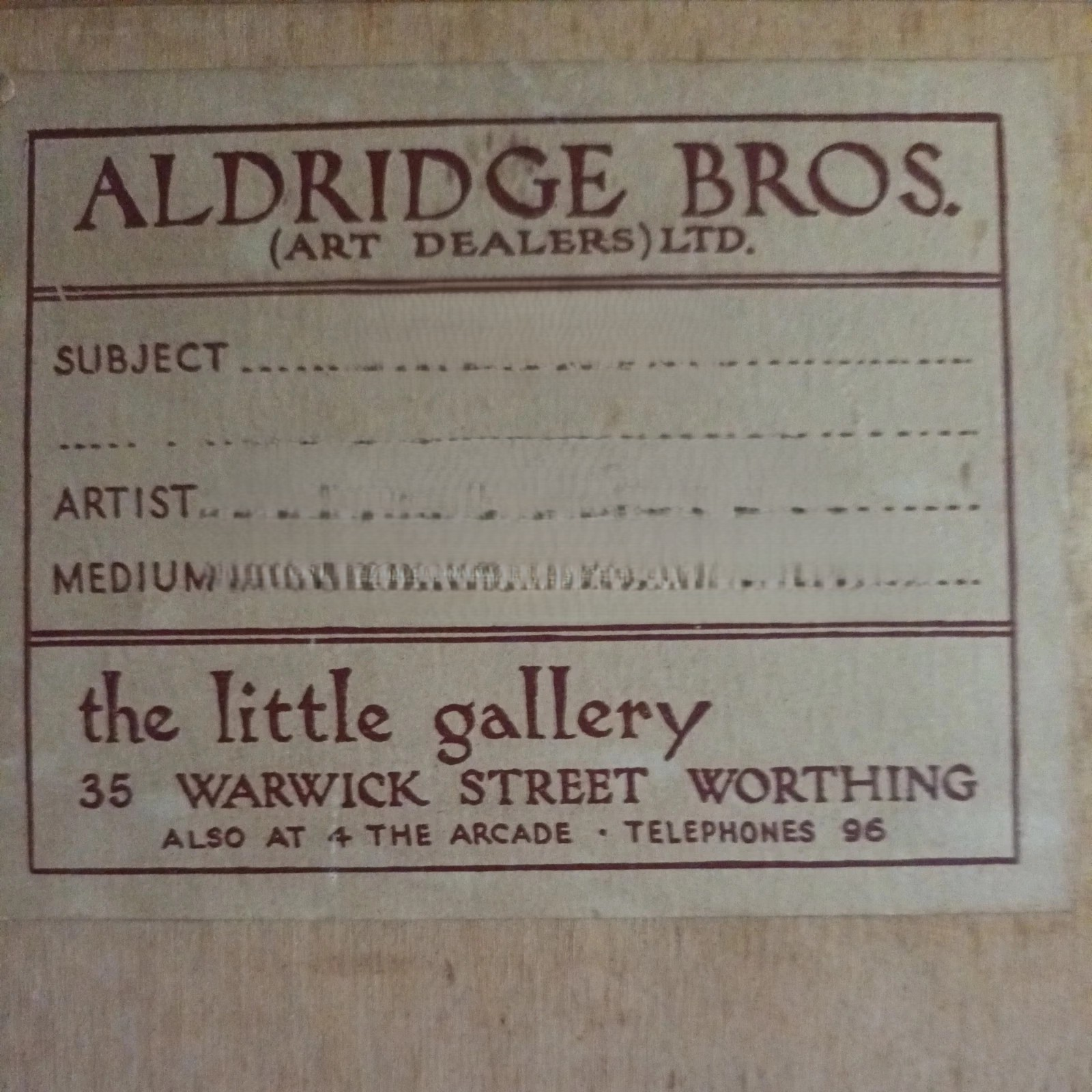
label post 1925 at either shop

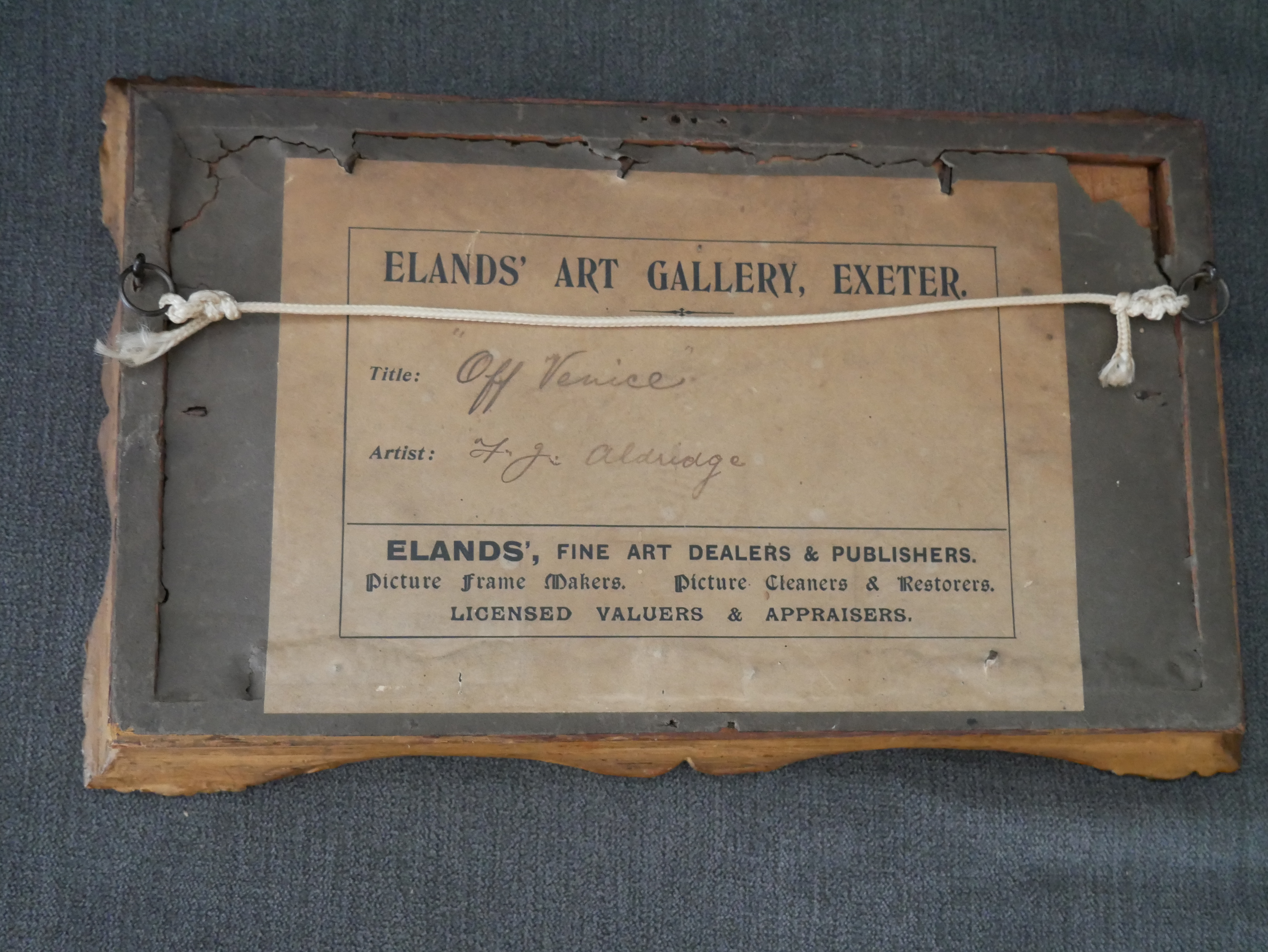
Off Venice label Elands Art Gallery

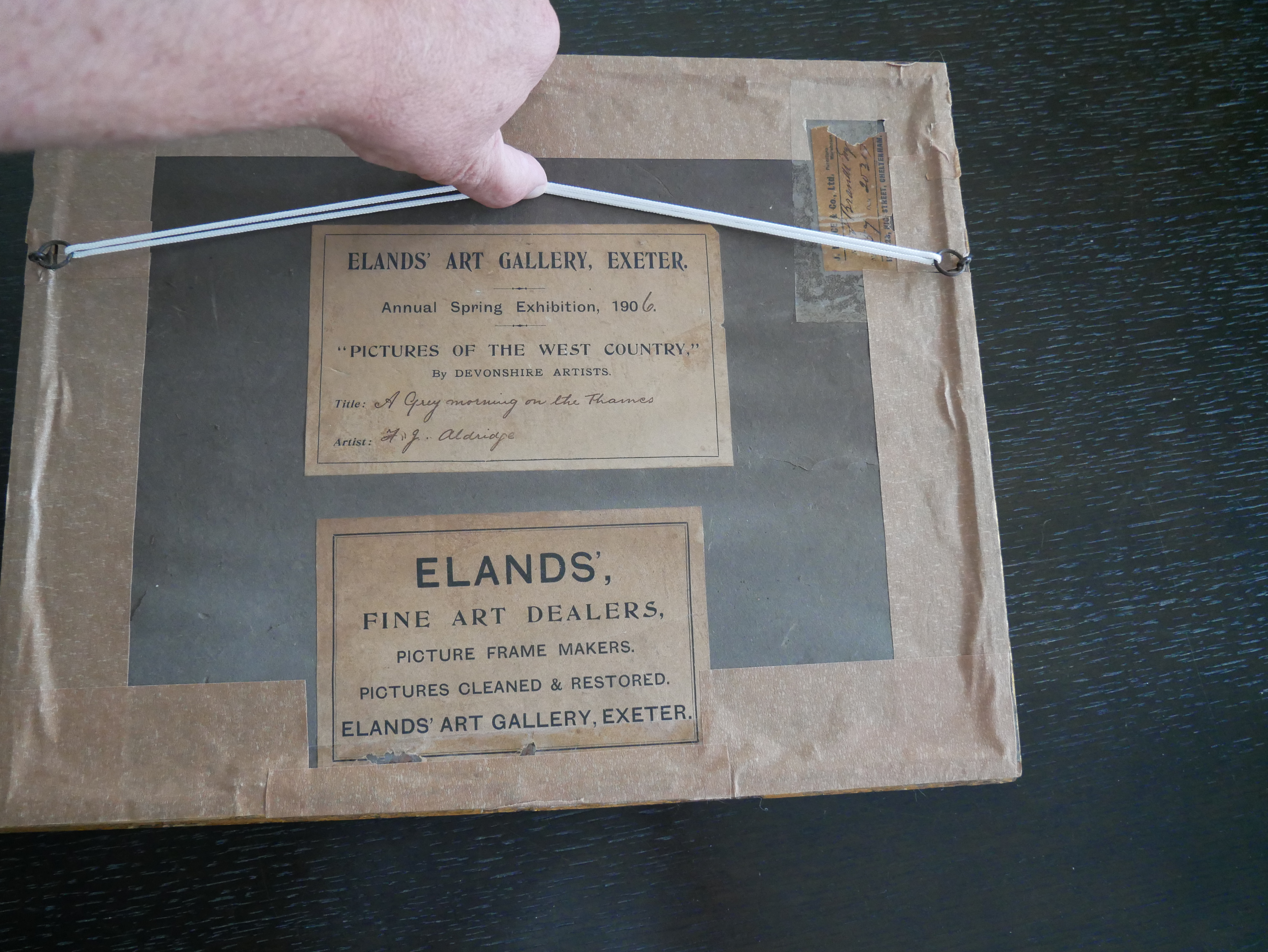
'A Grey morning on the Thames' labels from 1906 exhibition

Dudley Gallery 35th 1899 Exhibition 'Entrance to the public gardens at Venice'

An Aldridge Bros. label on the reverse (verso) of a piece of artwork means that the item was framed, restored, exhibition space, or sold through his shops. Hundreds of different artist's work came through his shops. The names and address on the label gives a clue to when and where the picture was sorted. If the label only had 35 Warwick Street on it this was likely to be pre-1925. If it had no 4 Arcade or both addresses it had to be post 1925 as the shop arcade shop only opened then. Some had the shop name 'The Little Gallery' which was the shop at Warwick street. This though does not date the painting or the artist as it could have been reframed, resorted or just sold there. The 'holy grail' would be a signed painting by him and a label from his shop.

He made visits aboard, most common were Holland (Netherlands), Egypt and Venice. In Egypt 1898 and 1911 his paintings include a pair of watercolours titled 'Cairo & Bizeh' (now Giza), a watercolour titled 'Pyramids at Gizeh and Arab village' a view of Giza plateau and pyramids, and 'Cairo' a signed watercolour from the Nile looking onto the Egyptian landscape dated Feb 1898. In Holland some of his notable painting include were 'Evening at Dordrecht' signed and dated 1922 and 'A Dutch Creek' signed and dated 1908. He had a affinity with windmills as seen by these paintings. He loved Venice and painting many around here. His notable paintings include 'off Venice' exhibition at Elands Art Gallery, Exeter and many of the Lagoon at Venice.

Many of his notable pictures involve the areas of Littlehampton and Shoreham. These involve either ships/ boats around the harbour / port itself or areas leading into these areas.

Sailing in Shoreham harbour at dusk

Sailing into Shoreham harbour

In Shoreham harbour

Titled on painting 'off Shoreham'

Mistletoe steam paddle tug guiding ship into Shoreham harbour

Stella steam paddle tug guiding ship into Shoreham harbour

Littlehampton Harbour found in Littlehampton Museum

Jumna iron steam paddle tug with ship 'on the Arun' towards Littlehampton harbour

In Littlehampton Harbour titled 'Littlehampton'. 1 of pair

Moored up in Littlehampton Harbour. 1 of pair.

He attended Cowes Week many times over a period of around fifty-years.
