= Thomas Bush Hardy =

English painter (1842–1897)

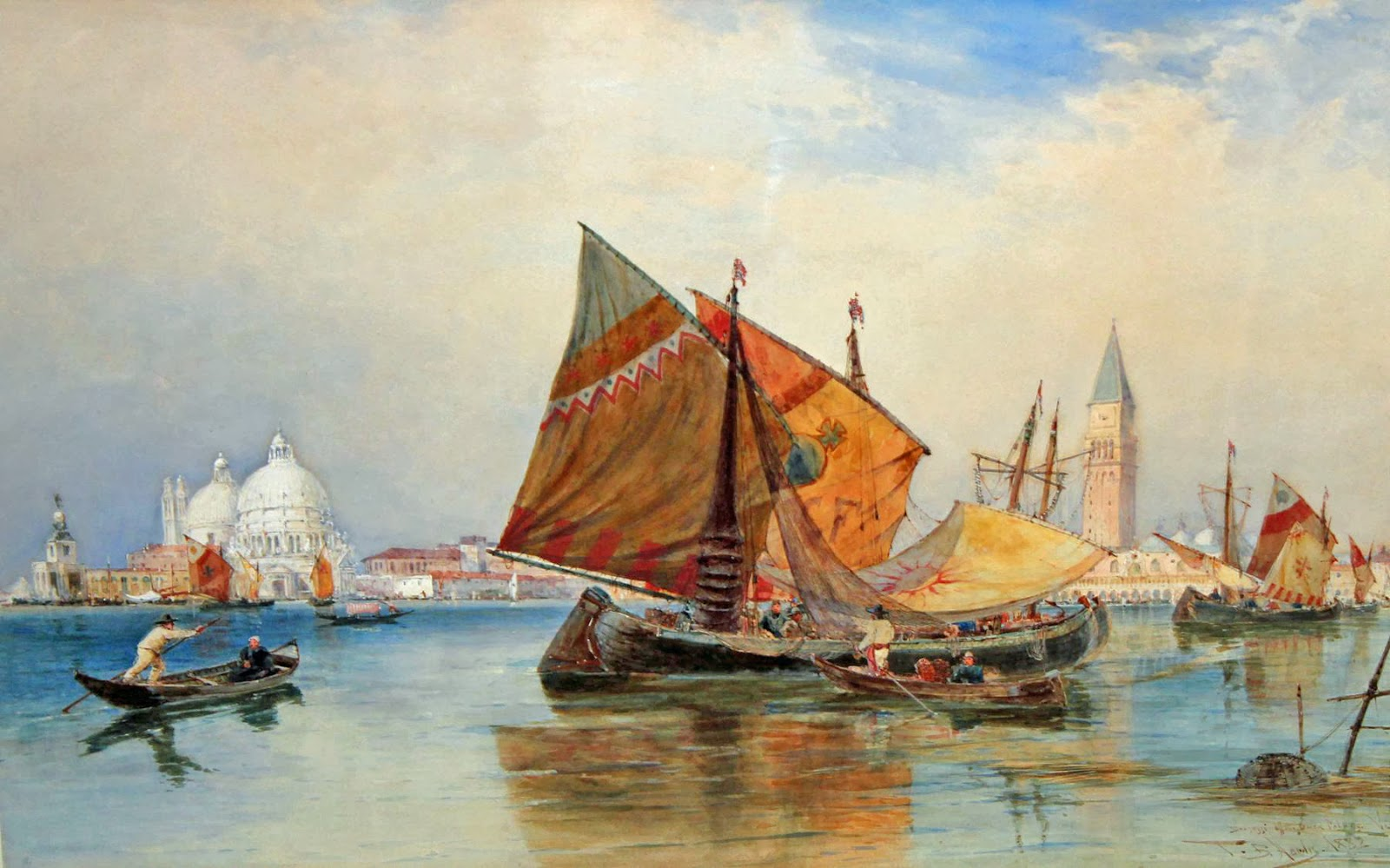
Bragozzi off the Ducal Palace, 1882

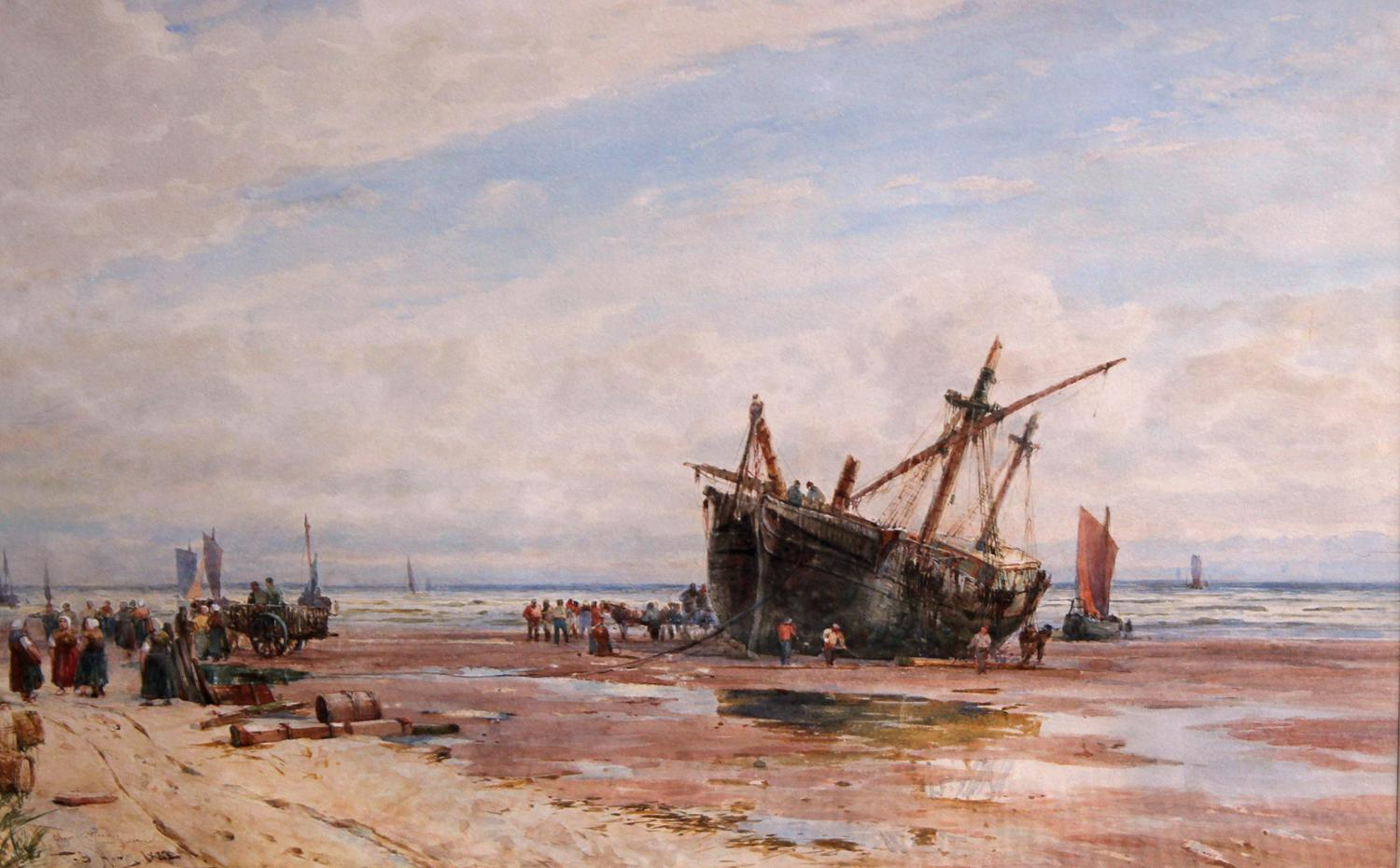
Clearing a Wreck, near Boulogne

Thomas Bush Hardy (3 May 1842 – 15 December 1897) was a British marine painter, normally in watercolours. He was extremely prolific, but his later work, especially the larger and more finished pieces, has been criticized: "Once he had found his well-known formula of sickly yellow-green seas heightened with a knife, and brown knotted ships and rigging, his finished pieces became facile and repetitive".

His work often appears at auction in the UK, and remains popular with collectors. Aspects of his style were imitated by other watercolourists, including Frederick James Aldridge (1850–1933) and Thomas Mortimer.

== Biography ==
Hardy was born in Sheffield, Yorkshire, on 3 May 1842. As a young man he travelled in the Netherlands and Italy, and also fought for the Union in the American Civil War. He first exhibited in London in 1871.

He stood for election to the Royal Institute of Painters in Water Colours (previously the NWS) several times but was never successful, but in 1884 he was elected a Member of the Royal Society of British Artists. He exhibited with the Society and also at the Royal Academy. His paintings feature coastal scenes in England and the Netherlands, the French Channel ports and the Venetian Lagoon.

He died on 15 December 1897 in Maida Vale, London, and was buried in an unmarked grave on the eastern side of Highgate Cemetery.

Hardy had nine children. His son, Dudley Hardy, was a painter, illustrator and poster designer. His daughter, Dorothy, received an MBE after working as a nurse in the First World War.

== Works ==
- Schevening, the Netherlands (1873) is at Lamport Hall in Northamptonshire.
- Towing Boats out of Calais (1878), Laing Art Gallery in Newcastle upon Tyne.
- Seascape (circa 1880) , Rotherham Museum and Galleries.
- Landscape (1882) The National Library of Wales.
- Museums Sheffield Seascape (1887). It also holds two paintings, each called Sea Piece. One is dated 1880 and the other is undated.
- Portsmouth Harbour (1891) is in the collection of the Art Gallery of New South Wales.
- Off the Dutch Coast (1896) is in the collection of Calderdale Metropolitan Borough Council.
- A French Paddle Tug Bringing a Barque into Boulogne Harbour in Heavy Weather is in the National Maritime Museum.
- View on the Grand Canal, Venice (1871),Calais (1886),Boulogne Harbour, and Fishing Boats at Sea are in the Victoria and Albert Museum's collection.
