= Harry B. Neilson =

British illustrator

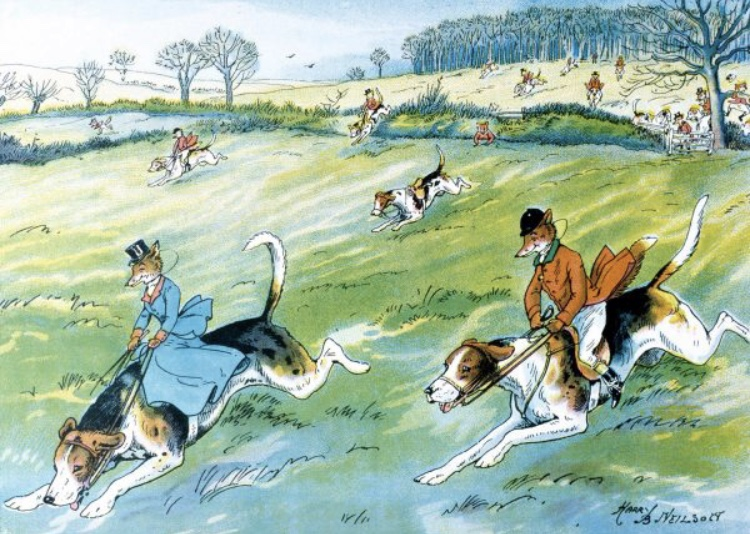
- From The Fox's Frolic (1917)
- Born: Henry Bingham Neilson; 1861; Birkenhead, Cheshire, England
- Died: 13 October 1941 (aged 80); West Kirby, Cheshire, England
- Occupations: Children's author and illustrator
- Writing career
- Genre: Children's literature
- Notable works: Mr Fox's Hunt Breakfast on Xmas Day (1897); The Fox's Frolic (1917)

Henry Bingham Neilson (1861 – 13 October 1941), who signed his work and was usually credited as Harry B. Neilson, less often as H. B. Neilson, was a British illustrator, mostly of children’s books.

His first career was as an engineer and electrician, working for a Liverpool shipbuilder, at sea, and in India, where he was a part-time Indian Army cavalryman, but by the 1890s his career as an illustrator was established and he lived his last 37 years in an English village.

== Life and work ==
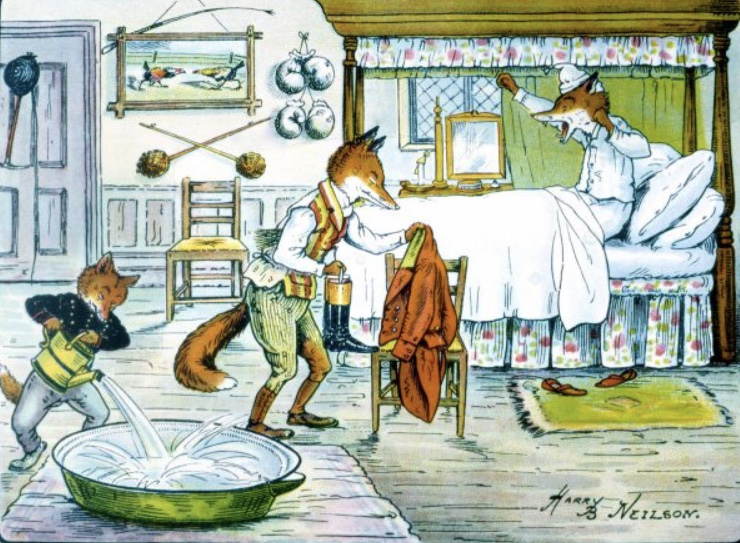
Up at Dawn, from The Fox’s Frolic

Born at Birkenhead, in an area called the Wirral, which was then in Cheshire, Neilson was the son of Andrew and Isabel Anne Neilson and had seven older brothers and sisters. His father was a Scottish merchant who for some years had lived and worked in Brazil, while his mother was a British subject born in Cartagena, Colombia. The family moved to England in the 1850s and was settled in Birkenhead by the time of young Harry's birth in 1861, at 39, Westbourne Road, Birkenhead, a house then set among open fields which stretched into Claughton.

In 1863, the growing Neilson family moved to a new house called Airliewood which Andrew Neilson had had built on an acre of land in Forest Road, Claughton. Neilson later recalled "My father still wore half-Wellington top boots and the old fashioned stocks. The ladies wore poke bonnets, crinolines, Paisley shawls, and many-flounced, voluminous skirts, while young men of fashion affected peg-top trousers, little pork-pie hats with fluttering ribbons, and Dundreary whiskers. Policemen still wore top hats. Croquet was practically the only outdoor game played by ladies."

In 1879, Neilson was apprenticed as an engineer with Laird Brothers, a major shipbuilding firm in Liverpool. After completing this training in 1884, he worked as an electrician on the new Red Star Line transatlantic steamer SS Noordland until 1886. In August of that year, his unmarried sister Isabel Anne died, aged 36, and in administering her estate their father was named as "Andrew Neilson, Gentleman".

Neilson had a cousin in Bihar in British India who was in charge of an indigo plantation there, and in 1887 he went out to join him. While there, he enlisted in the Bihar Light Horse as a part-time trooper. In 1889, his first illustrated book, The Adventures of Sam Pippins, Esq., with the Kilkenny Hunt, was published by Simpkin, Marshall, & Co. Meanwhile, at home in Birkenhead, in 1890 his father died, aged 73, followed in 1893 by his mother, aged 66. His father left property valued at £3,896, equivalent to £432,847 in 2025, with his mother and brother John Robertson Neilson, a cotton broker, appointed as Executors.

During the 1890s, Neilson became active as a book illustrator, and by 1903 had returned to England to live with a sister at a house called Meadowbank, at 36 School Lane, Bidston, a village in his native Wirral. He stayed at Meadowbank for the rest of his life.

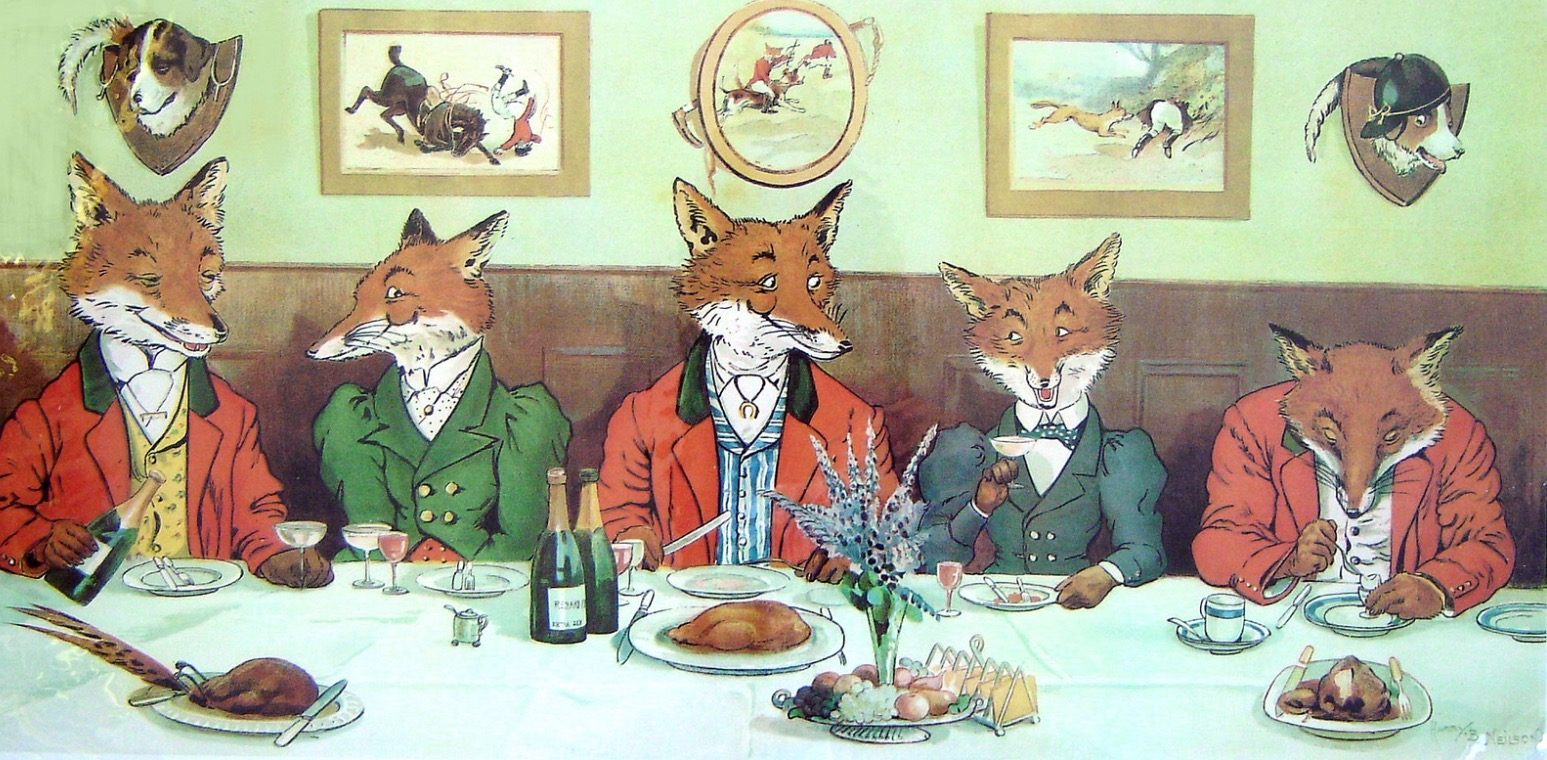
Neilson's Mr Fox's Hunt Breakfast on Xmas Day (1897)

Neilson illustrated many children's books, several of them for the children's writer S. H. Hamer, who conveniently was also an editor with Cassell & Co. Neilson also worked as an illustrator of magazines and designed postcards and Christmas cards. In much of his work he depicted animals dressed as people, like his contemporaries Beatrix Potter and Harry Rountree, but he often showed them taking part in more vigorous activities. In France, he has been compared with Benjamin Rabier. His best-known work, "Mr Fox's Hunt Breakfast on Xmas Day" (pictured) is said to represent five members of the Blankney Hunt, in Lincolnshire and has been widely reproduced. Dressed for hunting, the breakfast party of foxes is eating pheasant and drinking Renard (French for "fox") champagne. Pictures on the wall behind are of hunting scenes, but with foxes in pursuit of men, one of whom is going to ground. The original, a large chromolithograph, was a free gift to readers with the Christmas issue of the Penny Illustrated Paper in December 1897. One hundred years later, in December 1997, it was used as the cover art for the Christmas-week issue of the British magazine Country Life.

Games and Gambols (1902) includes Neilson's notable picture of "The great test match between the Lions and the Kangaroos".

In 1903 and 1904, Neilson worked with the Irish dramatist William Boyle, illustrating two books of comic verse, Comic Capers and Christmas at the Zoo.

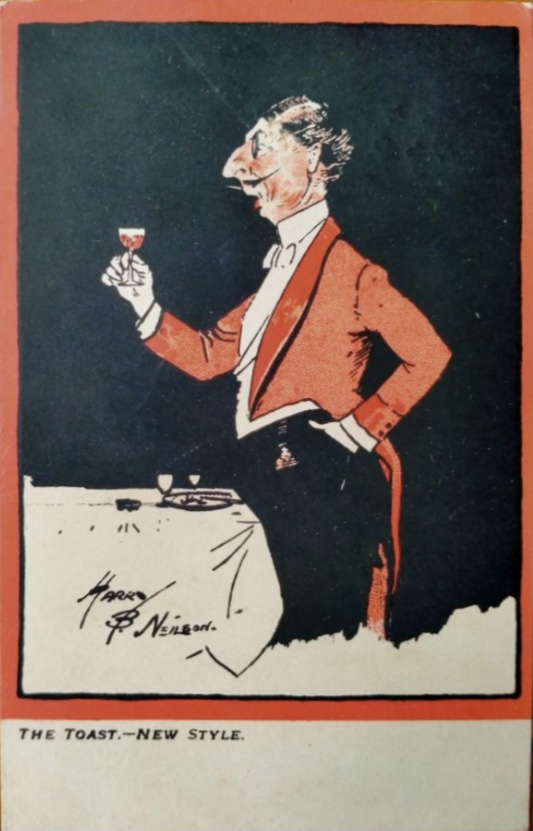
The Toast, New Style, c. 1910

Neilson returned to the theme of "Mr Fox's Hunt Breakfast" in The Fox's Frolic; or, A Day with the Topsy Turvy Hunt (1917), illustrating a long narrative poem by Sir Francis Burnand in which the usual fox hunting roles are reversed, with the foxes riding hounds and becoming the hunters, with "the brush" pursued being a farmer's broom. An American edition appeared in 1935.

Neilson was a keen rider, keeping his own horse, which he groomed himself. In 1935, he published Auld-lang-syne, a book of memoirs and reminiscences of Claughton, Birkenhead, and Bidston, arranging to have it printed by a local firm, Willmer Brothers. One of the brothers, Wrayford Willmer, later remembered the arrival of a "persistent, eccentric little man" with his manuscript.

Neilson died in a nursing home at West Kirby, Cheshire, on 13 October 1941, with his home address given as Meadowbank, School Lane, Bidston, leaving an estate valued at £1070.

An archive of 325 items, including drawings, watercolours, and manuscripts by Neilson is held in the Manuscripts Division of the Charles E. Young Research Library, at the University of California, Los Angeles.

A new edition of The Fox's Frolic was published by Applewood Books in 2009.

== Assessment ==
In his book on Arthur Rackham, Fred Gettings says

The cartoon style is best represented by the work of Harry Neilson, ribald and almost crude in his use of line, working in a style to which certain modern comics are still indebted. Along with Neilson, we may list Stewart Orr and Harry Rowntree... Neilson, and indeed a whole host of Victorian draughtsmen who told animal moralities and fairy stories, portray their animals in clothing... However, the important point is that, for all their human clothing, for all that they speak where necessary with human tongues, and point their morals with something verging on human gesture, these creatures always look like animals.

== Publications ==
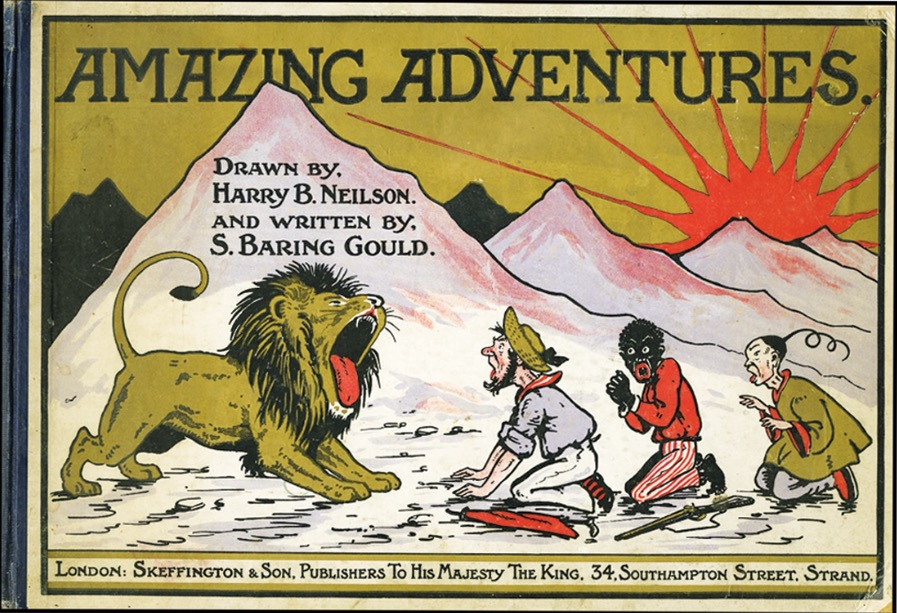
The pictorial cover of Amazing Adventures (1903)

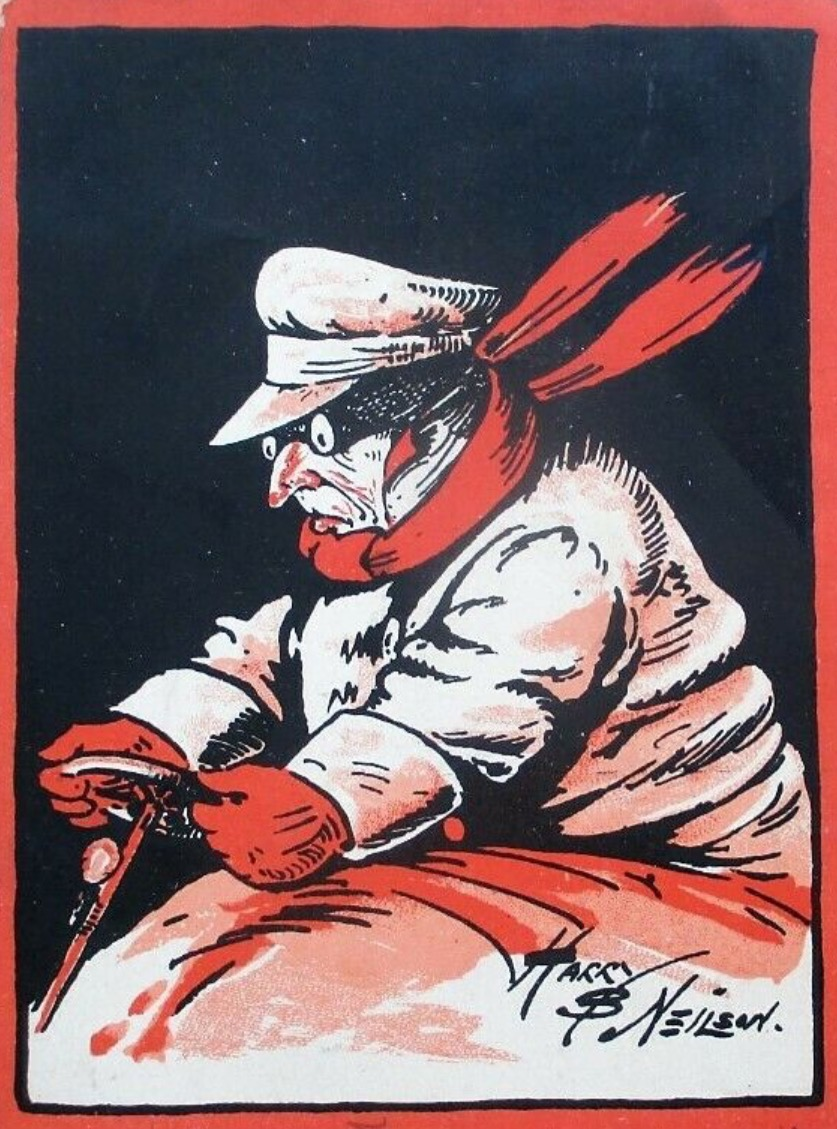
"The Driver, New Style", postcard, c. 1913

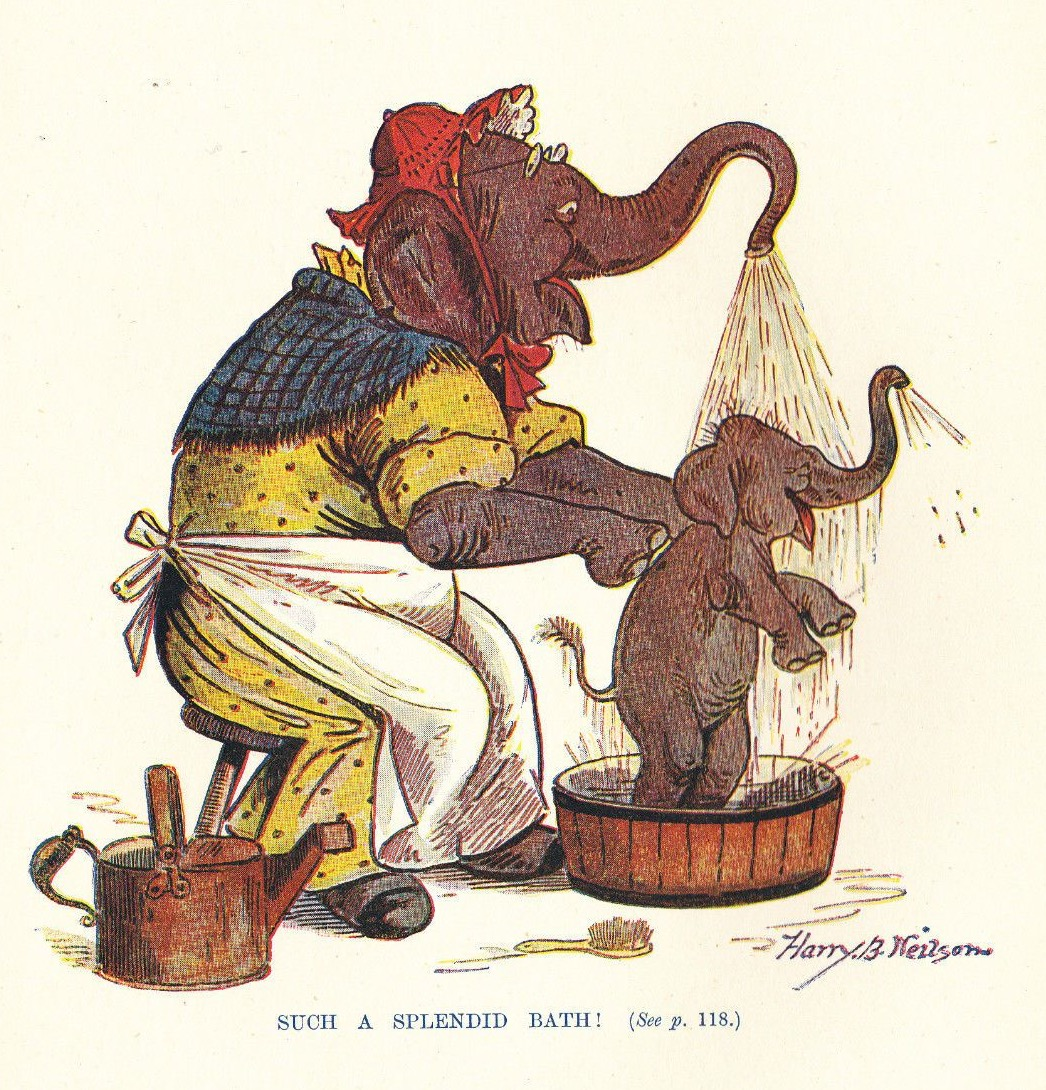
Such a Splendid Bath! (1900)

- H. B. Neilson, The Adventures of Sam Pippins, Esq., with the Kilkenny Hunt, Illustrated and written by Harry B. Neilson (Simpkin, Marshall & Co., London, and John Heywood, Manchester, undated, 1889)
- S. H. Hamer, Micky Magee's Menagerie, or, Strange animals and their doings, illustrated by Harry B. Neilson (Cassell & Company, London, Paris, New York & Melbourne, 1897), OCLC 36821416
- Evelyn Sharp, George Manville Fenn, et al., Little Folks 1899, illustrated by Harry B. Neilson and Lewis Baumer (London: Cassell & Co., 1899)
- Helene Binder, Plauderstundchen (Nuremberg: Theodor Stroefer's Kunstverlag, c. 1899), illustrations
- S. H. Hamer, Whys and Other Whys, or, Curious Creatures and Their Tales, illustrated by Harry B. Neilson (London: Cassell, 1898), OCLC 45597688
- Harry B. Neilson & the Cockiolly Bird, Droll Doings, Illustrations by Harry B. Neilson, with Verses by the Cockiolly Bird (London: Blackie & Son, 1900), OCLC 316020563
- Harry B. Neilson, An Animal A B C (London: Blackie & Son, 1900), OCLC 558108562
- S. H. Hamer, Harry B. Neilson, Topsy-Turvy Tales, or The Exception Proves the Rule (London: Cassell, 1901), OCLC 560016804
- Francis T. Buckland, Curiosities of Natural History, Illustrated by H. B. Neilson (London: Methuen, new edition, 1904)
- S. H. Hamer, The Jungle School; or Dr. Jibber-Jabber Burchall's Academy, With Illustrations by H. B. Neilson (London: Cassell, 1900), OCLC 1078500365
- S. H. Hamer, Peter Piper's Peepshow, with Illustrations by H. B. Neilson and Lewis Baumer (London: Cassell & Company, 1900), OCLC 81766675
- S. H. Hamer, The Ten Travellers, and other tales in prose and verse, illustrated by H. B. Neilson (Cassell & Company, London, Paris, New York & Melbourne, 1902), OCLC 752608454
- H. B. Neilson & John Brymer, Games and Gambols Illustrated by Harry B. Neilson; with Verses by John Brymer (Blackie and Son, 1902), OCLC 65798607
- Sabine Baring-Gould, Amazing Adventures Drawn by H. B. Neilson and Written by S. Baring Gould (London: Skeffington & Son, 1903), OCLC 559700882
- Anon, Bo-Peep: a Treasury for the Little Ones (London, Paris, New York, Melbourne: Cassell and Company, 1903), illustrated by Harry B. Neilson and others
- William Boyle, Comic Capers, Pictures by H. B. Neilson, Verses by William Boyle (1903), OCLC 792763462
- William Boyle, Christmas at the Zoo: Described in Verse by William Boyle, with Coloured Illustrations by H. B. Neilson (1904)
- Old Mother Hubbard drawn by Harry B. Neilson (Port Sunlight: printed and published by Lever Brothers, Soapmakers to H. M. the King; undated)
- Clifton Bingham, The Animals' Academy, illustrated by Harry B. Neilson (London: Blackie & Son, 1904), OCLC 299163852
- S. H. Hamer, Topsy Turvy Tales, with 4 Coloured Plates and numerous Illustrations by Harry B. Neilson (1906)
- Harry B. Neilson, E. A. Cubitt, Jane M. Dealy et al., Arm Chair Stories (London: Blackie and Son, undated)
- Jack the Giant Killer and other stories, illustrated by Harry B. Neilson and others (London: John F. Shaw, undated)
- Louis Wain, Harry B. Neilson, et al., Merry Times in Animal Land (London: James Clarke and Co., undated, c. 1907)
- Harry B. Neilson, The Story of the Gray Goose drawn by Harry B. Neilson (London: Nelson, 1907)
- Animal Playtime with Pictures by Louis Wain, J. A. Shepherd, and Harry B. Neilson &c. (London: James Clarke & Co., 1908)
- Alexander Teixeira de Mattos, tr. Carl Ewald, ill. Harry B. Neilson, The Pond and Other Stories (London: Everett & Co., 1909)
- Louis Wain, Harry B. Neilson, illus., Once Upon a Time (London: S. W. Partridge & Co., 1910)
- Harry B. Neilson, The Farmyard: Over Sixty Lifelike Animals (1912)
- Anon., Little Leo's Birthday: Pictures and Verses For Little Folk (London, Glasgow and Bombay: Blackie and Son Limited, c. 1913), illustrated by Harry B. Neilson and others
- Cole’s Jingle Jungle Book: Pictures and Verses for Little Folk illustrated by Harry B. Neilson (Melbourne, Sydney, Adelaide, Commonwealth of Australia: E. W. Cole, 1915)
- F. C. Burnand, The Fox's Frolic; or, A Day with the Topsy Turvy Hunt, illustrated by Harry B. Neilson (London & Glasgow: Wm. Collins, Sons & Co., 1917)
  - The Fox's Frolic (New York: William Collins, 1935)
  - The Fox's Frolic (New edition, Applewood Books, 2009, ISBN 978-1429090797)
- Harry B. Neilson, Jolly Jaunts (Collins, London & Glasgow, undated), OCLC 37389410
- Birdie's Picture Book, with stories and illustrations by Harry B Neilson, H. G. C. Lambert, and others (London: S. W. Partridge & Co., undated, c. 1919) OCLC 499243124
- Partridges Children's Annual - Fourth Year of Issue with Illustrations by Louis Wain, Cecil Aldin, H G C Marsh Lambert, Harry B. Nielson, Frank Hart, M. Bowley etc. (London: S. W. Partridge & Co Ltd, c. 1920)
- Harry B. Neilson, A Little Pickle (undated, c. 1920)
- Harry B. Neilson, Harry B. Neilson's A.B.C. (London: Collins, 1921)
- Harry B. Neilson, Mr. Jumbo at Home (Blackie, October 1921)
- Harry B. Neilson, More Jumbo Stories (Blackie & Son, undated)
- Harry B. Neilson, Jumbo’s Jolly Tales (Blackie & Son, undated)
- Baron Krakemsides, The Careless chicken, Illus. by Harry B. Neilson (London: Frederick Warne, 1924)
- Edith E. Millard, Mr Skiddleywinks, Illustrated by Harry B. Neilson (London: W. & R. Chambers, undated, but advertised in The Publisher 1927)
  - Edith E. Millard, Mr Skiddleywinks, Illustrated by Harry B. Neilson (New York: Frederick A. Stokes Co., 1930)
- Harry B. Neilson, Auld-lang-syne: recollections and rural records of old Claughton, Birkenhead and Bidston with other reminiscences (Willmer Brothers, 1935, OCLC 23298610)
- S. H. Hamer, Escuela de Animales, illustrado por Harry B. Neilson (Barcelona: Ramon Sopena, 1942), OCLC 431714481

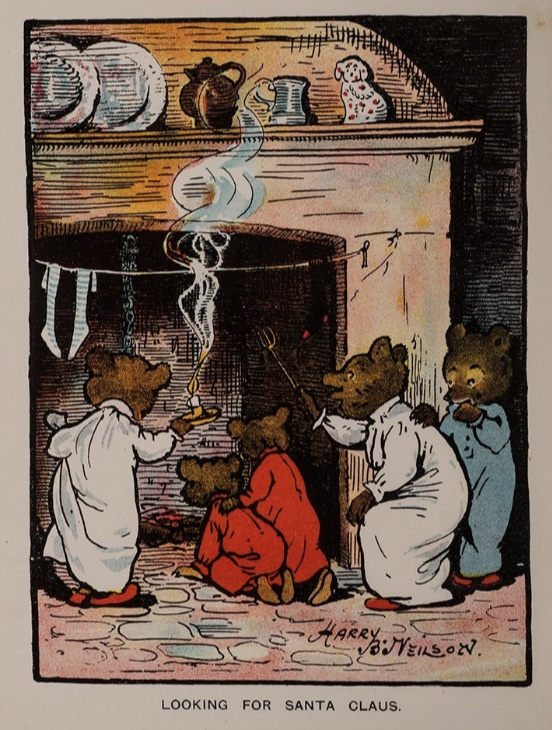
"Looking for Santa Claus", 1910
