= Maggie Browne =

English writer (b. 1864, d. 1937)

Maggie Browne, the pen-name of Margaret Andrewes née Hamer (1864-1937), was an English author of fiction and non-fiction children's books, who is best known today for Wanted, a King, an Alice in Wonderland-type story.

== Early life and education ==
Browne was born Margaret Hamer in 1864 in Leeds, Yorkshire, the daughter of John Hamer (1837–1906), a Yorkshireman from Halifax who owned a bookselling business in Leeds, and Sarah Sharp Hamer, née Heaton, a writer of children's books. John Heaton, Hamer's maternal grandfather, was also a bookseller in Leeds. John Hamer joined the staff of Cassell's, the publishers, in the 1860s, where he was publishing manager from 1867 till 1900. By 1871, the family had moved to Islington, in London. Hamer's younger brother, Sam Hield Hamer, also became an editor at Cassell; he is credited with "discovering" Arthur Rackham as an illustrator. He wrote under the name of Sam Browne.

== Career ==
Browne's first five books were published in 1884, when she was twenty, by Cassell, the publisher where both her father and brother worked. Chats About Germany was mentioned among forthcoming publications in September 1884. It was one of a series from Cassell of books for young readers about other countries, at a time when "everybody nowadays is expected to know a little about German and much about Germany." It was well received, and was described by reviewers as "a pleasantly chatty volume, not too learned", in which "all manner of odds and ends of information are brought together, and the simplicity and ease of the author's narrative should make her work popular with children." Chats About Germany was re-issued in 1889, when one reviewer considered it "perhaps the best of the series", and described Maggie Browne as "so able a writer".

Little Mothers And Their Children and Our School Day Hours (both 1884) were two of the four volumes, printed separately, that comprised Cassell's Album for Home, School and Play. In Little Mothers, "all the amusing "make-believes" of little girls as to their dollies are quaintly set forth." It was "narrated in the simplest of language", and "deserves to be very popular in the nursery". Browne's two other 1884 titles, Our Pretty Pets and Creatures Tame, were also part of an album by Cassell, My Own Album of Animals. They were "written in an easy simple style, and in a way likely to attract and amuse children."

Wanted, a King, Or, How Merle Set the Nursery Rhymes to Right (1890) is the best-known of Browne's works in the 21st century, with its own entry in the second edition of The Oxford Companion of Children's Literature. As the subtitle indicates, the book features nursery rhymes and their characters, which the heroine, Merle, encounters in a place called Endom as she dreams while in bed recovering from a fall. Contemporary reviews praised her "lively and imaginative work. The author is to be most heartily congratulated on having made the very most of a novel idea. She has written a real fairy book, such as ought to make her popular in all the nurseries of the country ..... they will ask Miss Maggie Browne for more." The Gloucester Journal described the author as "a young lady who is known and loved in the world of juvenile literature", who "succeeds where others may fail because she is in thorough sympathy both with her task and with her young readers", and wrote, "everybody is made happy, by means which the madcap ingenuity of the author renders equally probable and satisfactory." Some reviewers recognised it as "a clever story of the "Alice in Wonderland" type in which Miss Maggie Browne has shown a keen appreciation of the likings of children... There is much genuine humour in this brightly-woven tale..." Lewis Carroll reportedly owned a copy "as part of his collection of 'books of the Alice type'." A modern scholar notes differences between Merle and Alice, describing Merle as "an original and engaging character, courageous and defiant in her determination to vanquish the autocratic Grunter Grim." Instead of "adapting and acquiescing" as Alice had done, "Merle is encouraged to 'Defy, Deride, Desist, Deny' ... [her] successes reveal the ways that nonsense and imagination can oppose socially imposed expectations and constraints."

A dramatised version of Wanted, a King by Maude Scott was produced at the St. Pancras People's Theatre, London, in 1928.

Browne followed Wanted, a King with Pleasant Work for Busy Fingers, which appeared in 1881. As The Graphic pointed out, "Not all children love reading as mothers and nurses find to their cost when a wet day keeps the little ones prisoners. To solve their perplexities, in steps Miss Maggie Browne with a most useful little Manual, 'Pleasant Work for Busy Fingers' (Cassell) which will teach restless children to make the most delightful things out of the humblest material - paper, beads clay and so forth. Founding her volume on a German original, Miss Browne presents her subject in most practical form with numerous and diagrams likely to convince the slowest pupil."

Two Old Ladies, Two Foolish Fairies and a Tom Cat (the hardback edition of previously serialised The Surprising Adventures of Tuppy and Tue 1897) was reviewed in Lloyd's Weekly Newspaper, which wrote: "Children are who are lucky enough get this pretty book will rejoice in a treasure. Two young fairies leave fairyland to find out whether children have forgotten the fairies. They take with them Cinderella's slippers and other fairy properties. Their adventures are many but in the end find that the children love fairy stories as much as ever they did. They will certainly be fond of this one".

Browne's stories also appeared in Little Folks, Cassell & Co's "magazine for the young". Some, including The Surprising Adventures of Tuppy and Tue and her last known published work, The Book Of Betty Barber, were serialised in Little Folks in 1896 and 1901, respectively, before being issued in book form with illustrations by Arthur Rackham (Tuppy and Tue renamed Two Old Ladies, Two Foolish Fairies and a Tom Cat, published by Cassell in 1897, and The Book of Betty Barber published by Duckworth & Co in 1910). The Scotsman described it as "a charming story of the fantastical adventures of some very fantastical children", while The Tatler explained that "Betty had written the book so that when she was grown up and stupid she would know what her children would like or dislike. ... And then followed such a wonderful time ...: such adventures, such curious surprises, such unexpected excursions into Sum Land, Music Land, Paint Land, Nonsense Land, until at last [the] book comes to an end, and then one wants to turn back and read it all over again."

== Personal life ==
Browne's older brother, William Heaton Hamer (1862–1936) was a medical man who was Medical Officer of Health for London and was knighted for his work in 1923.

In 1896, Browne married Herbert Edward Andrewes a stockbroker and former member of the Indian Civil Service. Herbert was an older brother of Frederick William Andrewes who had married Margaret's sister, Phyllis Mary Hamer, the previous year.

Herbert and Margaret had two children – Ursula Andrewes (born 1899), a university lecturer and Humfrey Andrewes (born 1902), an electrical engineer.

Browne died on 11 January 1937 at North Grove, Highgate leaving £7,250 6s 8d.

== Books ==
- Chats About Germany (1884)
- The Album for Home, School and Play (1884)

- Little Mothers And Their Children
- Our School Day Hours

- My Own Album of Animals (1884)

- Creatures Tame
- Our Pretty Pets

- Our Holiday Hours (1887)
- Up And Down The Garden (1887)
- Wandering Ways (1889)
- Dumb Friends (1889)
- Wanted – A King, illustrated by Harry Furniss. (1890)
- Pleasant Work For Busy Fingers (1891)
- A Bundle of Tales (1892) (with Sam Browne and Aunt Ethel)
- Rub-A-Dub Tales (1892)
- Firelight Stories (1892)
- Sunday Stories For Small People (1893)
- Tales Told For Sunday (1893)
- Bright Tales And Funny Pictures (1894)
- Two Old Ladies, Two Foolish Fairies And A Tom Cat (first serialised in Cassell's Little Folks, 1896 as The Surprising Adventures of Tuppy and Tue (Cassell & Co 1897)
- "Kurus – the King of the Cannibal Islands", in A Big Temptation (1900), by L. T. Meade, M. B. Manwell and Maggie Brown
- How To Get Up A Children's Play (1903)
- The Book Of Betty Barber, illustrated by Arthur Rackham. (Duckworth, 1910; first serialised in Cassell's Little Folks, 1901)
