= Sarah Sharp Hamer =

English novelist (1839–1927)

- Born: Sarah Sharp Heaton; 25 August 1839; Leeds, Yorkshire, England
- Died: 1927 (aged 87–88)
- Spouse: John Hamer (m. 1861)
- Children: 6, incl. Sam H. Hamer, Margaret Hamer
- Writing career
- Pen name: Phillis Browne, Phyllis Browne, Olive Patch
- Period: 19th century
- Genres: Home-economics, history, and children’s literature

Sarah Sharp Hamer was a 19th-century novelist from Yorkshire, England who wrote in several different genres, including home-economics, history, and children's literature. Hamer wrote more than a dozen books under three different pen names including What Girls Can Do (Phillis Browne), Mrs. Somerville and Mary Carpenter (Phyllis Browne), and Happy Little People (Olive Patch). Her son, Sam Hield Hamer, was also a notable children's author.

See below section "List of Books" for the full list of her works written under all her pseudonyms.

== Early childhood ==
Sarah Sharp (Heaton) Hamer was born on 25 August 1839 in Leeds, Yorkshire, England. According to a census in 1851 and other records, Sarah was born to parents John Heaton (1802–1866) and Rachel Aspin (1806–1868) and was one of five children in the family. However, baptismal records show that Sarah's mother is a woman named Elizabeth Heaton. Sarah Sharp Heaton was baptised at St. Peter's in Leeds, England on 15 September 1839. Not much is known about Sarah Heaton as a child, her siblings, or her parents. Legal documentation states that that John Heaton, Sarah's father was a bookseller, which may have had an impact on Sarah's career choice

== Marriage and adult life ==
Sarah Sharp Hamer was married at the Camden Road Baptist Chapel in London on 25 July 1861 to John Hamer, who was an Englishman born in 1837. The couple had six children and lived in District 9 of St. Pancras, London, England in 1881. Two of their children followed in their parents’ footsteps and were also authors, editors, and publishers. As a writer, Hamer published most if not all of her works through Cassell and Company, a publishing firm that has since been bought by Orion Publishing. She died on 1 February 1927 at 69 Dartmouth Patk Hill, Kentish Town.

== Publications and legacy ==
Sarah Hamer continued to write and publish novels throughout her lifetime. Hamer wrote largely for young girls, specifically in the areas of home economics and natural history. Her book The Dictionary of Dainty Breakfasts (under the pseudonym Phillis Browne) was notable for helping set the trend of establishing breakfast as a necessary third meal of the day, as well as popularising many common English breakfast foods. According to Kaori O'Connor "Early English cookbooks have recipes for lunch and for dinner, but no recipes at all for breakfast. Large breakfasts do not figure in English life or cookbooks until the nineteenth century, when they appear with dramatic suddenness." Food culture and "national" cuisines are often considered major elements of national identity and considered "sensitive barometers of both change and fundamental values" for a society. Hamer, along with other women writing instructional and scientific books for children, "were excluded from practicing as scientists, and thus from demonstrably adding new knowledge to the world; still, they were deeply invested in making science comprehensible and available to readers"

=== Notable children ===
Sam H. Hamer began his career by editing the Little Folks Magazine, for Cassell and Company. After he worked as an editor, Sam Hamer wrote numerous books including The Dolomites, Sunlight and Shade, and Stories and Pictures for Sundays. For his writing, Sam Hamer even used a pen name for some of his works, just like his mother---Sam Browne.

The other writer in the family was Margaret Hamer, who wrote under the pen name Maggie Browne and published Two Old Ladies, Two Foolish Fairies, and a Tom Cat which was illustrated by Arthur Rackham, Chats about Germany, Little Mothers and their Children, and Wandering Ways.

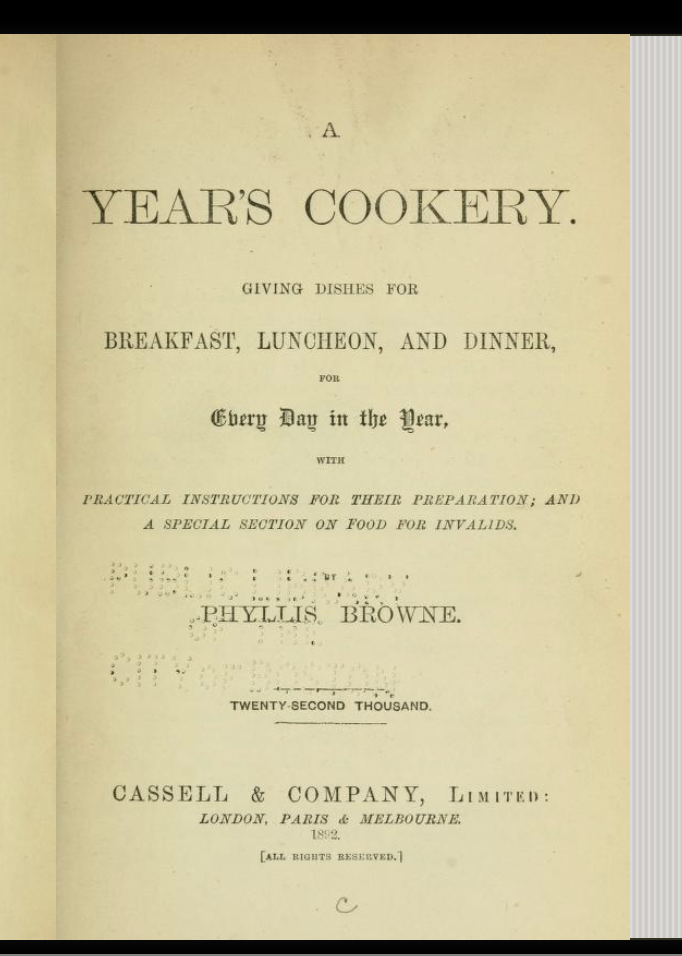
Photo of "A Year's Cookery," one of Hamer's books on cooking

=== Books ===
==== As Phyllis Browne ====
- Mrs. Somerville and Mary Carpenter
- Diet and Cookery for Common Ailments
- The Girl's Own Cooking Book
- Myself and My Friends
- The Dictionary of Dainty Breakfasts
- Common-Sense Housekeeping
- A Year's Cookery. Giving Dishes for Breakfast, Lunch, and Dinner, for Every Day in the Year, Practical Instructions for Their Preparation; And A Special Section On Food For Invalids
- What Girls can Do: A Book for Mothers and Daughters
- Field Friends and Forest Foes
- Talks with Mothers: On the Home Training of Children

==== As Olive Patch ====
- Sunny Spain: Its People and Places, With Glimpses of Its History
- Happy Little People
- Christmas Frolic and Fun
- A Parcel of Children With Some Account of their Doings
- Our Darlings and their Pets
- Familiar Friends
