= Lewis Baumer =

English caricaturist

Lewis Christopher Edward Baumer (8 August 1870 – 25 October 1963) was best known as an English cartoonist who worked for more than fifty years for the British magazine Punch, from 1897. He was also a portrait and still life painter, pastellist, magazine and (mostly children's) book illustrator. His legacy includes many portraits, advertisements and still life paintings in the first half of the 20th century. He contributed to the revival of the tradition of portraiture using pastels, and was accomplished in many other media including oils, watercolours, gouache, and etching.

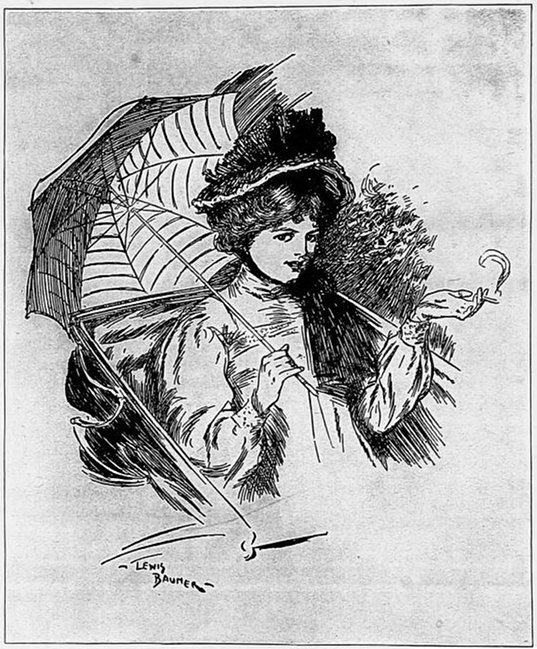
Frontispiece for The Sea Lady by H.G. Wells

Baumer was born at St John's Wood, London, England, and educated at University College School, Gower Street. He studied first in 1887 at the St John's Wood Art School under A. A. Calderon, then at the Royal Academy of Arts July 1890 to July 1895, and at the Royal College of Art. His first drawings appeared in the Pall Mall magazine in 1893; in 1897, his first cartoon in Punch appeared. In 1921, he was elected a member of the Royal Institute of Painters in Water Colours. His work was part of the art competitions at the 1928 Summer Olympics and the 1932 Summer Olympics.

== List of works ==
Books illustrated by Lewis Baumer include:

- Cousin Isabel - Marion Andrews (Wells Gardner Darton, 1892)
- Minor Dialogues – W P Ridge (Macmillan, 1895)
- Jumbles – Lewis Baumer (Pearson, 1897)
- Hoodie – Mrs Molesworth (Chambers, 1897)
- Elsie’s Magician – Fred Whishaw (Chambers, 1897)
- Hermy: The Story Of A Little Girl – Mrs Molesworth (Chambers, 1898)
- The Story Of The Treasure Seekers: Being The Adventures Of The Bastable Children In Search Of A Fortune – E. Nesbit (T. Fisher Unwin, 1899)
- The Three Witches – Mrs Molesworth (Chambers, 1900)
- Peter Piper's Feepshow, Or All The Fun Of The Fair – S. H. Hamer (1900), illustrated by Baumer and Harry B. Neilson
- The Girl With The Feet Of Clay – E Turner (Long, 1900)
- My-Pretty And Her Little Brother “Too” And Other Stories – Mrs Molesworth (Chambers, 1901)
- The Blue Baby And Other Stories – Mrs Molesworth (Chambers, 1901)
- Jerry-Dodds, Millionaire – H Barrow-North (Chambers, 1901)
- Miss Bouverie – Mrs Molesworth (Chambers, 1901)
- The Squire’s Little Girl – L T Meade (Chambers, 1902)
- The Sea Lady – H G Wells (Appleton, 1902)
- Arms And The Woman: A Romance – Harold MacGrath (Pearson, 1903)
- The Manor School – L T Meade (Chambers, 1903)
- Did You Ever? Verses and Pictures – Lewis Baumer (Chambers, 1903)
- Mrs Pritchard’s School – L. T. Meade (Chambers, 1904)
- The New Treasure Seekers – E Nesbit (Fisher Unwin, 1904)
- A Bevy Of Girls – L T Meade (Chambers, 1905)
- The Boys and I: A Child’s Story For Children – Mrs Molesworth (Chambers)
- The Hill-Top Girl – L T Meade (Chambers, 1905)
- The Bolted Door and Other Stories - Mrs Molesworth (Chambers, 1906)
- The Lady Noggs, Peeress – E Jepson (Fisher Unwin, 1906)
- A Girl From America – L T Meade (Chambers, 1907)
- Sporting Days. A Book for Visitors and House Parties – H J Savory (Dent, 1907)*
- The Last Ride Together, and Other Poems – Robert Browning (Foulis, 1908)
- The Young Columbine – D Deakin (Methuen, 1908)
- The Rainbow Book: Tales Of Fun And Fantasy - M. H. Spielmann & Others (Chatto & Windus, 1909) [The Gamekeeper’s Daughter]
- Barbara Bellamy: A Public School Girl – May Baldwin (Chambers, 1909)
- Deportmental Ditties And Other Verses – Harry Graham (Mills & Boon, 1909)
- Old Friends And New - Mrs George de Horne Vaisey (Hodder, 1909)
- A Wild Irish Girl – E T Meade (Chambers, 1910)
- Easter Bells: A Book Of Hope And Gladness – May Byron (Hodder & Stoughton, 1910)
- Canned Classics, and Other Verses – Harry Graham (Mills & Boon, 1911)
- Cherry Ripe and Other Famous Lyrics (1911)
- The Gift of Love (Ed. A. H. Hyatt) (Foulis, 1910)
- Dickens’ Dream Children – M A Dickens (Raphael Tuck)
- For Dear Dad – E T Meade (1911)
- The Perfect Gentleman: A Guide To Social Aspirants (Compiled from The Occasional Papers of Reginald Drake Biffin) – Harry Graham (Arnold, 1912)
- Vanity Fair – William Makepeace Thackeray (Hodder & Stoughton, 1913)
- The Complete Sportsman (Compiled From The Occasional Papers Of Reginald Drake Biffin) – Harry Graham (Arnold, 1912)
- Jim’s Children: A Tale of Town, Country and Canal – T Wilson (Blackie, 1912)
- The Motley Muse: Rhymes For The Times – Harry Graham (Arnold, 1913)
- An Elegy On The Death Of A Mad Dog (Adapted from Goldsmith by F. Norton) (Warne, 1914)
- The Lighter Side of School Life – Ian Hay (Foulis, 1914)
- The Blinded Soldiers and Sailors Gift Book – Goodchild (Jarrold, 1915)
- Love, The Adventurous – Charles Garvice (Hodder & Stoughton, 1917)
- Old Christmas and Bracebridge Hall – Washington Irving (Constable, 1918)
- The Harlequinade: An Excursion - D C Calthorp & H Granville-Barker (Sidgwick & Jackson, 1918)
- The Misdoings of Micky and Mac – I M Peacocke (Ward Lock, 1919)
- Daddy’s Darling – LET Tiddeman (Chambers, 1921)
- The Shallow End – Ian Hay (Hodder & Stoughton, 1924)
- Silver and Gold: Poems – Enid Blyton (Nelson, 1925)
- The Peace Egg and a Christmas Mumming Play – J H Ewing (SPCK 1928)
- Bright Young Things: A Book of Drawings – Lewis Baumer (Methuen, 1928)
- Practical Pen Drawing – EG Lutz (C Scribner, 1928)
- Winter Sportings – Reginald Arkell (Jenkins, 1929)
- Happy Families – H. Graham (Cape, 1934)
- Ski Fever – J. B. Emtage (Methuen, 1936)
- Topsy Turvy – A P Herbert (Ernest Benn, 1947)
- Adapted from The Dictionary of 20th Century British Book Illustrators – Alan Horne (1994)
