= William Boyle (Irish writer) =

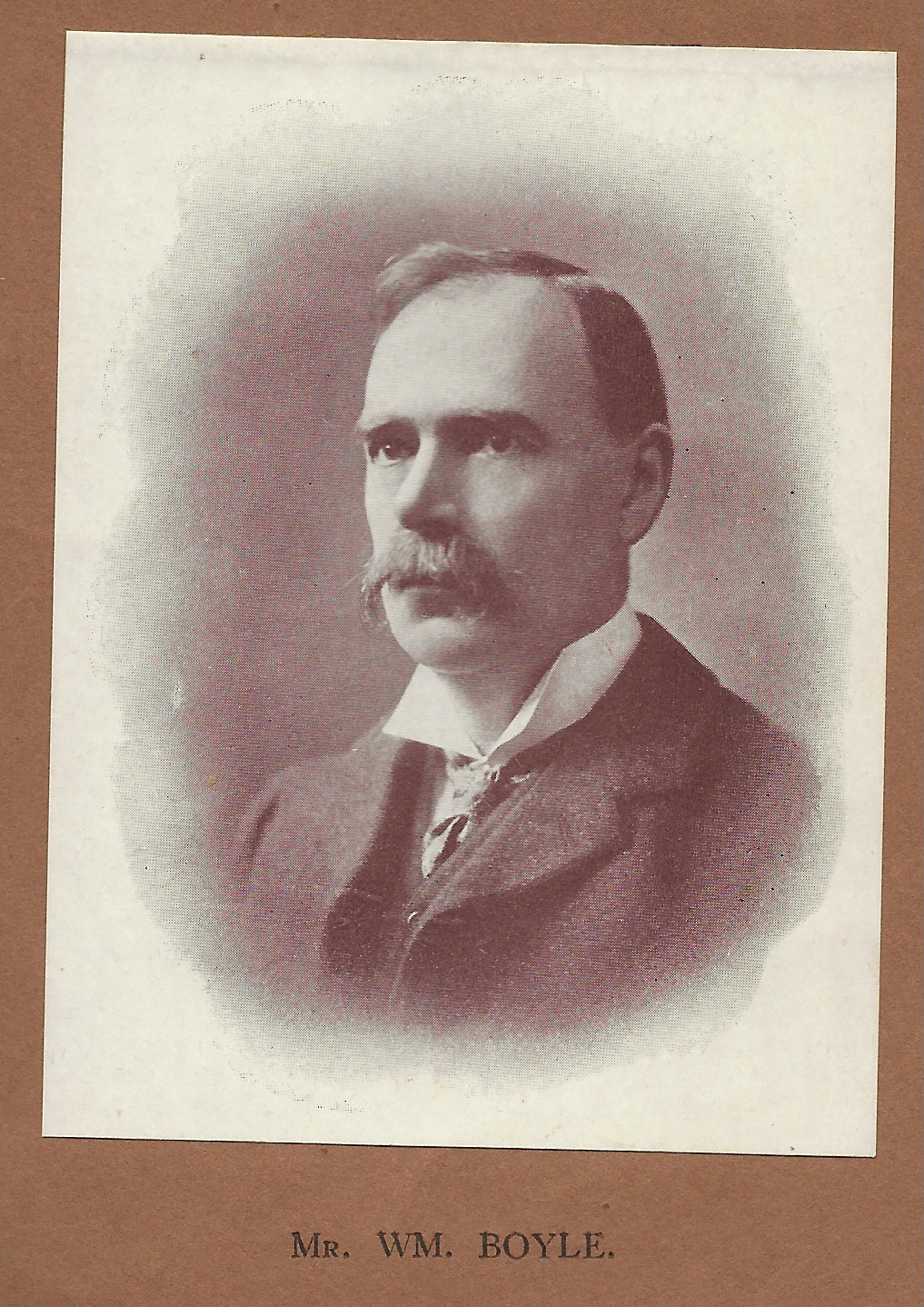
The Irish playwright William Boyle

William Boyle (25 April 1853 – 6 March 1923) was an Irish dramatist and short story writer. His work revolved around the life of the farm people of County Louth, Ireland in the late 19th and early 20th centuries.

Boyle was born in the village of Dromiskin and educated at St Mary's College in Dundalk. He began his career as a teacher but entered the civil service, working in the customs and excise department, and spent his working life in Great Britain. Boyle was a friend of two leading Irish nationalists, Charles Stewart Parnell and John Redmond.

Boyle became a member of the Irish Literary Society, London. He first made a literary name with stories and comic verse for light journals and newspapers. A collection of his short stories, A Kish of Brogues, appeared in 1899. According to Irish literary scholar Norman Jeffares, it showed "his capacity to create character very convincingly."

Becoming a playwright, Boyle wrote five comedies for the Abbey Theatre about the peasant people of Louth. The first three were very successful, according to Robert Hogan, another scholar of Irish literature; they were revived many times in the Abbey.

Norman Jeffares also described Boyle as one of the most popular of the Abbey's early dramatists. Jeffares regarded Boyle's best play as The Building Fund (produced in 1905), "an effective study of avarice." Jeffares added that Boyle treated political trickery in a farcical way in The Eloquent Dempsey, which was produced in 1906, as was The Mineral Workers. The latter got "good dramatic results from placing a returned Irish-American engineer full of modern ideas...up against the locals' resentment of change."

In 1907, at the time of the Playboy Riots, Boyle withdrew his plays from the Abbey, but was encouraged to return by W. B. Yeats and Lady Gregory.

Family Failing (produced in 1912) and Nic (produced in 1916) were less successful—they "lacked the sharpness and energy of his former work."

A more extensive contemporary critique of Boyle's first four plays may be found in Irish Plays and Playwrights (1913) by Cornelius Weygandt.

The catalogue of the National Library of Ireland shows that Boyle wrote a one-act comedy called Tongue-Tied, perhaps around 1920. It also contains a letter from Boyle dated January 1921, in which he declined an invitation to lecture before the National Literary Society because of the state of his health. Boyle died a little over two years later in Dulwich, England.

== Select works ==
- A Kish of Brogues (1899) - short story collection
- Comic Capers, Pictures by H. B. Neilson, Verses by William Boyle (1903, illustrated by Harry B. Neilson)
- Christmas at the Zoo: Described in Verse by William Boyle, with Coloured Illustrations by H. B. Neilson (1904, illustrated by Harry B. Neilson)
- The Building Fund, 1905
- The Eloquent Dempsey, 1906
- The Mineral Workers, 1906
- Family Failing, 1912
- Nic, 1916.
