= Gustav Falke =

German writer

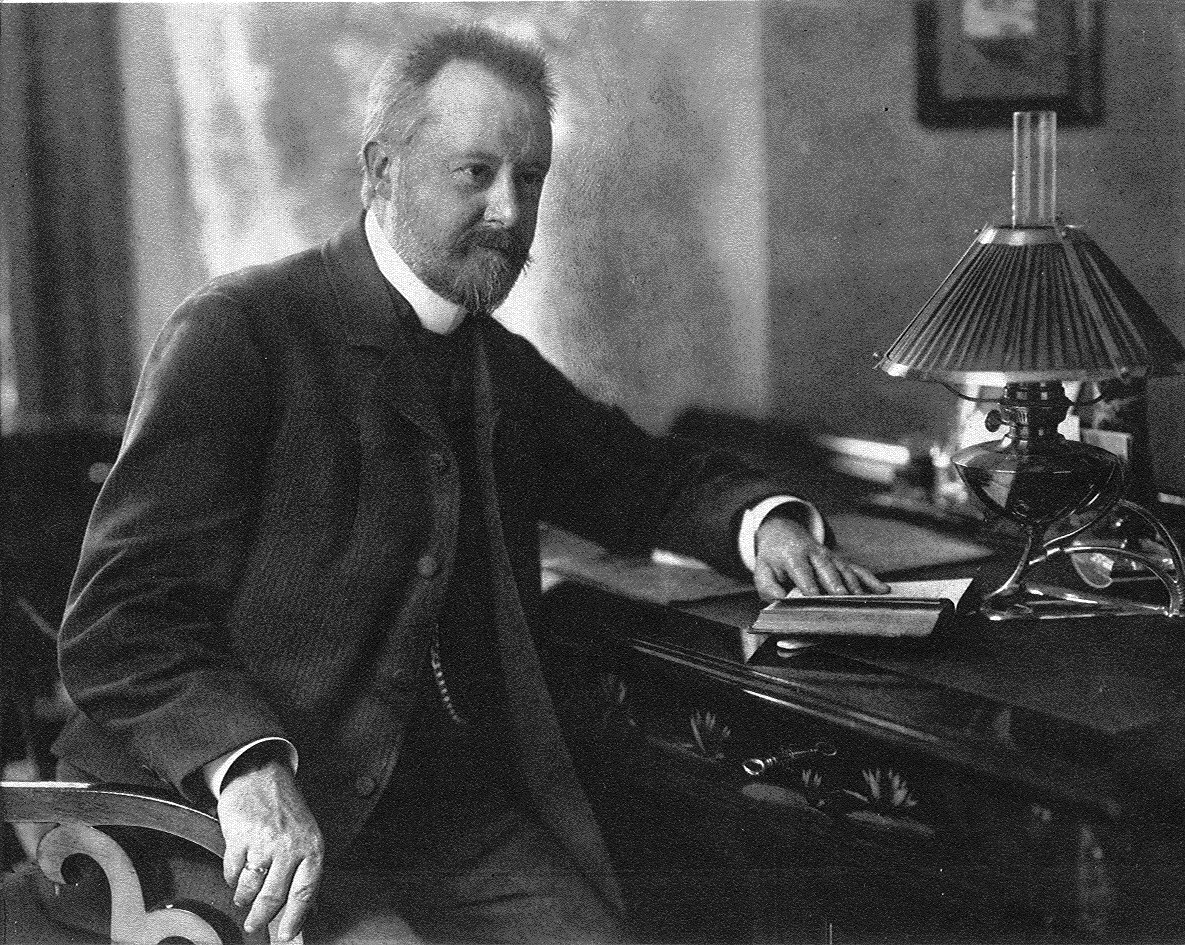
- Gustav Falke, 1905; photograph by Rudolf Dührkoop
- Born: 11 January 1853; Free City of Lübeck
- Died: 8 February 1916 (aged 63); Hamburg, German Empire
- Occupation: writer
- Writing career
- Literary movement: impressionistic lyric poetry

Gustav Falke (11 January 1853 – 8 February 1916) was a German writer.

== Life ==
Falke was born in Lübeck to merchant Johann Friedrich Christian Falke and his wife Elisabeth Franziska Hoyer. The historians Johannes and Jacob von Falke were his uncles, and the translator Otto Falke was his cousin.

He worked in a bookstore in Hamburg from 1868, then moved to Essen, Stuttgart, and Hildburghausen. He returned to Hamburg in 1878, where he was educated in music by Emil Krause, to become a piano teacher. In 1888 he married his former piano student Anna Theen. They had two daughters and a son.

Falke started to publish his works in the 1890s and was introduced into the Hamburg literary society around Otto Ernst, Jakob Loewenberg, Prince Emil von Schoenaich-Carolath, and Detlev von Liliencron. Much of his work was impressionistic lyric poetry inspired by Liliencron, Richard Dehmel, and Paul Heyse. He also wrote conservative, "folk" pieces, following Eduard Mörike and Theodor Storm, and children's books in rhyme and prose. With the advent of World War I, he volunteered to write war propaganda as well, for which he was awarded the Prussian Roter Adlerorden. Composers such as Pauline Volkstein set Falke’s texts to music.

Falke died in Hamburg.

== Works ==
- Aus dem Durchschnitt, Berlin 1892
- Mynheer der Tod und andere Gedichte, Dresden u.a. 1892
- Tanz und Andacht, München 1893
- Harmlose Humoresken, München 1894
- Der Kuß, München 1894
- Zwischen zwei Nächten, Stuttgart 1894
- Landen und Stranden, Berlin
  - 1. Hamburger Kinder, 1895
  - 2. Neben der Arbeit, 1895
  - 3. Hab ich nur deine Liebe, 1901
- Zwei, 1896
- Neue Fahrt, Berlin 1897
- Der Mann im Nebel, Hamburg 1899
- Mit dem Leben, Hamburg 1899
- Gustav Falke als Lyriker, Hamburg 1900
- Vogelbuch, Hamburg 1901 (together with Otto Speckter)
- Katzenbuch, Hamburg 1900 (together with Otto Speckter)
- Hohe Sommertage, Hamburg 1902
- Putzi, Hamburg 1902
- Aus Muckimacks Reich, Hamburg 1903
- Zwischengerichte, Leipzig 1903
- Der gestiefelte Kater, Hamburg 1904
- Ausgewählte Gedichte, Hamburg 1905
- Bübchens Weihnachtstraum. Melodramatisches Krippenspiel. Musik (1906): Engelbert Humperdinck. UA 1906
- Eichendorff, Berlin u.a. 1906
- En Handvull Appeln, Hamburg 1906
- Timm Kröger, Hamburg 1906
- Frohe Fracht, Hamburg 1907
- Heitere Geschichten, Berlin u.a. 1907
- Drei gute Kameraden, Mainz 1908
- Hamburg, Stuttgart u.a. 1908
- Die Kinder aus Ohlsens Gang, Hamburg 1908
- Dörten und andere Erzählungen, Leipzig 1909
- Ein lustig Jahr der Tiere, München 1909 (together with Th. Huggenberger)
- Tierbilder, Mainz (together with Eugen Osswald)
  - 1 (1909)
  - 2 (1909)
- Winter und Frühling, Leipzig 1909
- Die Auswahl, Hamburg 1910
- Geelgösch, Leipzig u.a. 1910
- Klaus Bärlappe, Mainz 1910
- Der Spanier, Berlin 1910
- Drei Helden, Mainz 1911 (together with Arpad Schmidhammer)
- Das Schützenfest. Im Fischerdorf, Reutlingen 1911
- Unruhig steht die Sehnsucht auf, Hamburg u.a.] 1911
- Gesammelte Dichtungen, Hamburg u.a.
  - 1. Herddämmerglück, 1912
  - 2. Tanz und Andacht, 1912
  - 3. Der Frühlingsreiter, 1912
  - 4. Der Schnitter, 1912
  - 5. Erzählende Dichtungen, 1912
- Herr Henning oder Die Tönniesfresser von Hildesheim, Leipzig 1912
- Die neidischen Schwestern, Berlin 1912
- Der Schnitter, Hamburg 1912
- Die Stadt mit den goldenen Türmen, Berlin 1912
- Anna, Hamburg 1913
- Herr Purtaller und seine Tochter, Mainz 1913
- Kunterbunt, Mainz 1914 (together with Eugen Osswald)
- Vaterland heilig Land, Leipzig 1915
- Viel Feind, viel Ehr, Leipzig 1915
- Das Leben lebt, Berlin 1916

=== Translations ===
- Holger Drachmann: Verschrieben, Leipzig 1904 (translated together with Julia Koppel)
- John Brymer mit Zeichnungen von Stewart Orr: Zwei lustige Seeleute, Köln am Rhein 1905 Original: Two Merry Mariners

=== Editor ===
- Steht auf ihr lieben Kinderlein, Köln 1906 (published together with Jakob Loewenberg)
- Friedrich Hebbel: Meine Kindheit, Hamburg 1903
- Das Büchlein Immergrün, Cöln 1903
- Kriegsdichtungen, Hamburg
  - 1. Hoch, Kaiser und Reich!, 1914
  - 2. Unsere Helden, 1915
  - 3. Wir und Österreich, 1915
  - 4. Zu Wasser und zu Lande, 1915
  - 5. Feinde ringsum, 1915
  - 6. Von Feld zu Feld, 1915
  - 7. Fern vom Krieg, 1916
  - 8. Zum blutig frohen Reigen, 1917

== Literature ==
=== German language ===
- Oscar Ludwig Brandt: Gustav Falke. Enoch Verlag, Hamburg 1917.
- Friedrich Castelle: Gustav Falke. Ein deutscher Lyriker. Hesse und Becker, Leipzig 1909.
- Joachim Müller (ed.): Die Akten Gustav Falke und Max Dauthendey, Aufbau-Verlag, Berlin 1970 (Aus dem Archiv der Deutschen Schillerstiftung; 15/16)
- Kurt Oppert: Gustav Falke. Darstellung seiner Persönlichkeit und Formanalyse seiner Gedichte nach allgemeinen Gesichtspunkten und im Vergleich zu andersartiger Lyrik. Dissertation, Universität, Bonn 1925.
- Jens Resühr: Verskunstprobleme in der Lyrik Gustav Falkes. Hamburg 1967.
- Ernst Ludwig Schellenberg: Gustav Falke. Verlag für Literatur, Kunst und Musik, Leipzig 1908 (Beiträge zur Literaturgeschichte; H. 55)
- Heinrich Spiero: Gustav Falke. Ein Lebensbild. Westermann, Braunschweig 1928.
- Gerhard Steiner: Stille Dächer, zarte Liebe. Die Jugendzeit des Dichters Gustav Falke in Hildburghausen. Verlag Frankenschwelle Salier, Hildburghausen 1994, ISBN 3-86180-024-1.
