= Penny Illustrated Paper =

Defunct London weekly newspaper

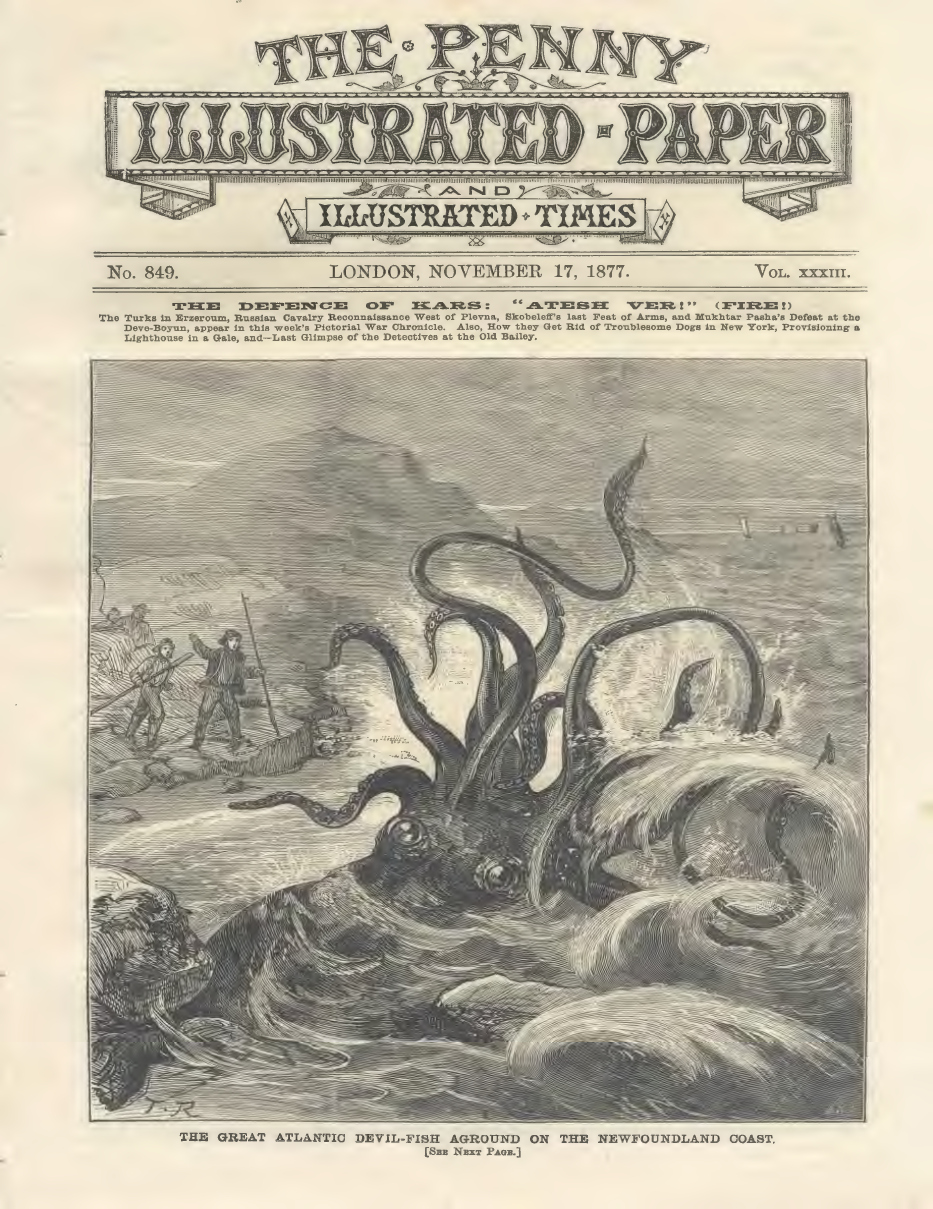
Cover of 17 November 1877 issue, showing a giant squid found washed ashore, alive, in Newfoundland

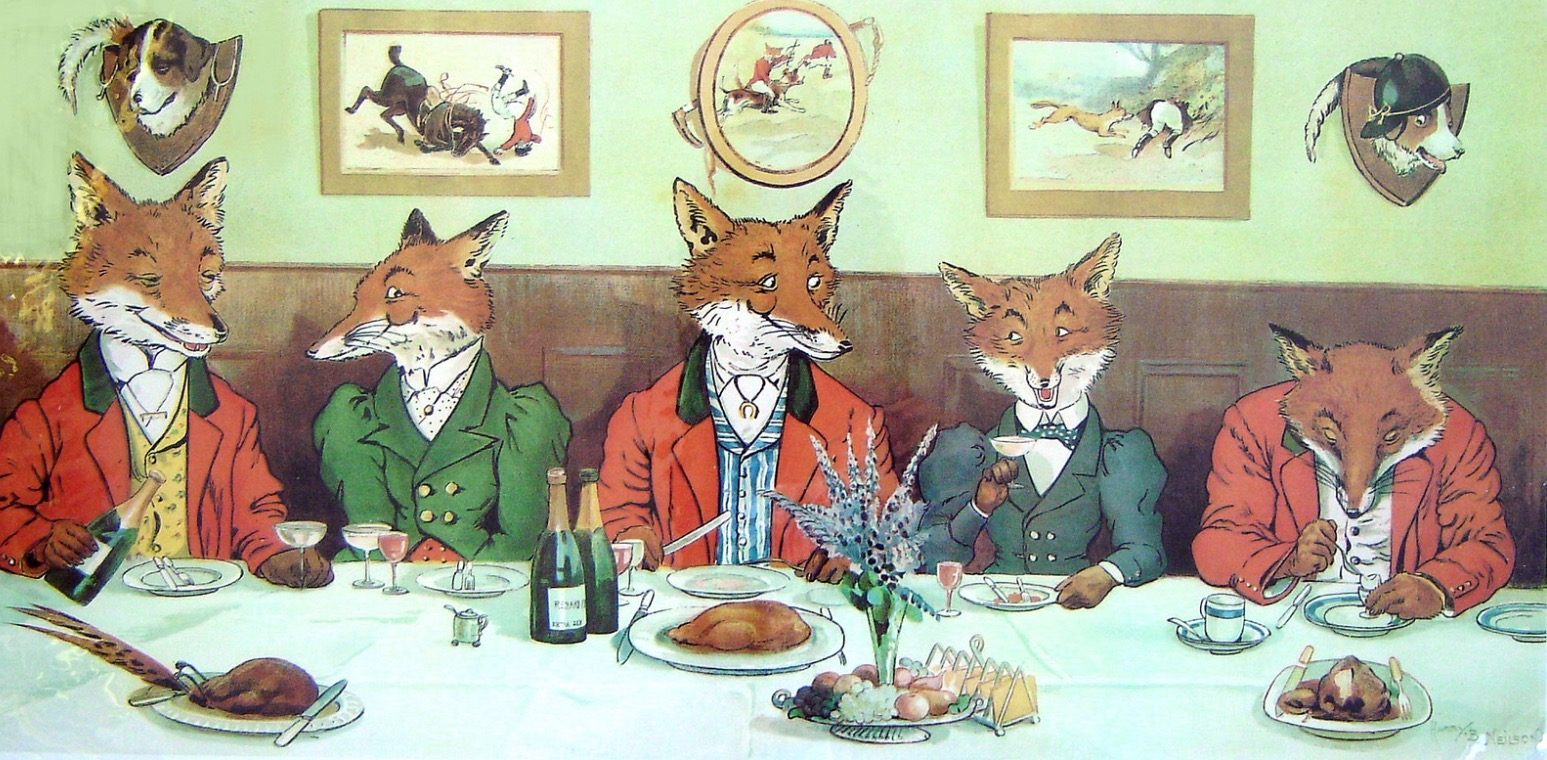
Mr Fox's Hunt Breakfast on Xmas Day, December 1897

The Penny Illustrated Paper and Illustrated Times was a cheap (1d.) illustrated London weekly newspaper that ran from 1861 to 1913.

== Premises ==
Illustrated weekly newspapers had been pioneered by the Illustrated London News (published from 1842, costing fivepence): its imitators included the Pictorial Times (1843–48), and – after the 1855 repeal of the Stamp Act – the Illustrated Times.

With the abolition of paper duty in 1861 it was possible to envisage an even cheaper mass-circulation illustrated weekly.

== History ==
The first issue, 12 October 1861, announced itself confidently under the masthead "PENNY ILLUSTRATED PAPER: With All the News of the Week": "A new era opens upon the people. In producing a paper for the million, let us plainly say, we want be esteemed the friend of the people ... A new era is opened to us by the Repeal of the Paper Duties".

The paper was apparently initially the charge of Ebenezer Farrington, but the wife and sons of the recently deceased Herbert Ingram, proprietors of the Illustrated London News, also seem to have been behind the venture.

A well-known work by Harry B. Neilson, Mr Fox's Hunt Breakfast on Xmas Day, was created for issuing as a chromolithograph with the Christmas edition of the Penny Illustrated Paper in December 1897.

The weekly newspaper ceased publication in 1913.
