= Helen Grace Culverwell Marsh-Lambert =

HGC Marsh-Lambert
- with her husband
- Born: Helen Grace Culverwell Marsh; 1888; Bristol
- Died: 1981 (aged 92–93)
- Other name: Gracie
- Occupations: writer and illustrator
- Known for: Children's books
- Spouse: Charles Lambert

Helen Grace Culverwell Marsh-Lambert or HGC Marsh-Lambert (1888 – 1981) was a British writer and illustrator of children's books and postcards.

== Life ==
Marsh-Lambert was born in Bristol in 1881. In 1911 she was living with her parents and she was already a successful illustrator. She was known as "Gracie". She married a banker named Charles T. Lambert in 1913.

She died in 1981.

== Works ==
- My Big Bedtime book
- Jack and Jill's Bedtime Story Book
- Story of Little Blackie
- The story of Teddy Bear
