= Sam Hield Hamer =

English writer and editor

Sam Hield Hamer (27 July 1869 – 6 February 1941) was an English writer and editor, mostly for children, but was also well-regarded as a travel writer.

Born in Islington, a son of John Hamer, a Justice of the Peace, and Sarah Sharp Hamer (née Heaton), a writer, the young Sam was educated at the City of London School. In 1886, at the time of the real general election in July, the school conducted a mock election, and the boys voted for a Liberal government to be led by Hamer. He left school that year to take up a position with the publishers Cassell and Company, where he rose to join the editorial staff and stayed with the firm until 1907, serving as editor of Little Folks from 1895 to 1907. He was a member of the National Liberal Club. He is credited with "discovering" Arthur Rackham as an illustrator.

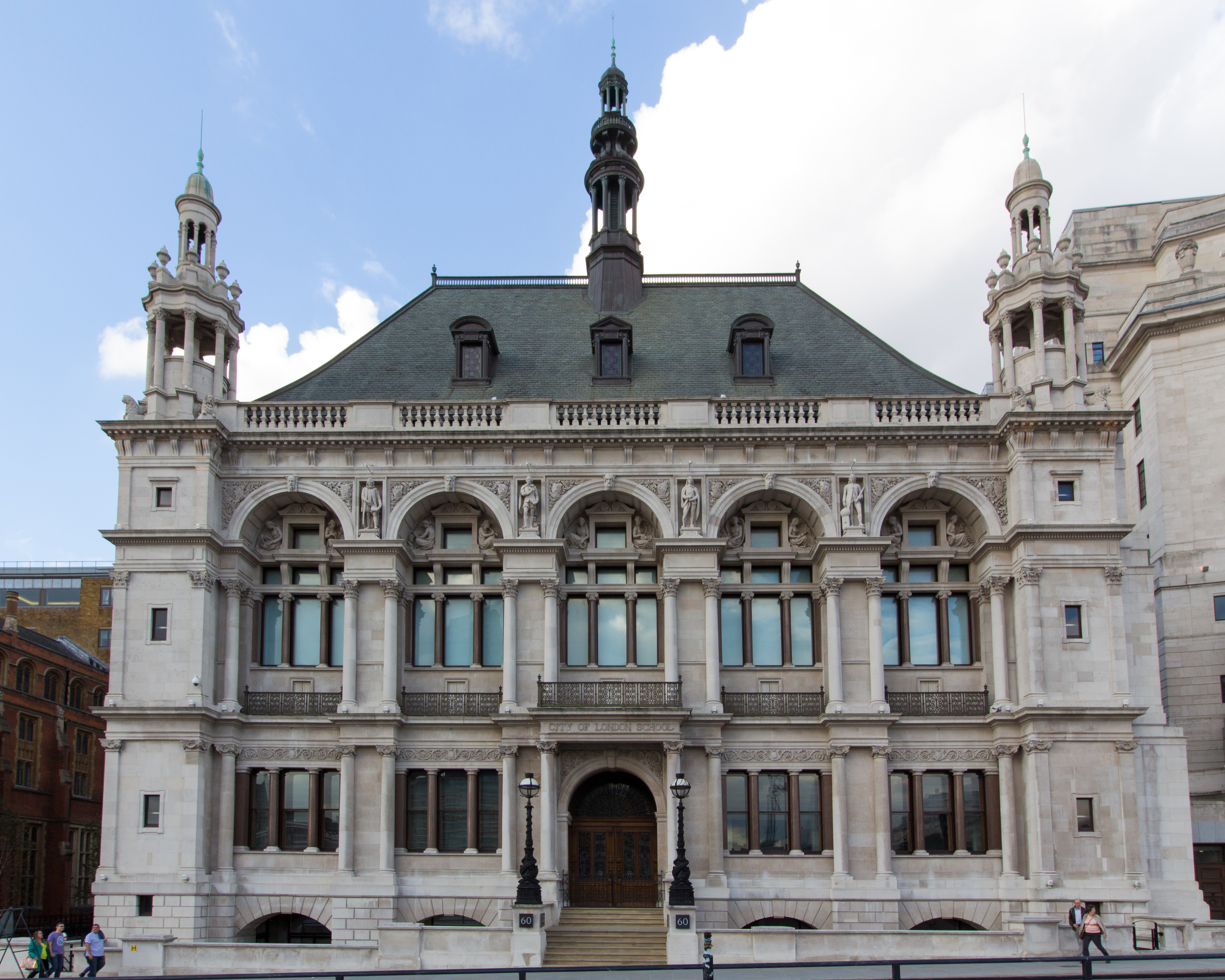
The home of the City of London School in Hamer's time

He also wrote under the name of Sam Browne.

Between 1897 and 1906 Hamer had a productive collaboration with the illustrator Harry B. Neilson.

Hamer's book The Dolomites (1910), also known as Wayfaring in the Dolomites, is about the mountain-climbing adventures of a family called Innerkofler.

Hamer was committed to saving British landscape and heritage sites, and was secretary of the National Trust for 23 years, from 1911 – 1934. He was responsible for raising the money needed (£35,000) for the Trust to buy the land surrounding Stonehenge. It was reported that, during the time that he was secretary, the number of National Trust properties increased from 40 to 250.

In 1913, a reviewer of his The Bran Pie commented that Hamer "probably understands the taste of children in literature as well as anyone now living." He corresponded with Beatrix Potter in the 1920s.

Hamer, then of 69 Dartmouth Park Hill, Tufnell Park, Middlesex, died at the neighbouring number 55 Dartmouth Park Hill on 6 February 1941, leaving effects valued at £109. Probate was to Frances Mary Hamer, spinster.

== Selected publications ==
- S. H. Hamer, Micky Magee's Menagerie, or, Strange animals and their doings, illustrated by Harry B. Neilson (Cassell & Company, London, Paris, New York & Melbourne, 1897)
- S. H. Hamer, Whys and Other Whys, or, Curious Creatures and Their Tales, illustrated by Harry B. Neilson (London: Cassell, 1898)
- S. H. Hamer, Harry B. Neilson, Topsy-Turvy Tales, or The Exception Proves the Rule (London: Cassell, 1901)
- S. H. Hamer, The Jungle School; or Dr. Jibber-Jabber Burchall's Academy, With Illustrations by H. B. Neilson (London: Cassell, 1900)
- S. H. Hamer, Peter Piper's Feepshow, with Illustrations by H. B. Neilson and Lewis Baumer (London: Cassell & Company, 1900)
- S. H. Hamer, The Ten Travellers, and other tales in prose and verse, illustrated by H. B. Neilson (Cassell & Company, London, Paris, New York & Melbourne, 1902)
- S. H. Hamer, Harry Rountree, Archibald's Amazing Adventure, Or, The Tip-top Tale (London: Cassell and Company, Limited, 1905)
- [S. H. Hamer] Cassell's Fairy Tale Series, 5 vols. (London: Cassell and Company, [1905])
- S. H. Hamer, Topsy Turvy Tales, with Illustrations by Harry B. Neilson (1906)
- S. H. Hamer, The Forst Foundling (London: Duckworth and Company, 1909)
- Sam Hield Hamer, The Dolomites (London: Methuen, 1910)
- S. H. Hamer, The Bran Pie (Duckworth, 1913)
- S. H. Hamer, Escuela de Animales, illustrado por Harry B. Neilson (Barcelona: Ramon Sopena, 1942)
