= Vojtěchov =

Vojtěchov may refer to places in the Czech Republic:

- Vojtěchov (Chrudim District), a municipality and village in the Pardubice Region
- Vojtěchov, a village and part of Lísek in the Vysočina Region
- Vojtěchov (Mšeno), a village and part of Mšeno in the Central Bohemian Region
