= Eugen Wratislaw von Mittrowitz =

Austrian and Czech field marshal

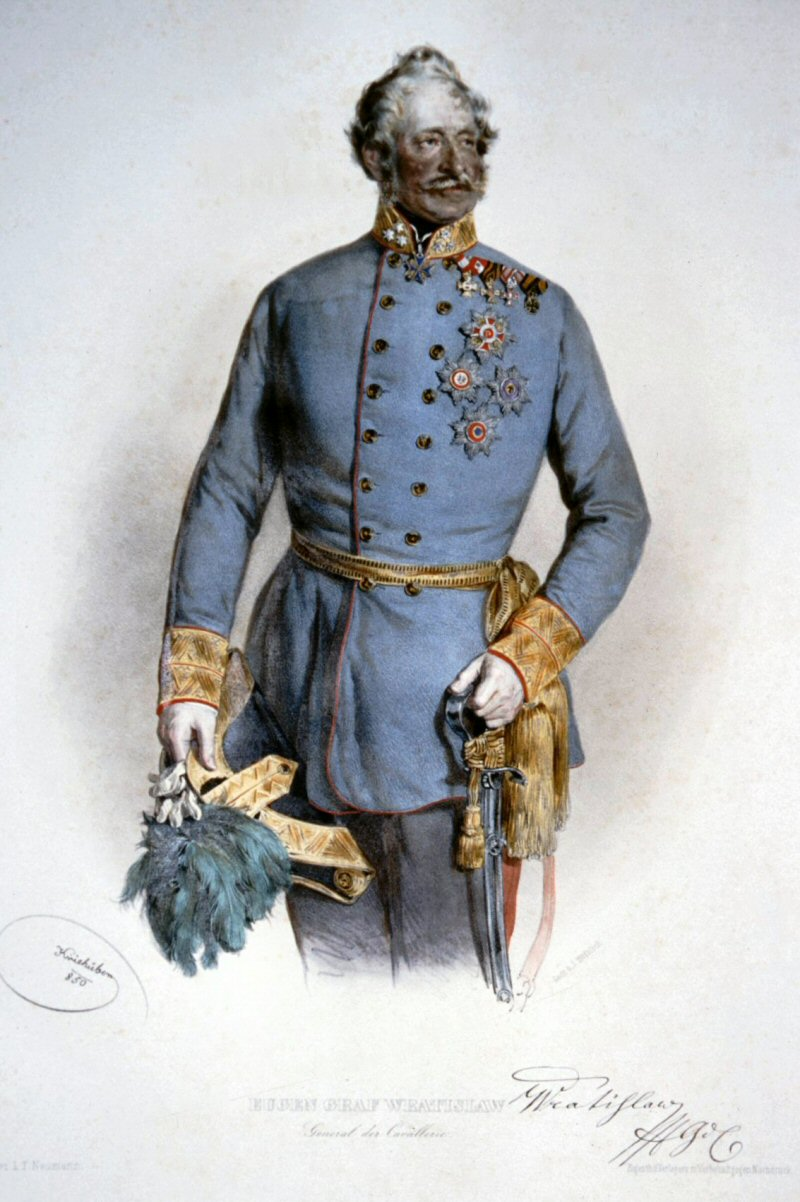
Eugen Wratislaw; lithography by Joseph Kriehuber

Eugen Wratislaw von Mittrowitz-Nettolitzky (8 July 1786 – 14 February 1867) was an Austrian and Czech Field Marshal, a member of the Wratislaw of Mitrovice family.

He was born on 8 July 1786 in Vlčí Pole (now part of Dolní Bousov), Bohemia. He joined the army in 1804 and fought in the 1805–1809 and 1813–1816 campaigns. He became a Colonel in 1820, a Major General in 1830 and Fieldmarshal-Lieutenant and member of the Hofkriegsrat in 1835. In 1848 he commanded the first Armeekorps in Italy, and became Cavalry-General in 1849 and Field marshal in 1854. He was Chancellor of the Military Order of Maria Theresa in 1855. He died on 14 February 1867 in Vienna.
