= Teodora Krajewska =

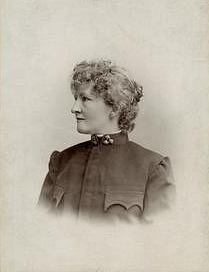
- Krajewska in 1896
- Born: Teodora Kosmowska; 1854; Warsaw, Congress Poland, Russian Empire
- Died: 5 September 1935 (aged 80–81); Warsaw, Poland
- Resting place: Powązki Cemetery, Warsaw
- Education: University of Geneva
- Occupations: physician, writer, teacher
- Spouse: Antoni Krajewski (1876–1880, his death)
- Parents: Ignacy Kosmowski (father); Seweryna Główczyńska (mother)

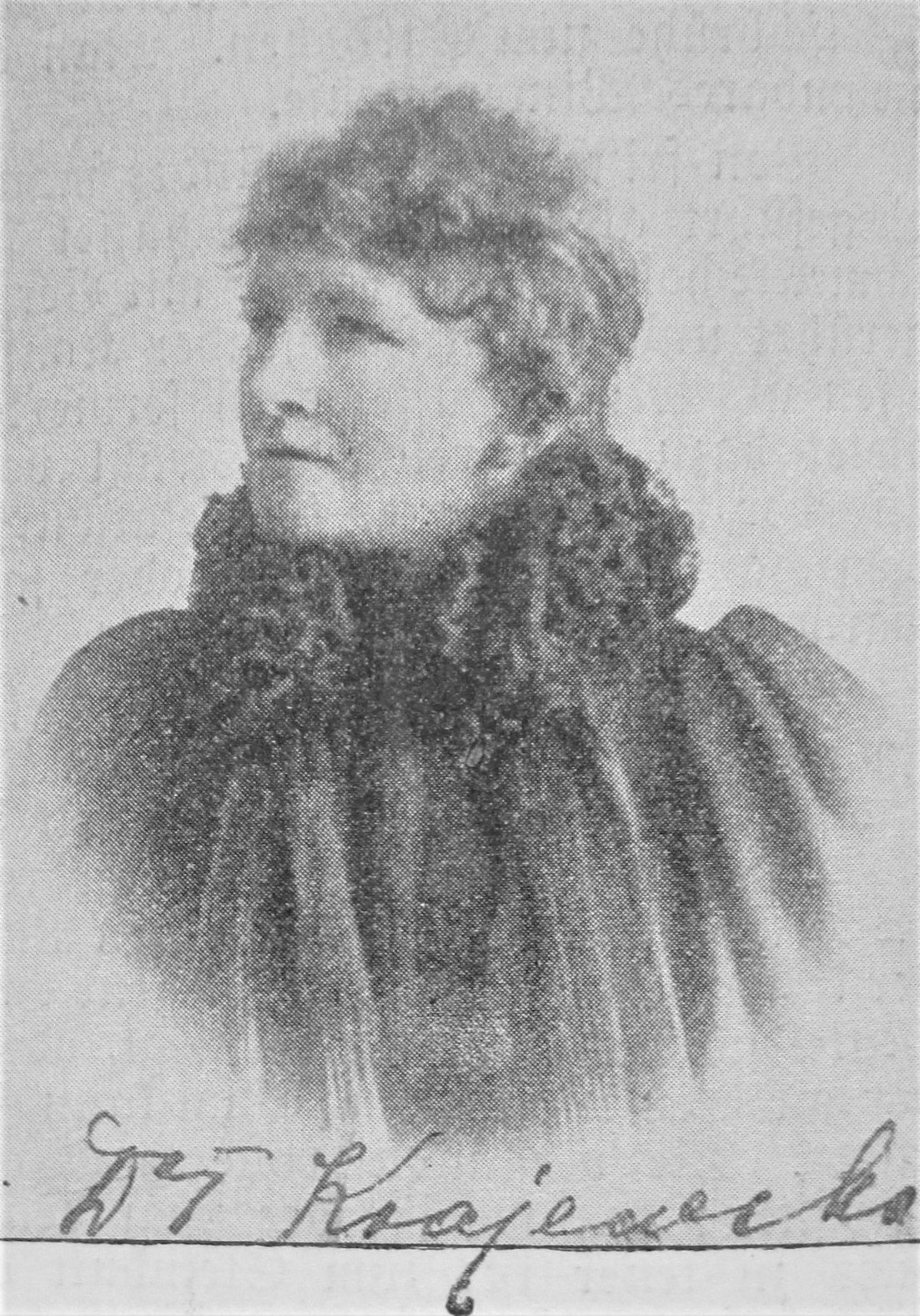
Theodora Krajewska, 1854–1935

Teodora Krajewska (née Kosmowska, Germanized as Theodora; 1854–1935) was a Polish physician, writer and teacher active in Austria-Hungary.

In her youth, Krajewska worked in schools and wrote novels. She surprised her family by moving to Switzerland to study medicine in 1883. In 1892, she was hired by the authorities of Austria-Hungary to work as a public health official in Bosnia and Herzegovina. One of the first women to practice medicine in Bosnia and Herzegovina and Austria-Hungary, Krajewska mainly treated Bosnian Muslim women, whom she regarded as susceptible to particular health problems. Krajewska wrote detailed notes about the state of women and Muslim customs. These writings, published in 1989, reveal the patronizing attitude towards Muslims that was common for the era. Krajewska stayed in Bosnia after the collapse of Austria-Hungary but the loss of eyesight forced her to retire in 1922. In 1928, she moved back to Warsaw, a decision she regretted, where she died.

Teodora is currently buried in the Powązki Cemetery under plot #175-2-2.

== Family and education ==
Teodora Kosmowska was born to an intelligentsia family in Warsaw, then part of Russian Poland. Her father, Ignacy, worked at school, while her mother, Seweryna (née Główczyńska), brought up the couple's eight daughters. The family were friends with the Skłodowskis, whose daughter Maria played with the Kosmowski daughters. After graduating from Warsaw's prestigious girls' gymnasium, Teodora Kosmowska passed her teacher's exam and started teaching arithmetic to gymnasium students. She quit her job in 1876, when she married Ignacy Krajewski, a professor of classical philology. The couple entertained various members of the intelligentsia at their home, including the writer Aleksander Świętochowski and the Skłodowskis. These contacts influenced Krajewska to start writing novels, poems, and literature reviews, as well as to translate.

The turning point in Krajewska's life was the death of her husband in 1881. She at first resumed her teaching career, working in a private gymnasium run by her aunts, Leokadia and Bronislawa Kosmowska, and continued writing novels. Young Polish widows at the time were expected to remarry, but Krajewska defied both the social norm and her parents' wishes. She left Warsaw in 1883, travelled to Switzerland and enrolled in the University of Geneva. Krajewska first studied physiology, becoming the first female teaching assistant in the university's history, and then took up medicine. She was actively involved in the activities of the Polish diaspora in Switzerland, serving as the president of the Association of Polish Students.

Krajewska passed her final exams in 1891 and received an award for her doctoral dissertation the following year, but found that she could not obtain the nostrification of her diploma or practice medicine in her homeland. It thus did not take her much thought to respond to the notice of the Austro-Hungarian authorities, who were looking for female physicians to work in the newly occupied Bosnia and Herzegovina.

== Medical career ==
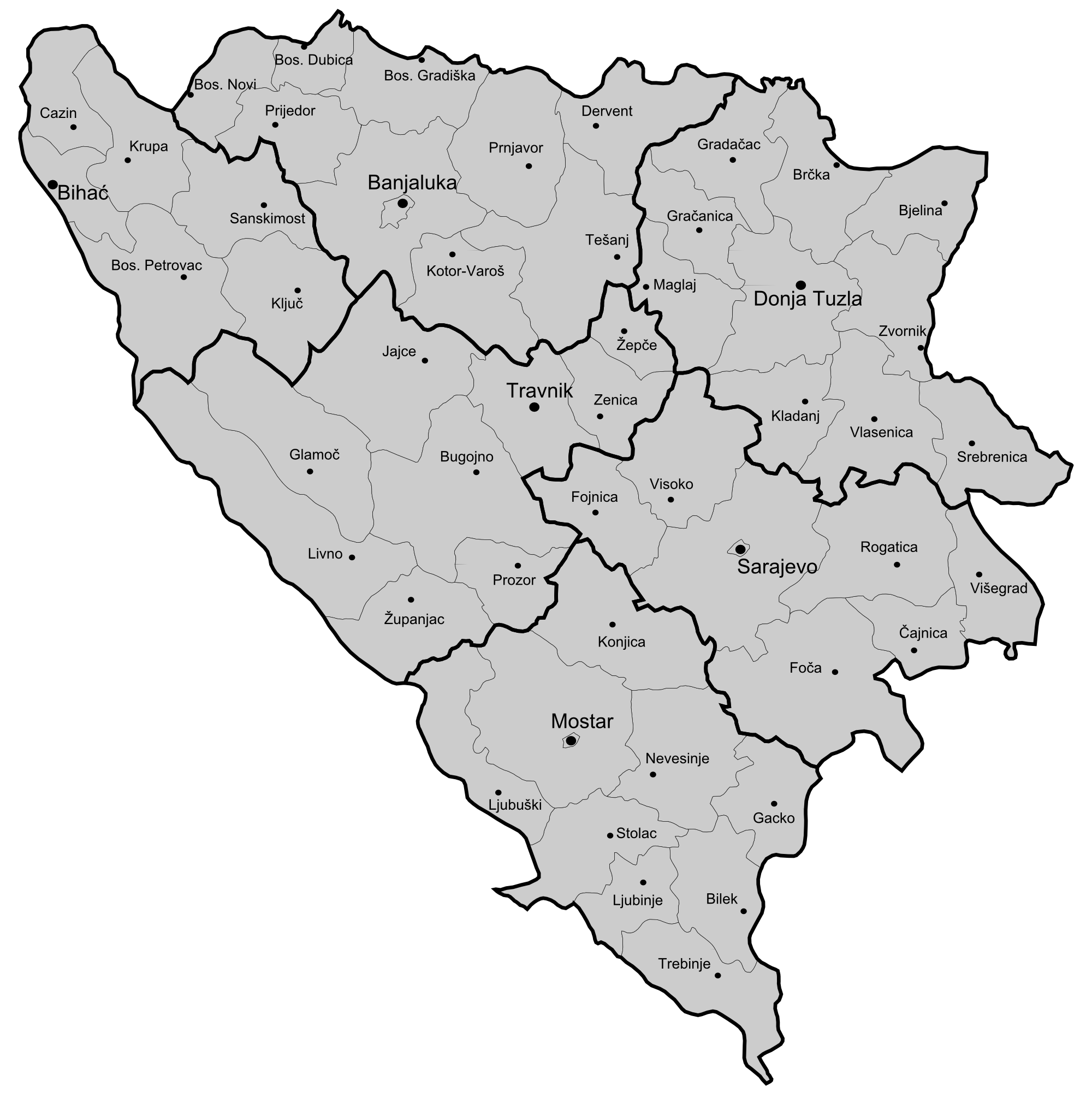
Austro-Hungarian districts of Bosnia and Herzegovina. Krajewska was first responsible for the towns in the district of Tuzla and then for those in the district of Sarajevo.

Teodora Krajewska was named the public health official (Amtärztin) of the District of Tuzla with the rank of captain by the decree of 28 November 1892. In order to perform obstetric and gynecological procedures, she undertook training in a clinic in Vienna. Women could not study or practice medicine in Austria-Hungary at the time, but exceptions had to be made for Bosnia and Herzegovina, where Muslim women refused to be treated by male physicians. Krajewska was thus not only one of the first female physicians in Bosnia and Herzegovina but in Austria-Hungary as well. Seven women in total were employed to treat Bosnian women; Krajewska was one of the three Russian citizens and one of the two ethnic Poles. Before assuming her office, Krajewska had to take Austro-Hungarian citizenship. She succeeded Anna Bayerová, a Czech, who had resigned shortly after her appointment due to frequent disagreements with her military superiors. Bayerová was unwilling to care predominantly for Bosnian Muslim women, as her superiors had expected, while Krajewska embraced the task.

Krajewska's arrival in Tuzla in March 1893 was announced by the town crier. She was dismayed to find "these marvellous Slavic women covered by veils". Krajewska learned Serbo-Croatian quickly. She usually rode a Bosnian pony on her visits to remote mountain villages but had to travel by foot when the winters were too severe for the horse. The demand for Krajewska's services was such that the Austro-Hungarian authorities soon employed Bohuslava Kecková, another Pole, who took up post in Mostar. Speaking at the 1896 International Congress of Women in Berlin, Krajewska defended colonialism by arguing that Bosnians and Herzegovinians needed "civilization and progress from the outside", imposed "from above". The imperial feminism espoused by Krajewska was rejected by Austrian women's movements, which had a liberal outlook.

Krajewska was particularly interested in osteomalacia. She published a detailed article about it in 1900, claiming, on the basis of only 50 cases, that the disorder was endemic among Muslim women living in the mountains of Tuzla District. According to Krajewska, Christian women were never afflicted. She blamed "damp climate", "lack of sun", poverty, malnutrition, and "Muslim customs" (chiefly child marriage, seclusion, veiling, excessive libido of Muslim men, overly frequent pregnancies, and prolonged breastfeeding) for the supposedly endemic osteomalacia.

In 1901, Krajewska was moved to Sarajevo, with Jadwiga Olszewska replacing her in Tuzla. As the public health official of the District of Sarajevo, she regularly traveled to the towns of Foča, Fojnica, Goražde, Vareš, and Visoko. In addition to practicing medicine, Krajewska taught hygiene in several Sarajevo schools. While doing so, she met another teacher and writer, Jagoda Truhelka, with whom she developed a close friendship. She also formed friendships with native Bosnians, favoring Croats but also including "progressive Muslims"; she disliked Serbs due to their perceived Russophilia. The backbone of her contacts, however, was formed by foreigners who had, like herself, flocked to Bosnia and Herzegovina during the Austro-Hungarian rule.

== Retirement ==
The First World War, triggered by the assassination of Archduke Franz Ferdinand several hundred meters away from Krajewska's home in Sarajevo in 1914, ended the Austro-Hungarian rule in Bosnia and Herzegovina. While the majority of the upper class Poles in Bosnia and Herzegovina moved to the newly established Second Polish Republic, Krajewska stayed. Her eyesight deteriorated during the war due to cataracts; a surgical intervention in Prague was unsuccessful. By 1922, she had to retire.

After years of living alone with her cat, Krajewska decided to leave "the country and the people she knew and loved". She returned to Warsaw, now capital of Poland, in 1927. She found that the city had changed immensely and she did not feel at home there anymore. She had been one of the best known and most respected people in Sarajevo, but only an anonymous old woman in Warsaw. With her sisters and their children living in southern Poland and her friends in Bosnia, Krajewska felt lonely and bitter. Already frail and almost completely blind, she undertook a strenuous journey to see Bosnia for the last time before dying in Warsaw on 5 September 1935.

== Diary ==
Krajewska left behind numerous reports and a detailed diary. In her old age, Krajewska entrusted these writings to her friend Zofia Grabowska. Krajewska's nephew, Zbigniew Danielak, edited her diary and had it published in Poland in 1989. The original manuscript is kept in the Ossolineum. Parts of it were translated into Serbo-Croatian by the Bosnian writer Marina Trumić, who died before she could finish.

Krajewska's detailed reports of her impressions of Muslim customs reflect the Orientalist stereotypes common in the era. She insisted that the Muslims of Bosnia and Herzegovina were less intelligent and less civilized than their Christian compatriots. Judging various nations and ethnicities by the progressiveness of their respective national movements, Krajewska classified Serbs as "extraordinarily intelligent", Croats as "average", and Bosnian Muslims as a "superfluous and foreign element". Reports of her colleagues in Bosnia and Herzegovina, including Bohuslava Kecková, contradicted Krajewska's writings and denied the correlation between religious affiliation and intelligence.

== Bibliography ==
- Deutscher Hausschatz, 1899/1900, vol. 26, No. 19, p. 340: Portrait with signature Dr T Krajewska.
- Fuchs, Brigitte (January 2017). "Austria-Hungary's Civilizing Mission in Bosnia and its Positive Effects on Domestic Feminists' Demands 1890–1918". University of Cologne.
- Fuchs, Brigitte (2011). Christian Promitzer; Marius Turda (eds.). Orientalizing Disease – Austro-Hungarian Policies of 'Race', Gender and Hygiene in Bosnia and Herzegovina 1874–1914. Central European University Press. ISBN 978-9639776821.
