= Anna Honzáková =

Czech medical doctor (1875–1940)

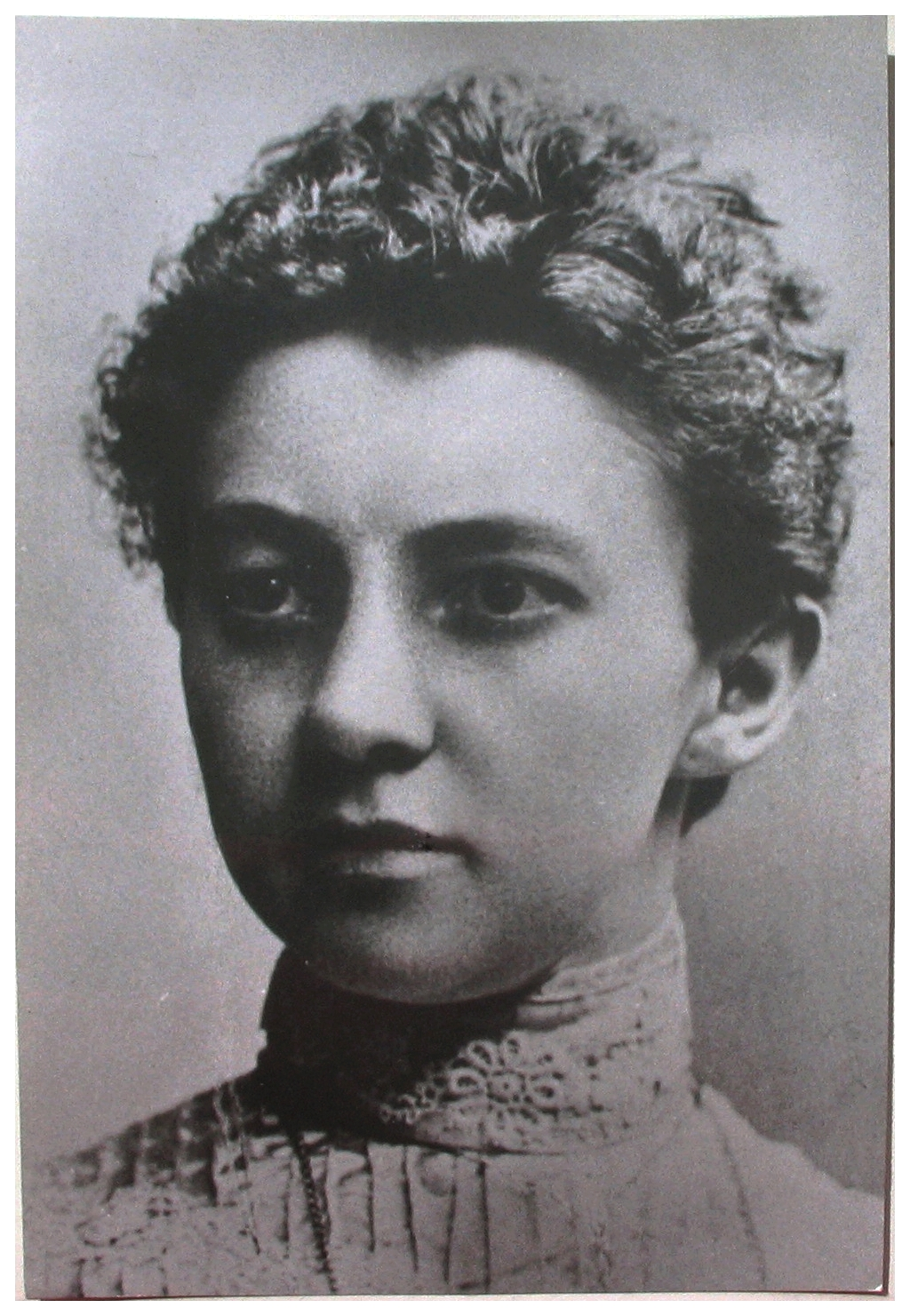
- Honzáková in 1902
- Born: 16 November 1875; Kopidlno, Bohemia, Austria-Hungary
- Died: 13 October 1940 (aged 64); Prague, Protectorate of Bohemia and Moravia
- Education: Charles-Ferdinand University
- Occupation: Gynecologist
- Known for: First female medical doctor to graduate from Charles-Ferdinand University

Anna Honzáková (16 November 1875 – 13 October 1940) was a Czech medical doctor. She was the first female medical doctor to graduate from the Charles-Ferdinand University in Prague, which she did on 17 March 1902.

She was also the third Czech woman to earn a doctor's certificate, although the first two, Bohuslava Kecková (graduated 1880 from the University of Zurich) and Anna Bayerová (graduated 1881 from the University of Bern), had done so at Swiss universities rather than Czech ones, and had had to practice abroad as their doctorates were not recognized by their homeland. Honzáková was at first allowed only to go to lectures, not examinations, at medical school, but this changed after five years, when she was allowed to take exams for all she had been studying.

After graduation she worked for Charles Maydl, the founder of Czech surgery and anaesthesiology, as an unpaid trainee, but had to leave when he died, and could not get a medical post in the civil hospital. Therefore, Honzáková worked in an open private gynecological surgery in the street of Moráni in Prague for thirty-five years, until her death. She was also the school doctor for Minerva Grammar School. She wrote a biography of Anna Bayerová, as well as a publication on how to protect children from tuberculosis with Klementina Hanušová. She also created a fund to support sick and poor women.

A commemorative plaque was unveiled at the house in Na Moráni street where she practiced; however, it wrongly lists the date of her graduation as 18 March rather than 17 March.
