= Bedřich Křídlo =

Czech pianist, teacher and composer

- Born: 10 (Note: Stated so in his birth record, in his Czech National Museum record, in the Czech Music Dictionary of Persons and Institutions and on his gravestone. Alternatively, Havelka (1936) and Hofmanová (2000) write he was born on 11 September, and that also appeared in his obituary in Jičínské noviny (1902)) September 1876; Kopidlno, Bohemia, Austria-Hungary
- Died: 11 August 1902 (aged 25); Jičín, Bohemia, Austria-Hungary
- Occupations: composer; pianist; teacher
- Era: Romantic

Bedřich "Béda" Křídlo (10 September 1876 – 11 August 1902) was a Czech composer, virtuoso pianist and teacher. In the 1890s he established a reputation as a virtuoso pianist in Prague and elsewhere in Bohemia, performing both major piano repertoire and his own works. In 1900 he represented Austria-Hungary at the Anton Rubinstein Competition in Vienna and later became a piano teacher at the Imperial Conservatory in Chișinău, where he also promoted Czech music. His career was cut short by his chronic tuberculosis, with which he was infected throughout most of his life, and he died in Jičín at the age of 26.

== Biography ==
=== Early years ===
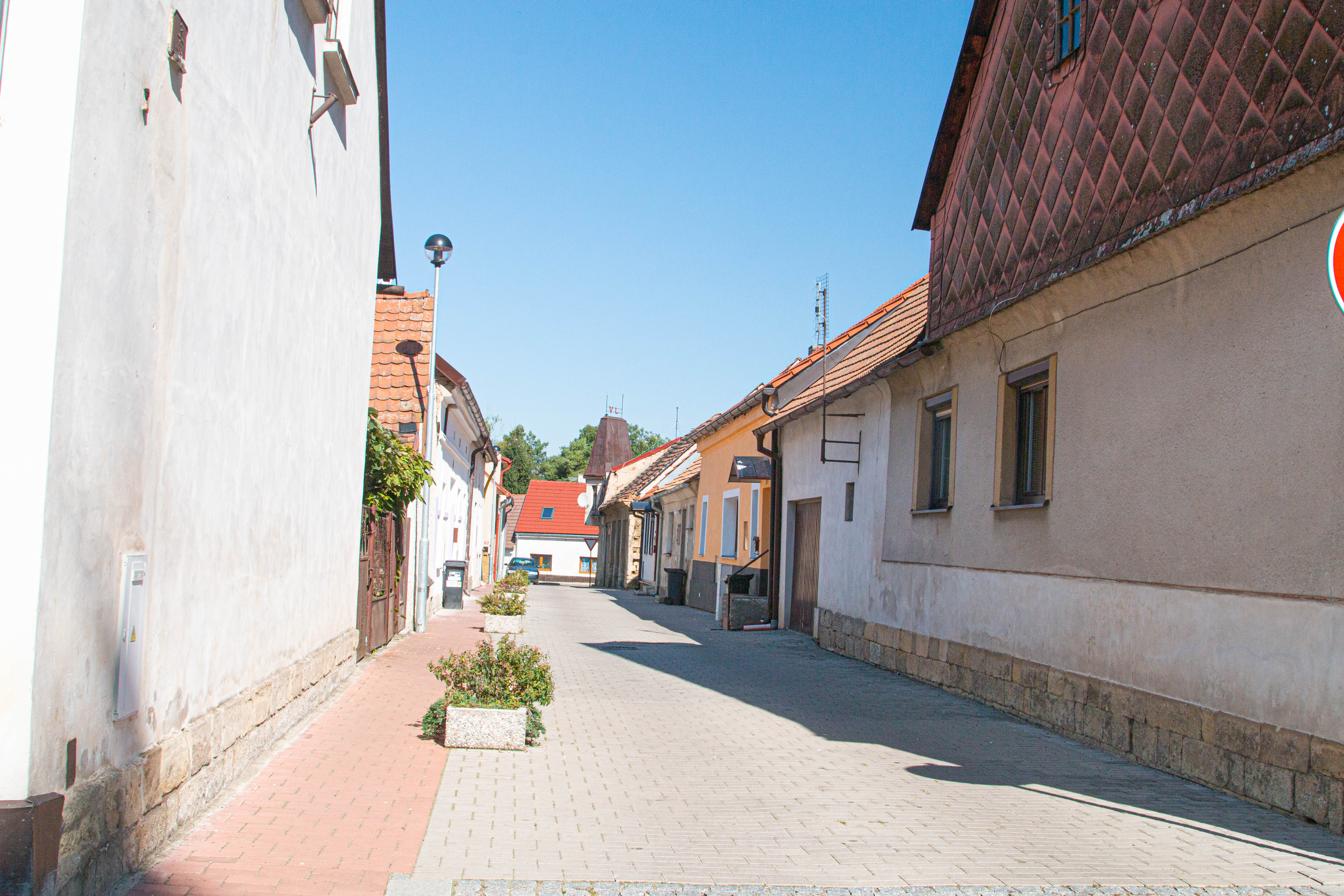
Bédy Křídla Street in Kopidlno, Křídlo's birth town, named after him

Bedřich Křídlo was born on 10 September 1876 in Kopidlno to Josef Křídlo and Františka (née Blechová), his second wife. His father, Josef, was at the time the local headmaster in Kopidlno's elementary school. Bedřich had a familial history of tuberculosis on his mother's side, who died from the same disease when he was a baby. Bedřich himself was sickly ever since he was born, and potentially contracted tuberculosis from his biological mother in his infancy. Josef later got married for the third time, to Marie (née Novotná).

Bedřich's musical education started during his time in the local elementary school, where he was taught by his father. His father, Josef, was also an organist and a minor composer, and he also played the organ in local church masses. Bedřich and his sister Zdeňka both helped their father, occasionally replacing Josef in playing the organ. In light of his musical talent, he was sent to the boys' civic school in Nová Paka, where he was taught by the composer František Hartl.

Křídlo's family moved to Jičín in 1890. Křídlo was then taught by František Jirásek, director of the Jičín church choir. In 1891 he started a three-year program in the organ school of the Prague Conservatory, and got accepted directly into the second year. He attended the organ school from 15 September 1891, to 8 July 1893, graduating with distinction and being accepted directly into the third year of his studies in the piano department of the Prague Conservatory. A day prior, on 7 July 1893, his first larger work was performed publicly for the first time, when the second and third movements of his string quartet in G minor was performed in Prague in 1893. It was performed again during his life in Drahoraz (today a part of Kopidlno) in 1897.

=== Prague Conservatory: 1893–1900 ===
In the Prague Conservatory, Křídlo was taught piano by Josef Jiránek, to whom he dedicated his piano pieces Op. 9, and Augustin Vyskočil, as well as learning composition from Karel Knittl, Karel Stecker, and Antonín Dvořák. He was also personally supported by Josef Foerster. He studied there until graduating on 7 July 1898.

On 7 July 1894, he made another public debut as a composer, making a symphonic poem for his final examinations. Příchod Vesny (The Coming of Vesna) in A minor was only performed twice: on 7 July 1894 in Prague, and on 21 August 1910 in Drahoraz by the Zvonář Society. In the same year, Křídlo began a series of 39 performances as a pianist in concerts, musical evenings and academies. He usually performed works by major composers and Liszt Ferenc in particular, as well as his own. Of those, a 22 were performed in Prague, three in Jičín, two in Jablonec, and once in each of the following: Lomnice, Hradec Králové, Český Brod, Vienna, and Lázně Bělohrad. In particular, concerts at Žofín Palace, the National House in Vinohrady, the Hlahol Association in Prague and the Lumír Society in Vienna helped solidify his reputation. He also planned a concert tour through the Czech countryside. The tour did not come to pass as the rural and sickly Křídlo focused his efforts to secure a definitive position in life as quickly as possible, both through performance and composition. Křídlo won ground for his compositions at various concerts in Prague and throughout Bohemia and several contemporary newspapers critiqued his playing favorably. His 1895 Piano Trio in E minor Op. 4 saw lesser success. The work, submitted under the name Per aspera ad astra to a competition, did not win, and when it was performed later on 28 April 1898 and 28 March 1899, it received mild critiques in the press, who expressed puzzlement on the excessive use of unisons between the violin and cello parts. Radikální listy excused the unripe and uneven nature of the composition as an early work of a composer only starting his career.

On 7 July 1898 he graduated from the Prague Conservatory. At the annual concert he played Rubinstein's E-flat major concerto with orchestral accompaniment, which he repeated on 5 December 1898 at a conservatory concert in support of its pension fund. B. Kalenský, a music journalist and a friend of Křídlo, noted the difficulty of the concert in the 18 and 25 of January 1899 volumes of Samostatnost. He questioned the decision of Jiránek to entrust such a piece to Křídlo, and suggested that

"perhaps Professor Jiránek's choice of Rubinstein's concerto was motivated by the desire to present the young composer Křídlo, the best of the students he has trained over the years, as a virtuoso who can boldly, without fear, rise to the icy heights of piano technique. Rubinstein's concerto is among the most difficult works in existence,"

seeing no other explanation. (Note: Kalenský, B. "[Unknown title, published on 18 and 25 of January 1899]". Samostatnost (in Czech). "K volbě Rubinsteinova koncertu svedla pana prof. Jiránka snad touha ukázati mladistvého skladatele Křídla, nejlepšího ze svých žáků, jenž nám tu během let vychoval, jako virtuosa, který může směle, beze strachu vystoupiti na výsiny ledové techniky klavírního umění. Jeť koncert Rubinsteinův z nejtěžších skladeb vůbec. Jiného vysvětlení pro volbu toho díla jsme neměli." – via Havelka, J. (1936). "Bedřich Křídlo". Sborník Musejního spolku v Jičíně (in Czech). II (4). Musejní spolek v Jičíně: 114.) Havelka (1936) instead suggested post factum that it was in preparation for the 1900 Anton Rubinstein Competition for which Křídlo continued studying with Josef Jiránek further in preparation, remaining in Prague two more years.

Towards the end of his studying in the conservatory, Křídlo became closely associated in particular with Klub mladých (Club of the Young), where his works were often performed. The club, founded in 1895 as a replacement for the Literary and Oratorical Society Slavia, saw Vítězslav Novák and later Josef Suk as chairmen of the music department. The club aimed to help young and uprising artists achieve public relevance and encourage the versatility in compositions of young composers. Performances were held at low cost or completely free. Křídlo participated too, both appearing in eight musical evenings, and eagerly and carefully studying and critiquing the manuscript novelties that were presented there for public judgment. Křídlo was in very close terms with the club, and on 28 March 1899, the Club even organized a special farewell evening for Béda Křídlo when he was leaving Prague.

He devoted the first half of 1900 to preparing for the Anton Rubinstein Competition, which was held in Vienna that year. He represented Austria-Hungary together with two others among 13 total competitors, of which 3 withdrew. Although the Rubinstein Prize was not awarded to Křídlo, his concert nevertheless achieved extraordinarily honorable success and was favorably received even in Russian criticism. Krakonoš' board (1902) attributed the loss to the absence of a representative from the Prague Conservatory, while Havelka (1936) has seen it as only natural for a nameless candidate faced with such competition. In April 1901, Křídlo received written confirmation that although his performance in the competition for the Rubinstein Prize was not considered the best, this was surely due only to circumstance and the unfamiliarity of his name, while his performance itself was nonetheless considered 'outstanding' in Russian circles.

=== Chișinău: 1900–1902 ===
After the competition, and in light of his recent success with Russian critics, Křídlo was offered a teaching position at the recently established Music College in the Chișinău branch of the Imperial Russian Musical Society, where he would teach piano performance. Křídlo accepted, both to secure himself a stable income and in hope the warmer climate would help against his pulmonary chronic illness. Křídlo started teaching there in September 1900. Shortly, he became a favorite of his students and beloved by the local audience. Already in November 1900, he appeared with great success at a conservatory concert, where the audience demanded repeated encores.

Soon afterward, however, he was required to begin military service. Having completed his study at the Prague Conservatory, Křídlo was conscripted as a K. K. Ersatzreservist, although only for eight weeks of training, which he could not endure in full. Already in the first days symptoms of his lung disease appeared. He was placed in a military hospital, where Křídlo stayed in a cold room and thus worsened his illness still further. He was temporarily placed on supernumerary status, and spent a long while between medical examinations, which he frustratedly described in a personal letter to have affected him "so that for several days before and after [he] cannot recover", (Note: "Co býti musí podle zákona — to se ovšem musí splniti — ale ta trýzeň, kterou já při každé takové prohlídce prožívám — a bylo těch prohlídek k nespočtení — ta působí na mne tak, že se kolik dnů před i po nemohu sebrat. Jsem zkrátka z toho nemocen." ~Personal letter dating to 11 October 1901) and that he "simply become sick of it". Only in the autumn of 1901 had to travel from Chișinău to Odesa to the Austrian consulate for the final examination before release from military obligation.

Křídlo welcomed his return to Chișinău thereafter, which he noted to have had a positive effect on his health in another letter (13 November 1901). According to his contract he was obliged to teach twenty students, in addition to two scholarship holders whom he taught free of charge, without claim to an honorarium. He received an invitation from the Viennese piano manufacturer Ludwig Bösendorfer to teach piano at the Vienna Conservatory, despite the prominent anti-Czech sentiment at the time. Bösendorfer even asked Křídlo to name his demands in both time and salary. Křídlo declined the offer, however, because he was satisfied in Chișinău and, more importantly, because the local climate suited him well.

In the summer of 1901, he stayed in Jičín, visiting his parents and performing at Lázně Bělohrad for an academy of the Central School Foundation. In October 1901 he returned to Chișinău to prepare for a major solo concert. At the end of 1901, the Czech Academy of Sciences and Arts awarded him a third prize for his piano compositions Op. 9, worth 500 crowns. On 29 December 1901, he gave his last larger solo concert with pieces of major difficulty. He wrote to his parents that the concert turned out far better than he expected, despite doubts shortly before the performance. The audience responded enthusiastically, calling him back many times and requesting encores, and waiting outside to greet and thank him after it was finally finished. Because of the applause, he had to perform several additional encores beyond the already demanding program. He still gave concerts on 14 March and 1 April 1902 in Chișinău, but at that time the advancement of the illness was beginning to manifest itself.

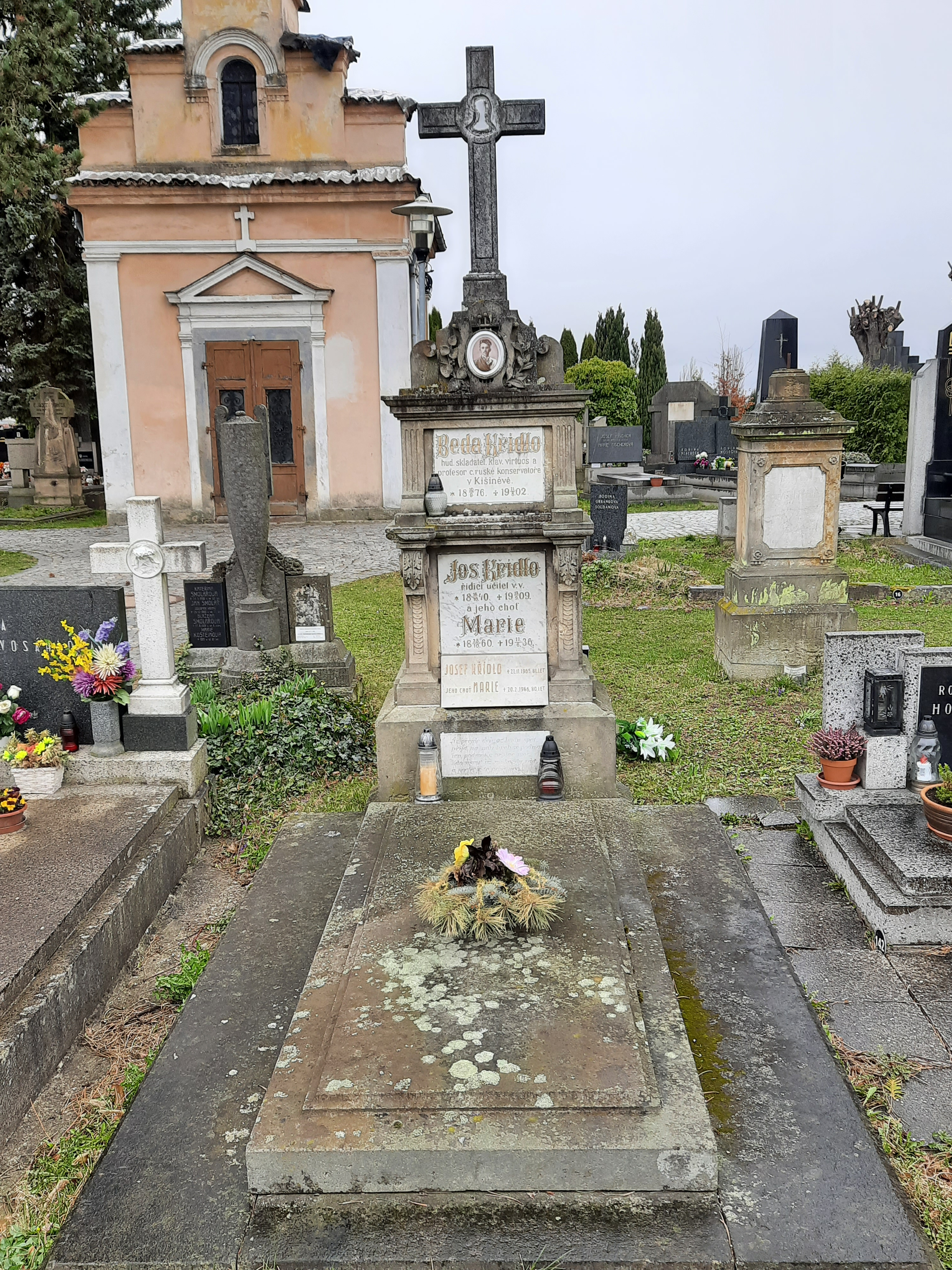
Křídlo's grave in the Jičín cemetery

Křídlo returned to Jičín on 11 May 1902 to spend the spring holiday break with his family. During his stay, his already advancing disease flared up and he had to prolong his stay in Jičín, becoming weaker by the day. He continued engaging in music during his rest, having composed the piano pieces in the collection Pro velké a malé děti and sending them to the publisher on 6 August. On 8 August, in a personal letter to his former teacher in the Prague Conservatory, Josef Jiránek, Křídlo explained the disease had spread to his intestines, and that over his last three months, he has been greatly weakened both physically and mentally.

Křídlo expressed hope he may be able to return to Chișinău in a year, and asked Jiránek to nominate two or three pianists for him to recommend as his substitutes in Chișinău. He died on 11 August 1902, in an inn in Jičín at 5 in the morning, 26 years old on his deathbed. He was buried in the afternoon of 13 August, in the Jičín cemetery. A part of his piano keyboard was embedded into his gravestone. The collection was published after his death, by the same publisher Křídlo sent it to five days before his death.

During his time in Bassarabia, Křídlo introduced Czech classical music, and especially Smetana there, where they were unknown previously. He was the first among several Czechs to teach in the Imperial Conservatory in Chișinău, followed by figures like the pianist Karel Vejrych and the violinist Stanislav Ondříček.

== Works ==
Digitization of the Polka from Czech Dances for piano in four hands Op. 7

Křídlo's style was majorly influenced by Tchaikovsky, whom Křídlo adored. Havelka (1936) noted that his Příchod Vesny Op. 6 was closest in structure to Tchaikovsky's works, and similarly did a contemporary critique at Radikální listy note similarity to Tchaikovsky in his Trio in E minor for piano, violin, and cello in three movements Op. 4. Havelka identifies Bedřich Smetana as another major influence.

In his short life, Křídlo composed several pieces, 12 were published with an opus number, the last of which was prepared for publication by Křídlo briefly preceding his death and was printed posthumously in 1903:

| Opus number | Title | Notes | Parts | Completion details | Published |
|---|---|---|---|---|---|
| 1 | Dvanáctá už udeřila | Choir for male voices with piano accompaniment to words by J. V. Sládek | - | Written in Jičín during the Christmas holidays of 1892 | - |
| 2 | String Quartet in G minor in four movements | - | I. Allegro con moto maestoso II. Andante III. Intermezzo (Allegro) IV. Finale (Allegro giusto) | 1893 | - |
| 3 | Four songs for one voice with piano accompaniment | "Composed and, in gratitude and love, dedicated to his dear teacher, the noble gentleman Mr. František Hartl, by his former pupil Bedřich Křídlo, graduate of the Organ School in Prague" Composed to songs by poets specified to the right in parentheses | Umklost stromů šumění (Hálek), July 1893; Já snil a dlouhý čas oněměl (Hálek), October 1892; Dudák (Sládek), January 1893; Ten boží svět tak daleký (Hálek), July 1893 | 1893 | - |
| 4 | Trio in E minor for piano, violin, and cello in three movements | Submitted to a competition under the title Per Aspera ad Astra | I. Allegro moderato ed appassionato II. Allegretto grazioso III. Allegro maestoso | 27 August 1895 | - |
| 5 | Double string quartet in four movements | - | I. Andante con moto, written from 22 July to 5 August 1893 II. Andante, written from 6 August to 11 August 1893 III. Intermezzo alla Scherzo, written from 4 August to 22 August 1893 IV. Finale, written from 23 August to 25 November 1893 | 1893, specific details to the left | - |
| 6 | Příchod Vesny | Symphonic picture in A minor for large orchestra | - | 1 June 1894 | - |
| 7 | Czech Dances for piano | Dedicated to his parents; printed in two arrangements: for piano two hands and for piano four hands | Polka; Furiant | In Jičín, on 26 August 1899 per the composer's copies | by František Augustin Urbánek No. 1160 |
| 8 | Quartets for male voices | Published in volume 37 of Dalibor Composed to songs by poets specified to the right in parentheses | Mých písní perut (Heinrich Heine).; Modlitba na Řípu (Jaroslav Vrchlický) | One copy of Mých písní perut estimated to be from 1899, another of Modlitba na Řípu estimated to 1900 | by František Augustin Urbánek |
| 9 | Piano pieces | Dedicated to his teacher Prof. Josef Jiránek | Preludietto; Impromptu; Papillon; Valse passionée | In Prague–Jičín on 31 March 1900, on the day before enlistment into the army per the composer's copies | by František Augustin Urbánek No. 1190 |
| 10 | Mrtvá láska | Choir for male voices Published in volume 52 of Dalibor | - | - | by František Augustin Urbánek |
| 11 | Songs for one voice with piano accompaniment | Composed to songs by poets specified to the right in parentheses | Divná duma, divná (Čech), for soprano; Proč se cesty klikatí (Eva z Hluboké), for soprano; Chudá dívčina (Sládek), for soprano; V sladké touze (Vrchlický), for baritone; Matičce (Neruda), for baritone | The last song dates to 12 May 1898 | - |
| 12 | Pro velké a malé děti | - | Modlitba; Po česku; Polka; Valčík; Strejček Škrhola; Mazurka; Na pochodu; Zastaveníčko; Na klíně matčině | 6 August 1902 | by Mojmír Urbánek in Prague, printed posthumously in 1903 |

Twelve others were listed by Havelka in 1936, although they were not published under an opus number:

- Ave Maria in G major. Composed in Nová Paka.
- Buď vůle Tvá. Trio for women's voices. Composed in Nová Paka.
- Arrangement for Weiss's March of the Grenadiers for piano four hands, violin, and cello. Completed on 21 September 1893.
- March, written in September 1895.
- Lísteček do památníku. Allegretto amabile in C sharp minor. Published in the musical supplement of "Zlatá Praha", Year IV, No. 7. Completed 28 October 1897 per the manuscript.
- Vzpomínky. Six waltzes for piano in one or two hands in an easy style, originally titled Valčíky. Dedicated to Miss Milada Macádková, which was later crossed out in the manuscript. A copy held in the Municipal Library of Prague was published as Op. 10.
- Přilítlo jaro z daleka. Song for tenor with piano accompaniment to words by Hálek. Havelka suggested that it intended to be included in some collection since the manuscript has the number 3 penciled on it.
- Fantasy for Two Pianos on motifs from The Bartered Bride by Bedř. Smetana. Manuscript thought to be lost by Havelka,, but an autographed copy owned by Václav Kolář is now found in the National Library of the Czech Republic.
- Salon Waltz. Piece for piano, a copy in the Czech Museum of Music is estimated to have been made in 1895.
- Russian Waltz for military orchestra.
- Arrangement for O. Fuchs' Romance for piano, violin, and cello.
- Wedding Chorus.
