= Kopidlno =

- Town
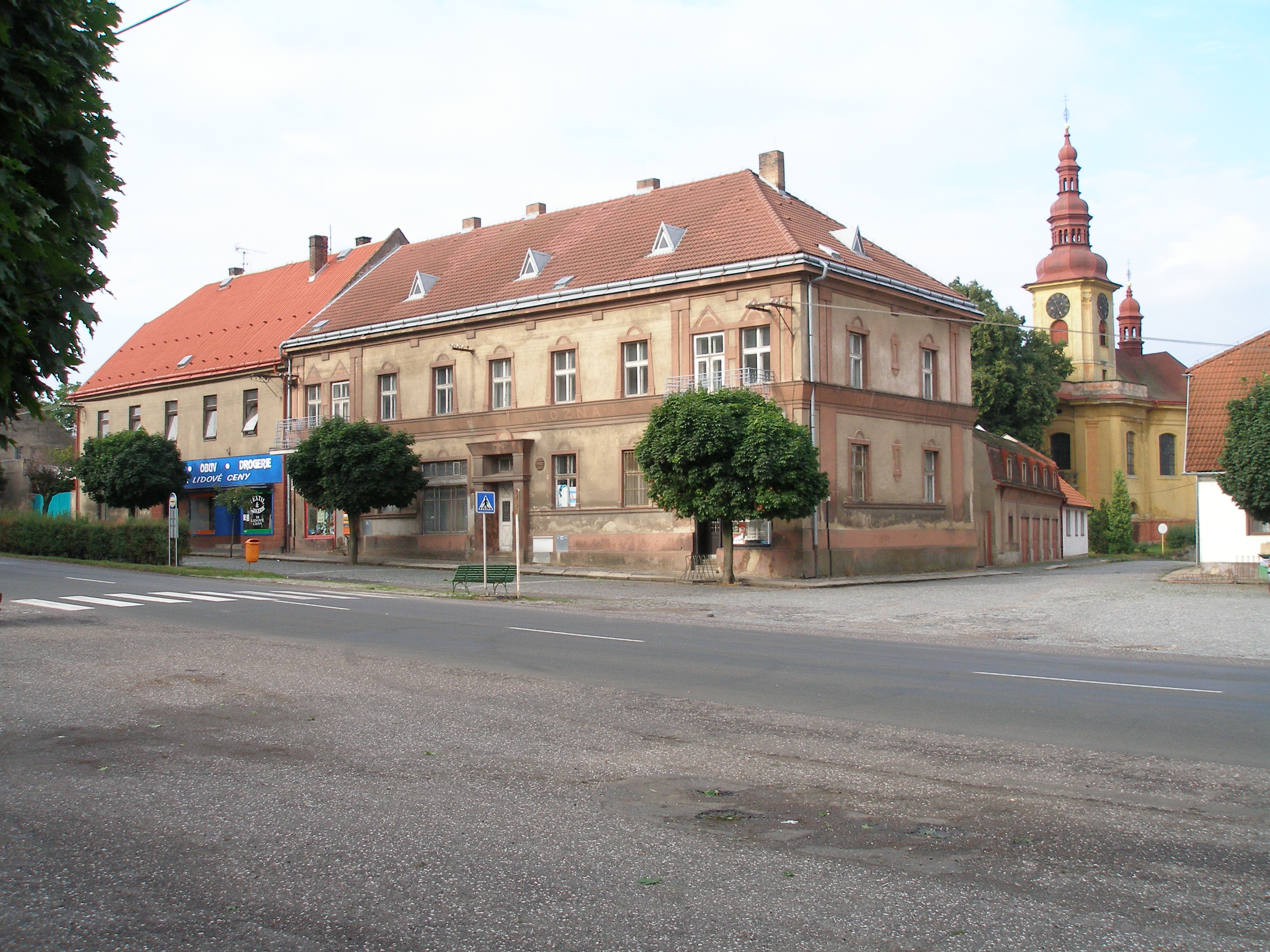
- View from the square towards the Church of Saint James the Great

- Coat of arms

- Location in the Czech Republic
- Coordinates: 50°20′3″N 15°15′57″E
- Country: Czech Republic
- Region: Hradec Králové
- District: Jičín
- First mentioned: 1322

Government
  - Mayor: Karel Žižka

Area
  - Total: 29.14 km^{2} (11.25 sq mi)
- Elevation: 219 m (719 ft)

Population (2026-01-01)
  - Total: 2,135
  - Density: 73.27/km^{2} (189.8/sq mi)
- Time zone: UTC+1 (CET)
  - Summer (DST): UTC+2 (CEST)
- Postal code: 507 32
- Website: www.kopidlno.cz

Kopidlno (Czech pronunciation: [ˈkopɪdl̩no]) is a town in Jičín District in the Hradec Králové Region of the Czech Republic. It has about 2,100 inhabitants. The town is located on the Mrlina River, on the border between the Central Elbe Table and Jičín Uplands.

Kopidlo was founded in the first quarter of the 14th century at the latest and became a town in 1514. Among the main landmark of the town are the Church of Saint James the Great and Kopidlno Castle.

== Administrative division ==
Kopidlno consists of five municipal parts (in brackets population according to the 2021 census):

- Kopidlno (1,723)
- Drahoraz (80)
- Mlýnec (79)
- Ledkov (16)
- Pševes (141)

== Etymology ==
The name Kopidlno is probably derived from the name of medicinal plants found in the surrounding forests (Asarum europaeum, colloquially known in Czech as kopidlen). According to other theories, it might be derived from the Old Czech kopjo dlinno (i.e. 'long spear') or from kopidlo ('hay stake').

== Geography ==
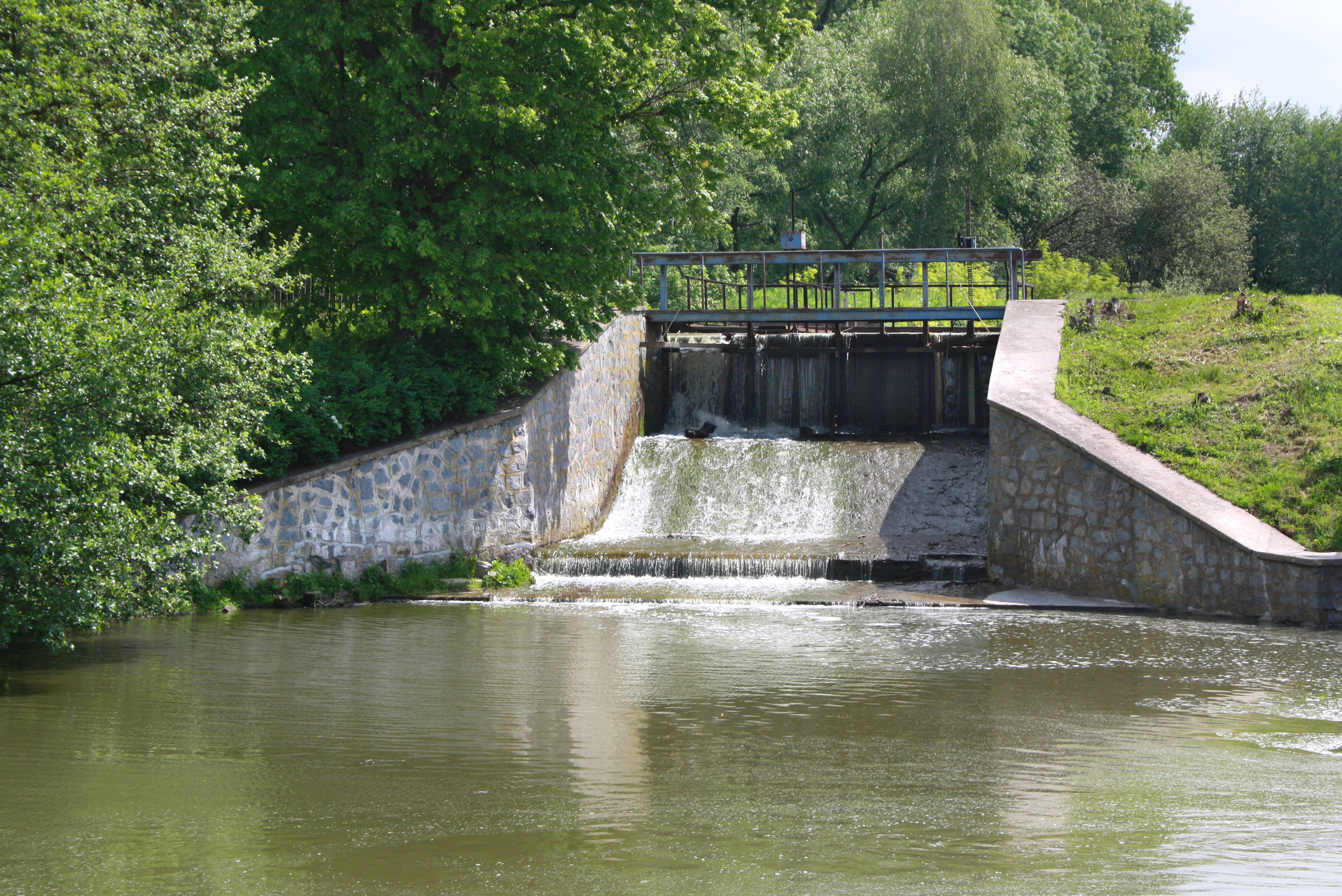
Mrlina River in Kopidlno

Kopidlno is located about 13 kilometres (8 mi) south of Jičín and 59 km (37 mi) northeast of Prague. It lies mostly in the Central Elbe Table, but the municipal territory also extends to the Jičín Uplands in the north and east. The town is situated on the Mrlina River. There are several fishponds in the territory, the largest of which are Zrcadlo and Zámecký rybník.

== History ==
The first written mention of Kopidlno is from 1322. The first owners of Kopidlno were the Kopidlanský family. Among the next owners were many notable noble families, including Haugwitz, Trčka of Lípa, Thurn und Taxis and Schlick, and individuals Albrecht von Wallenstein and Ludwig of Dietrichstein. In 1514, Kopidlno was promoted to a town by King Vladislaus II. The most important owners of Kopidlno were the Schlick family. During their era, crafts and education developed in the town.

== Demographics ==
Historical population

Year	Pop.	±%
1869	2,462	—
1880	3,022	+22.7%
1890	3,169	+4.9%
1900	3,087	−2.6%
1910	3,061	−0.8%

Year	Pop.	±%
1921	3,183	+4.0%
1930	3,083	−3.1%
1950	2,487	−19.3%
1961	2,509	+0.9%
1970	2,299	−8.4%

Year	Pop.	±%
1980	2,092	−9.0%
1991	1,972	−5.7%
2001	2,204	+11.8%
2011	2,076	−5.8%
2021	2,039	−1.8%

Source: Censuses

== Transport ==
The I/32 road, which connect the D11 motorway with Jičín, runs through the town.

Kopidlno is located on the railway line Jičín–Nymburk.

There is an experimental railway line between Kopidlno and Dolní Bousov, on which an autonomous train was put into operation in 2025, the first on a free track in Europe.

== Culture ==
The Czech bluegrass festival called Banjo Jamboree, founded in 1972 in Kopidlno, is the first and longest-running Bluegrass festival in Europe. In 1992, it was moved to Čáslav.

== Sights ==
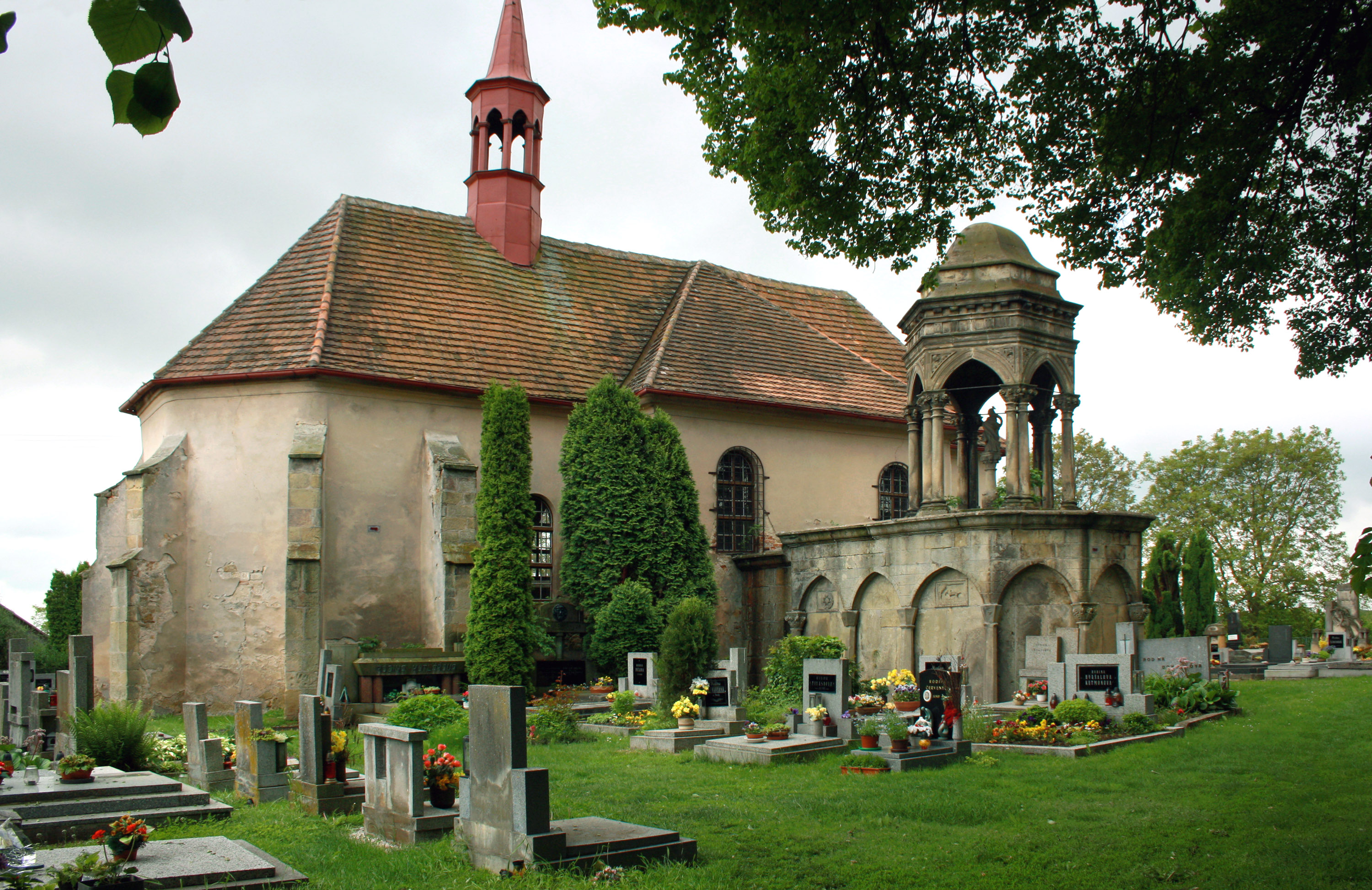
Church of Saints Peter and Paul in Drahoraz

There are two notable historical buildings, a castle and a church. The Kopidlno Castle dates from the mid-16th century, when it replaced an old fortress. The current Neo-Renaissance appearance is a result of the reconstruction in the mid-19th century. Today it houses a horticulture school and is inaccessible.

The Church of Saint James the Great was built in the Baroque style in 1704–1705. It replaced a Gothic church, destroyed by fire in 1677.

In the village of Drahoraz there is the Church of Saints Peter and Paul. It is a Gothic building from the 15th century. In 1695–1698, the Chapel of the Holy Sepulchre was added to the church. The wooden bell tower next to the church dates from 1893.

== Notable people ==
- Joseph Anton Steffan (1726–1797), Austrian composer
- Anna Honzáková (1875–1940), medical doctor
- Bedřich Křídlo (1876–1902), composer and pianist
