= 5th Battalion of the 14th Central Bosnian Brigade =

Yugoslav partisan unit

5 Battalion 14 Środkowobośniackiej Brygady NOVJ was an anti-Nazi resistance unit active in the area of Bosnia during World War II as a part of the Yugoslavian National Liberation Army and consisted mainly of Bosnian Poles.

The group was formed on 7 May 1944 by Poles of Bosnia and Herzegovina. In September 1944 it was renamed to the 3rd Battalion. The formation was terminated in August 1945.

The battalion flag was white and red (Polish Flag) with a red star (Flag of Yugoslavia).

== Bibliography ==
- Wojsko Polskie 1939-1945 Stanisław Komornicki, Zygmunt Bielecki, Wanda Bigoszewska, Adam Jonca; Warsaw 1984
