= Josef Ladislav Píč =

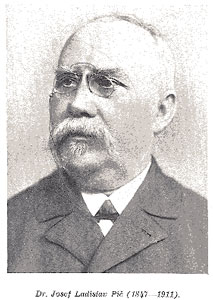
- Born: 19 January 1847; Mšeno, Austrian Empire
- Died: 19 December 1911 (aged 64); Prague, Czechoslovakia
- Education: Charles University
- Occupation: archaeologist

Josef Ladislav Píč (19 January 1847 – 19 December 1911) was a Czech archaeologist and paleontologist. He is considered one of founders of modern Czech archaeology.

== Life and career ==
Píč was born on 19 January 1847 in Mšeno, Bohemia, Austrian Empire. He studied history and Slavic languages at the Charles University in Prague (then called Karl-Ferdinand University). He taught at a grammar school and a university, and planned to write the cultural history of Bohemia, which led to his interest in archaeology. In 1883, he became docent of history at the university.

In 1887, he started working at the National Museum (then named České museum) in Prague. In 1893, he was named as the first head of the new Department of Prehistory. He and his colleagues created and maintained collection prehistoric artefacts. His major literary work was Starožitnosti země české (1899–1909), in three parts, about ancient history of Czech lands.

Exhaustion, conflicts with colleagues about his work and involvement in fights over validity of the Rukopis královédvorský a zelenohorský manuscripts drove him to suicide. He died on 19 December 1911 in Prague.

== Publications ==
His publications include;

- Ueber die abstammung der Rumänen (Duncker & Humblot, 1880)
- Der nationale Kampf gegen das ungarische Staatsrecht: ein Beitrag zur Kritik der älteren ungarischen Geschichte (Duncker & Humblot, 1882)
- Zur rumänisch-ungarischen streitfrage (Duncker & Humblot, 1886)
- Dějiny národa ruského (Matice české, 1889)
- Archaeologicky vyzkum ve středních Čechách: který r. 1889-92 společnou prací podnikli Jan Hellich, J. L. Píč, Vaclav Požárecký, a Jan Wanek s předml. Bójové, Markomani a Česi (Píč, 1893)
- Starožitnosti země české, sv. 1. Na základě praehistorické stírky Musea král. českého, píse J. L. Píč. (Nákl. vlastním, 1899)
- Přehled české archaeologie (Nakl. archaeologické komisse při České akademii Císaře Františka Josefa pro vědy, slovesnost a umění, 1908)
