= Mšeno =

- Town
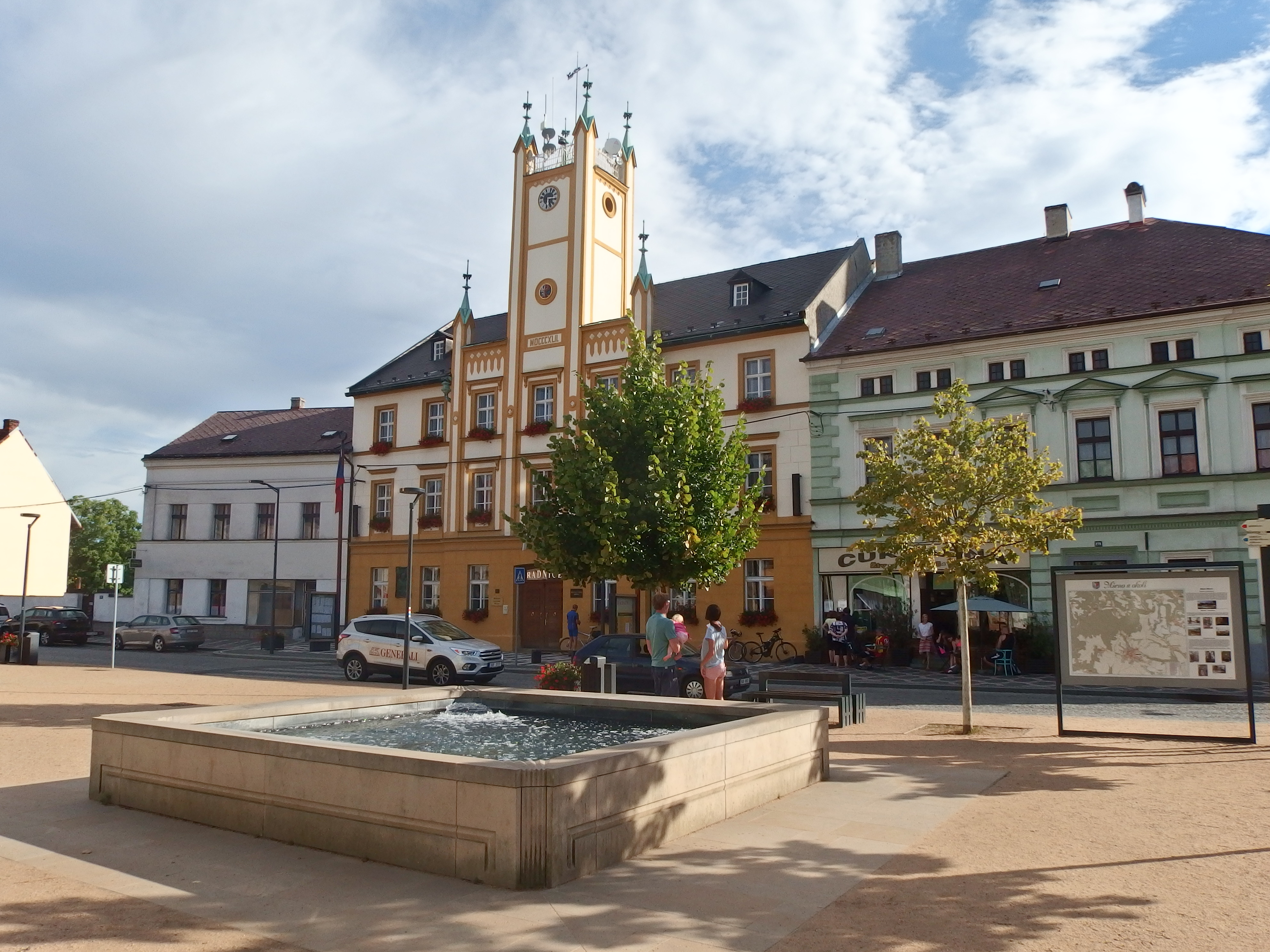
- Náměstí Míru, the centre of the town

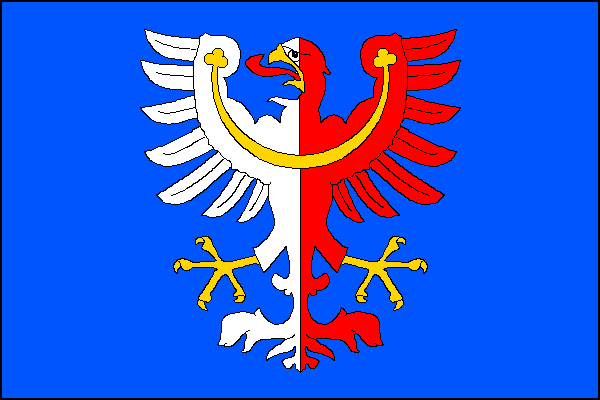
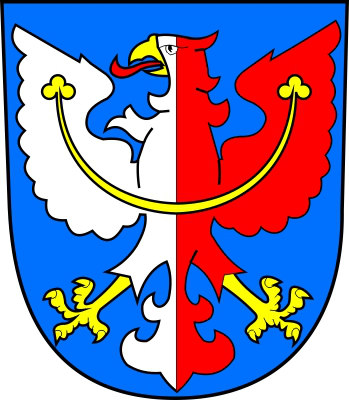
- Flag Coat of arms

- Location in the Czech Republic
- Coordinates: 50°26′16″N 14°37′52″E
- Country: Czech Republic
- Region: Central Bohemian
- District: Mělník
- First mentioned: 1306

Government
  - Mayor: Jiří Guttenberg

Area
  - Total: 26.73 km^{2} (10.32 sq mi)
- Elevation: 358 m (1,175 ft)

Population (2026-01-01)
  - Total: 1,406
  - Density: 52.60/km^{2} (136.2/sq mi)
- Time zone: UTC+1 (CET)
  - Summer (DST): UTC+2 (CEST)
- Postal code: 277 35
- Website: www.mestomseno.cz

Mšeno (Czech pronunciation: [ˈm̩ʃɛno]; German: Wemschen) is a town in Mělník District the Central Bohemian Region of the Czech Republic. It has about 1,400 inhabitants. The town is a gateway to the Kokořínsko – Máchův kraj Protected Landscape Area.

Mšeno was promoted to a town in 1367. The historic town centre, known for many well-preserved timbered and half-timbered houses, is protected as an urban monument zone.

== Administrative division ==
Mšeno consists of nine municipal parts (in brackets population according to the 2021 census):

- Mšeno (1,221)
- Brusné 2.díl (7)
- Hradsko (18)
- Olešno (20)
- Ráj (11)
- Romanov (8)
- Sedlec (119)
- Skramouš (39)
- Vojtěchov (8)

== Etymology ==
The name is derived from the Czech word mech (i.e. 'moss') and the adjective mešný ('covered with moss').

== Geography ==
Mšeno is located about 14 kilometres (9 mi) northeast of Mělník and 37 km (23 mi) north of Prague. It lies on the border between the Jizera Table and Ralsko Uplands. The highest point is the hill Uhelný vrch at 451 m (1,480 ft) above sea level. There are two small fishponds inside the built-up area: Jezero and Černík. They are built on the spring of the stream Košátecký potok.

A large part of the municipal territory lies in the Kokořínsko – Máchův kraj Protected Landscape Area and Mšeno is considered a gateway to this touristically attractive area.

== History ==
The Slavic people settled the town area probably in the 5th–6th centuries. The first written mention of Mšeno is from 1306, in a document signed by Wenceslaus III awarding the then-village to aristocrat Hynek of Dubá. He, and his son after him, ensured the growing prosperity of the area. In 1367, King Charles IV promoted Mšeno to a town.

During the Thirty Years' War the town suffered, but in the 17th and 18th centuries, it prospered and the population grew. In 1879, the railway was built, and in 1901, the school was opened.

== Demographics ==
Historical population

| Year | Pop. | ±% |
|---|---|---|
| 1869 | 3,321 | — |
| 1880 | 3,173 | −4.5% |
| 1890 | 3,026 | −4.6% |
| 1900 | 2,925 | −3.3% |
| 1910 | 2,862 | −2.2% |

| Year | Pop. | ±% |
|---|---|---|
| 1921 | 2,788 | −2.6% |
| 1930 | 2,801 | +0.5% |
| 1950 | 2,049 | −26.8% |
| 1961 | 1,910 | −6.8% |
| 1970 | 1,763 | −7.7% |

| Year | Pop. | ±% |
|---|---|---|
| 1980 | 1,651 | −6.4% |
| 1991 | 1,434 | −13.1% |
| 2001 | 1,409 | −1.7% |
| 2011 | 1,544 | +9.6% |
| 2021 | 1,451 | −6.0% |

Source: Censuses

== Transport ==
Mšeno is located on the railway line Mělník–Mladějov.

== Sport ==
The Mšeno Speedway Stadium is a motorcycle speedway track located on the eastern edge of the town. The stadium is used for speedway and football. There is also a clay tennis court. The stadium is the home venue for the team PDK Mšeno.

== Sights ==
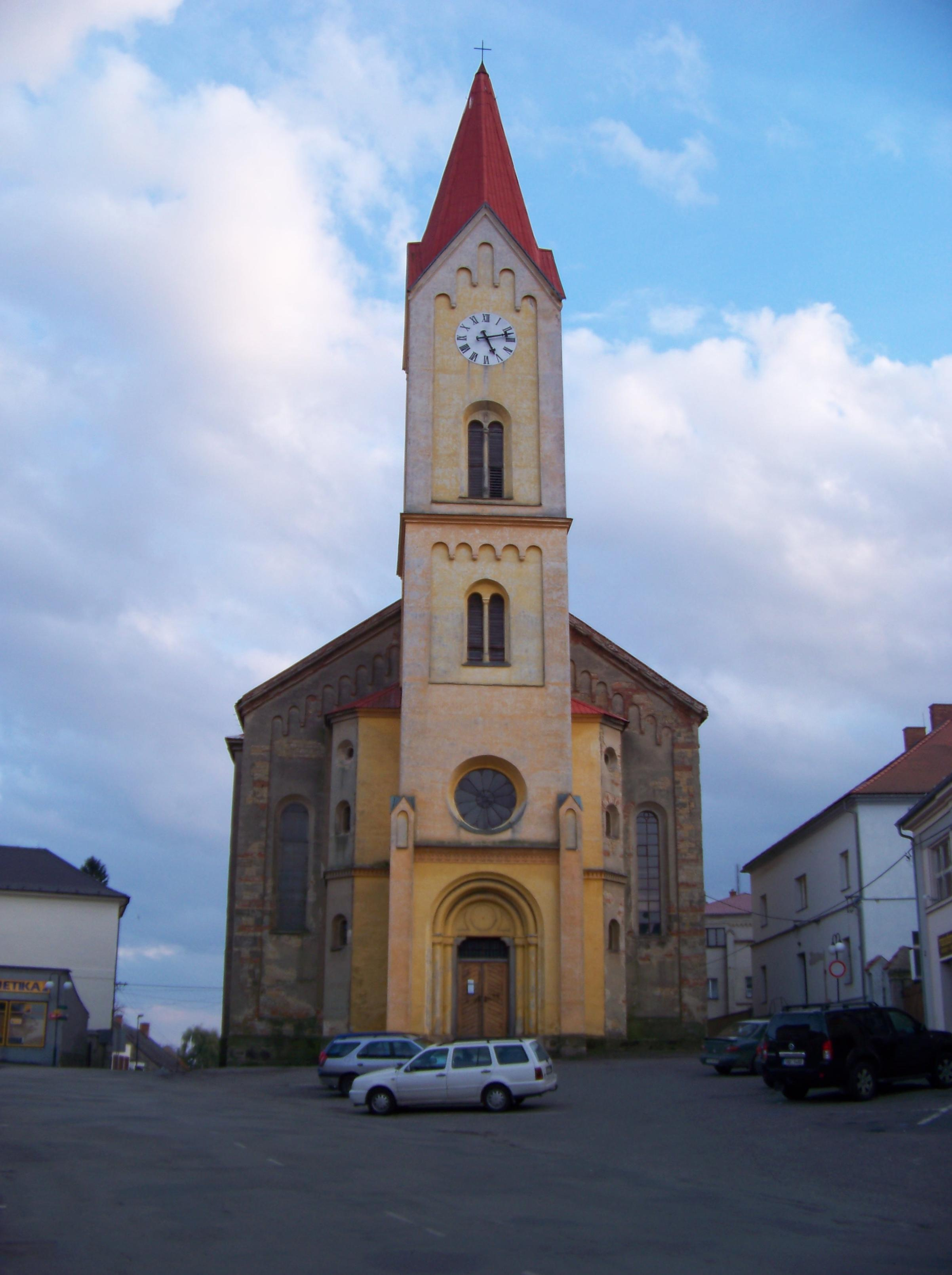
Church of Saint Martin

A valuable and numerous set of two-storey timbered and half-timbered small-town architecture is typical for the outskirts of the town. Most of the older buildings on the square disappeared during a large fire in 1867. The current appearance of the main urban spaces is determined by the late Neoclassical and eclectic buildings.

In 1842, the town hall was built, then it was rebuilt and raised in the neo-Gothic style in 1864.

The predecessor of today's parish church was allegedly the Church of Saint Wenceslaus, built in the Romanesque style. In 1876–1879, the Church of Saint Martin was built. It has a high tower and it is the main urban and landscape landmark.

== Notable people ==
- Wojciech Żywny (1756–1842), Czech-Polish pianist
- Johann Baptist Pischek (1814–1873), Czech-Austrian opera singer
- Josef Ladislav Píč (1847–1911), archaeologist and paleontologist
- Anna Bayerová (1853–1924), medical doctor
