= Johann Baptist Pischek =

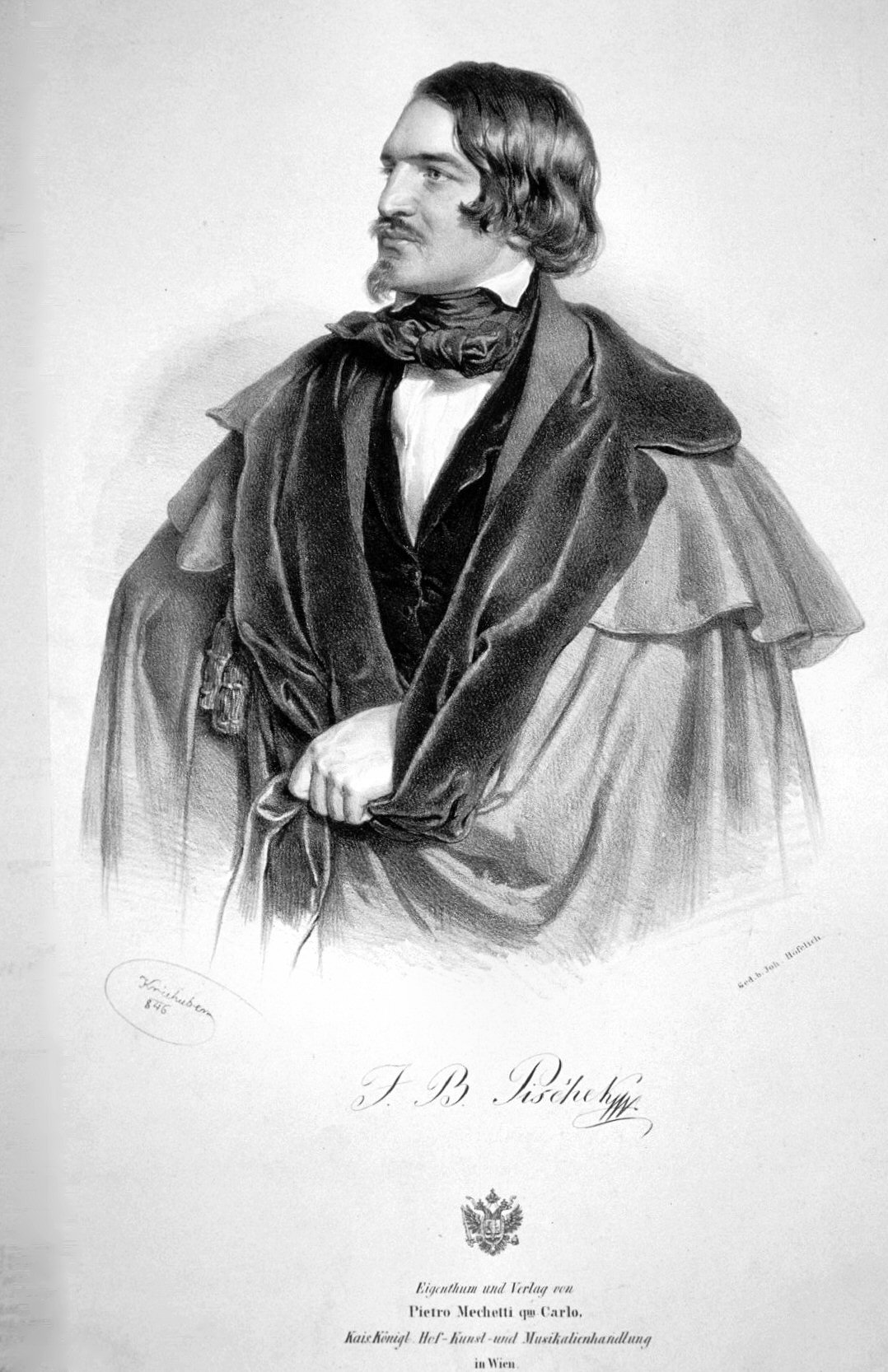
Lithograph by Josef Kriehuber

Johann Baptist Pischek (Czech: Jan Křtitel Píšek; 14 October 1814 – 16 February 1873) was a Czech-Austrian operatic baritone. He appeared in opera houses and concert halls in Austria, Germany and England.

== Life ==
Pischek was born in 1814 in Mšeno in Bohemia, at that time part of the Austrian Empire. His musical talent was noted at an early age. He studied law in Prague; however, after attending in 1834 a performance of The Barber of Seville there, he committed himself to a musical career. He was offered a contract in Prague by the theatre director Johann August Stöger, and appeared on stage in June 1835 as Oroveso in Bellini's Norma, but was not offered further roles in the following months.

Unable to continue his legal studies, he gave piano lessons. His career revived when, in 1838 in Brno, replacing an indisposed singer, he successfully played Riccardo in Bellini's I puritani, and appeared in subsequent operas there. He signed in June 1839 a contract with Franz Pokorny, director of the Theater in der Josefstadt in Vienna, where he was very successful.

In 1840, Pischek was engaged as lead baritone at the opera house of Frankfurt am Main. He was appointed in 1844 court-singer to the King of Württemberg at Stuttgart, and retained the appointment until his retirement in 1863. He was also made Kammersänger, and appeared at the Staatsoper Stuttgart. Pischek travelled a great deal, and performed at many venues in Germany, especially in Frankfurt am Main, where he sang, both on the stage in a variety of parts, and in concerts, year after year from 1840 to 1848.

Pischek died in Sigmaringen, while visiting his daughter, on 16 February 1873.

=== In England ===
In England he was a great favourite for several years. He made his first appearance on 1 May 1845, at a concert in which Rosalbina Caradori-Allan appeared; he sang at the Philharmonic Society on the following Monday and three more times during the season there. He reappeared in England in 1846, 1847 and 1849, and maintained his popularity in the concert room, and in oratorio, singing in 1849 the title part of Elijah at the Birmingham Festival with great effect. On the stage of the Theatre Royal, Drury Lane during the same year his Don Giovanni was not so successful. He was heard again in 1853 at the New Philharmonic Society's concerts.

== Commentary ==
His biographer in A Dictionary of Music and Musicians (1900) wrote: "In voice, enunciation, feeling, and style, Pischek was first-rate. His repertoire was large, embracing operas and pieces of Gluck, Mozart, Méhul, Beethoven, Spohr, Weber, Donizetti, Harold, Lachner, Kreutzer, Lindpaintner.... As an actor he was prone to exaggeration. But it was in his ballads, especially in Lindpaintner's "Standard-bearer", that he carried away his audience.... His voice was a fine rich bass, with a very pure falsetto of 3 or 4 notes, which he managed exquisitely...."
