= Vojkovice (Mělník District) =

- Municipality
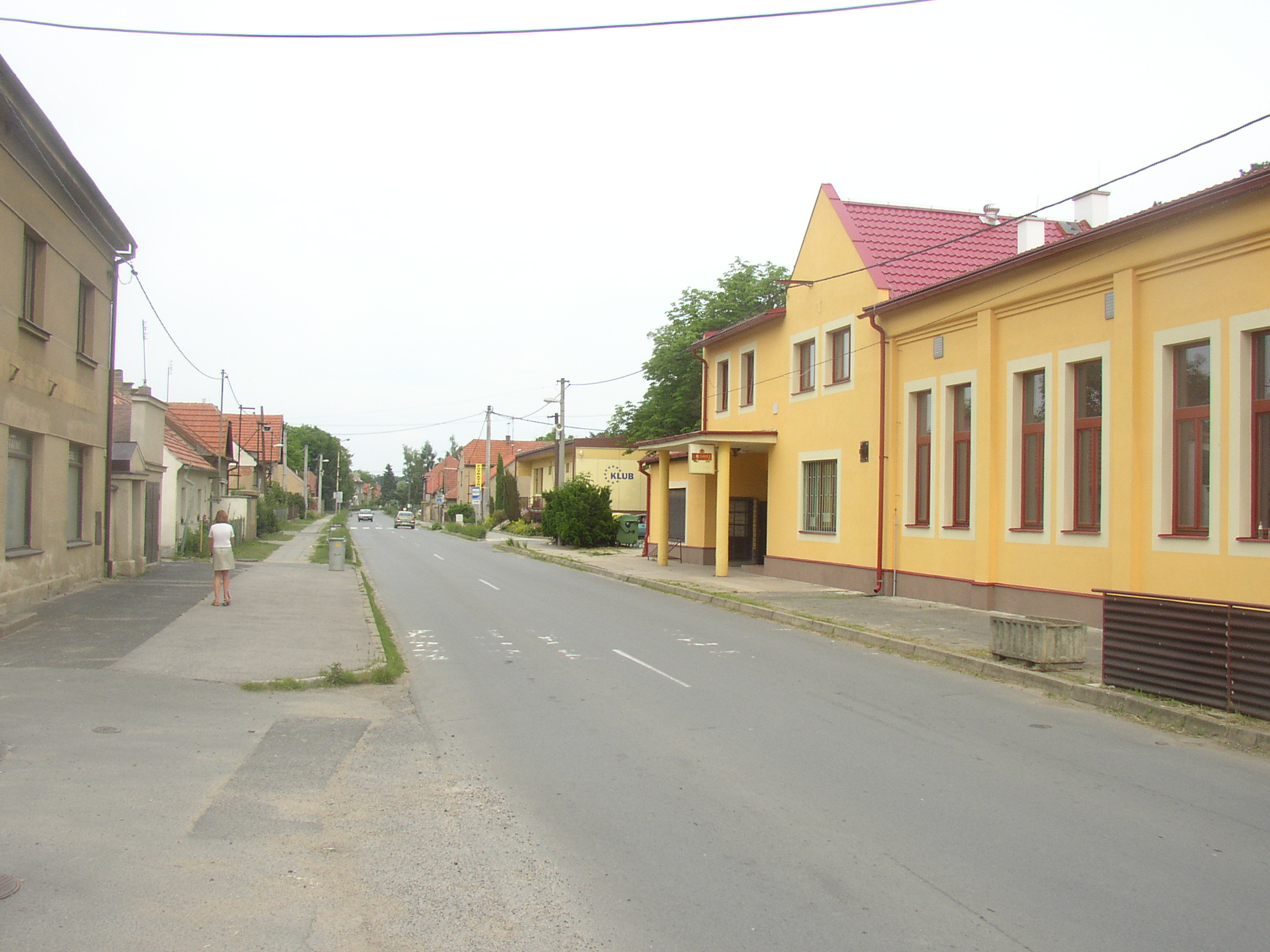
- Main road

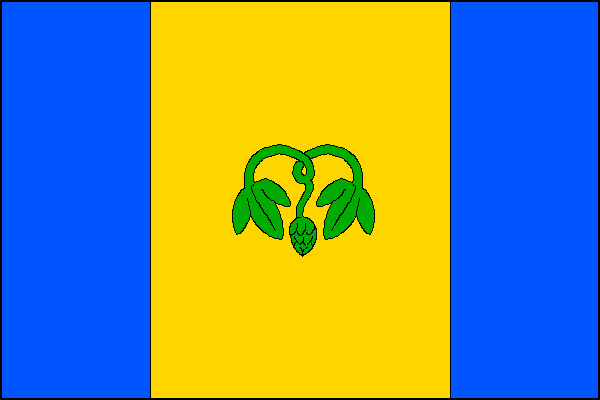
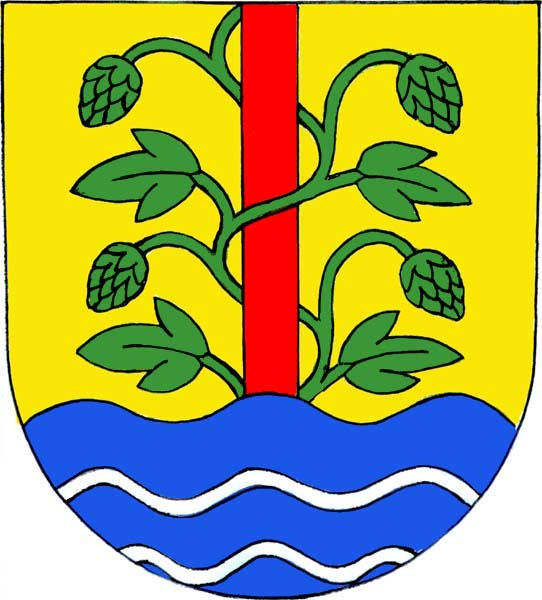
- Flag Coat of arms

- Location in the Czech Republic
- Coordinates: 50°17′46″N 14°22′31″E
- Country: Czech Republic
- Region: Central Bohemian
- District: Mělník
- First mentioned: 12th century

Area
  - Total: 11.11 km^{2} (4.29 sq mi)
- Elevation: 163 m (535 ft)

Population (2026-01-01)
  - Total: 1,055
  - Density: 94.96/km^{2} (245.9/sq mi)
- Time zone: UTC+1 (CET)
  - Summer (DST): UTC+2 (CEST)
- Postal code: 277 44
- Website: www.obecvojkovice.cz

Vojkovice is a municipality and village in Mělník District in the Central Bohemian Region of the Czech Republic. It has about 1,100 inhabitants.

== Administrative division ==
Vojkovice consists of four municipal parts (in brackets population according to the 2021 census):

- Vojkovice (640)
- Bukol (110)
- Dědibaby (72)
- Křivousy (49)

== Etymology ==
The name Vojkovice is derived from the personal name Vojek, meaning "the village of Vojek's people".

== Geography ==
Vojkovice is located about 10 kilometres (6 mi) southwest of Mělník and 19 km (12 mi) north of Prague. It lies in a flat agricultural landscape in the Central Elbe Table. The municipality is situated on the right bank of the Vltava River, which forms the northern municipal border.

== History ==
The first written mention of Vojkovice is in a hoax from the 12th century, according to which allegedly in 1088 King Vratislaus II donated the village to the newly established Vyšehrad Chapter. The chapter owned Vojkovice until the mid-14th century.

== Demographics ==
Historical population

Year	Pop.	±%
1869	877	—
1880	848	−3.3%
1890	816	−3.8%
1900	807	−1.1%
1910	889	+10.2%

Year	Pop.	±%
1921	1,047	+17.8%
1930	1,099	+5.0%
1950	994	−9.6%
1961	972	−2.2%
1970	924	−4.9%

Year	Pop.	±%
1980	811	−12.2%
1991	674	−16.9%
2001	660	−2.1%
2011	879	+33.2%
2021	871	−0.9%

Source: Censuses

== Transport ==
There are no railways or major roads passing through the municipality.

== Sights ==
The main landmark of the municipality is the Church of Saint Bartholomew, located in Bukol. It is a Romanesque church from the 13th century, modified in the Baroque style in the 18th century.

== Notable people ==
- Bohuslava Kecková (1854–1911), physician
