= Kostomlaty nad Labem =

- Municipality
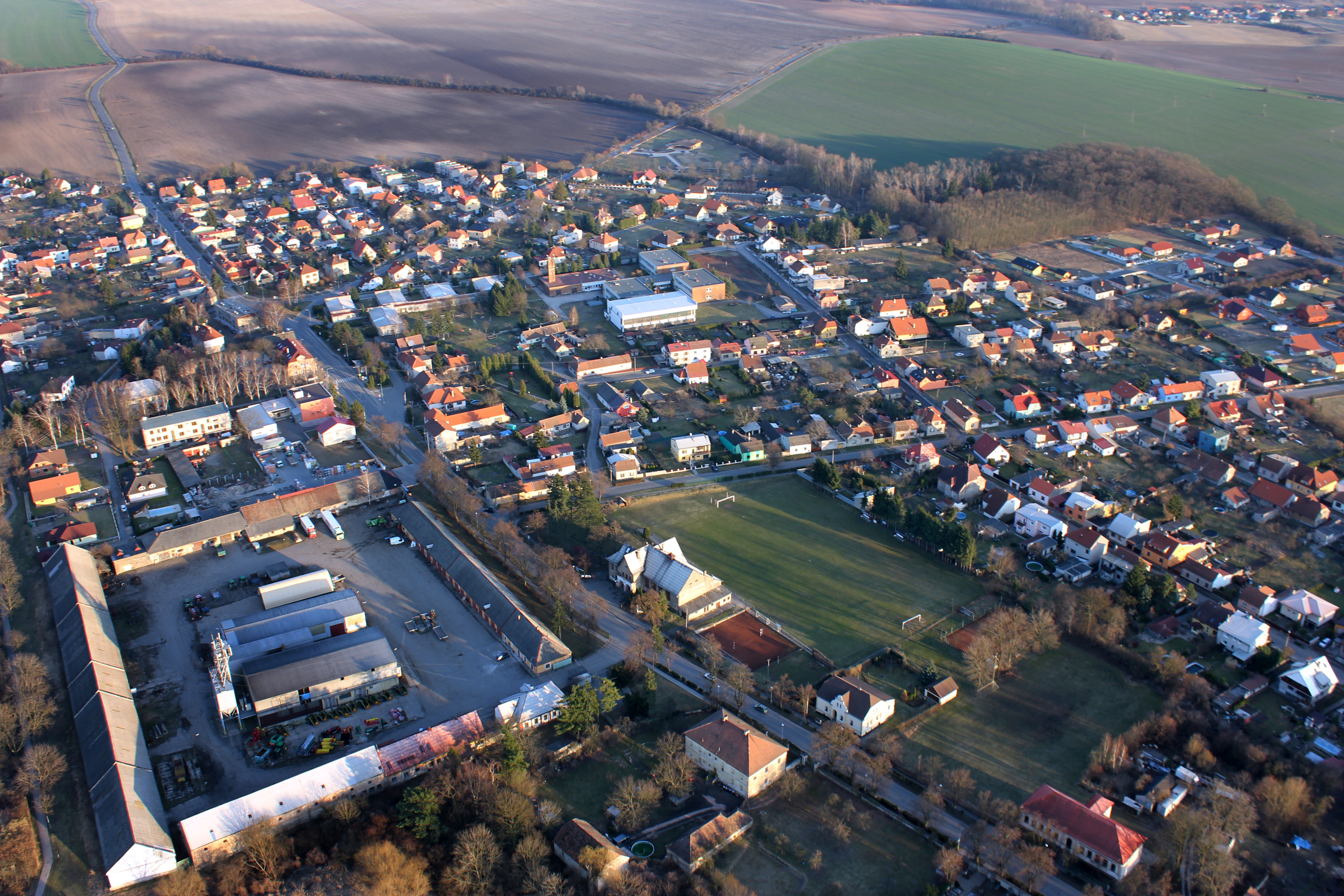
- Aerial view

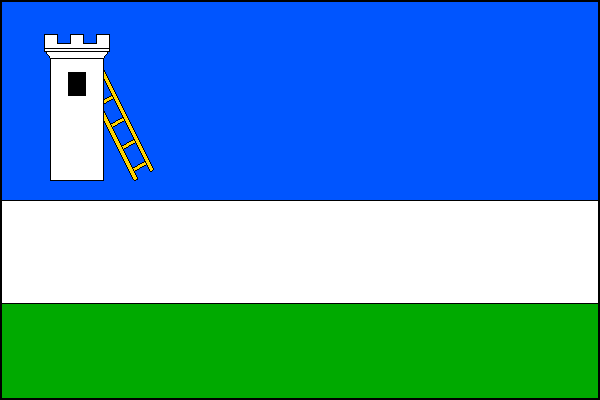
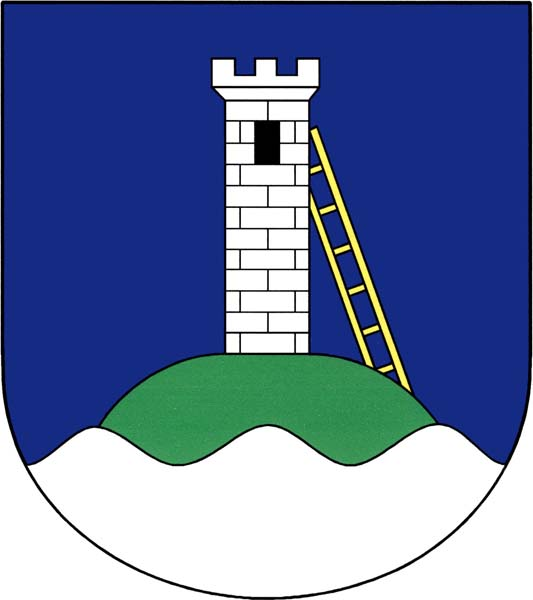
- Flag Coat of arms

- Location in the Czech Republic
- Coordinates: 50°10′55″N 14°57′23″E
- Country: Czech Republic
- Region: Central Bohemian
- District: Nymburk
- First mentioned: 1223

Area
  - Total: 18.05 km^{2} (6.97 sq mi)
- Elevation: 184 m (604 ft)

Population (2026-01-01)
  - Total: 1,939
  - Density: 107.4/km^{2} (278.2/sq mi)
- Time zone: UTC+1 (CET)
  - Summer (DST): UTC+2 (CEST)
- Postal codes: 289 21, 289 25
- Website: kostomlaty-obec.cz

Kostomlaty nad Labem (German: Groß Kostomlat) is a municipality and village in Nymburk District in the Central Bohemian Region of the Czech Republic. It has about 1,900 inhabitants.

== Administrative division ==
Kostomlaty nad Labem consists of five municipal parts (in brackets population according to the 2021 census):

- Kostomlaty nad Labem (1,403)
- Hronětice (169)
- Lány (114)
- Rozkoš (99)
- Vápensko (73)

== Etymology ==
The name Kostomlaty was derived from the Czech words kost ('bone') and mlátit ('thresh'). It was a village of people who threshed bones.

== Geography ==
Kostomlaty nad Labem is located about 5 kilometres (3 mi) west of Nymburk and 29 km (18 mi) northeast of Prague. It lies in a flat agricultural landscape in the Central Elbe Table lowland within the Polabí region. The municipality is situated on the right bank of the Elbe River, which forms the southern municipal border. The Vlkava River flows through the municipality into the Elbe.

== History ==
The first written mention of Kostomlaty is from 1223. Existence of a castle in Kostomlaty was documented in the mid-14th century, but in 1553 at the latest, the castle was already abandoned. In the 1420s, the village and the castle were acquired by Hynek Boček of Poděbrady, and in 1458, Kostomlaty passed into ownership of King George of Poděbrady. Later it was inherited by his descendants, then it often changed owners. Among the most important owners was the Sporck family, who held it from 1647 to 1722 as a part of the Lysá estate.

== Demographics ==
Historical population

Year	Pop.	±%
1869	1,593	—
1880	1,812	+13.7%
1890	1,913	+5.6%
1900	1,781	−6.9%
1910	1,718	−3.5%

Year	Pop.	±%
1921	1,906	+10.9%
1930	2,040	+7.0%
1950	1,912	−6.3%
1961	1,857	−2.9%
1970	1,764	−5.0%

Year	Pop.	±%
1980	1,702	−3.5%
1991	1,629	−4.3%
2001	1,633	+0.2%
2011	1,785	+9.3%
2021	1,858	+4.1%

Source: Censuses

== Transport ==
Kostomlaty nad Labem is located on the railway line Prague–Nymburk.

== Sights ==
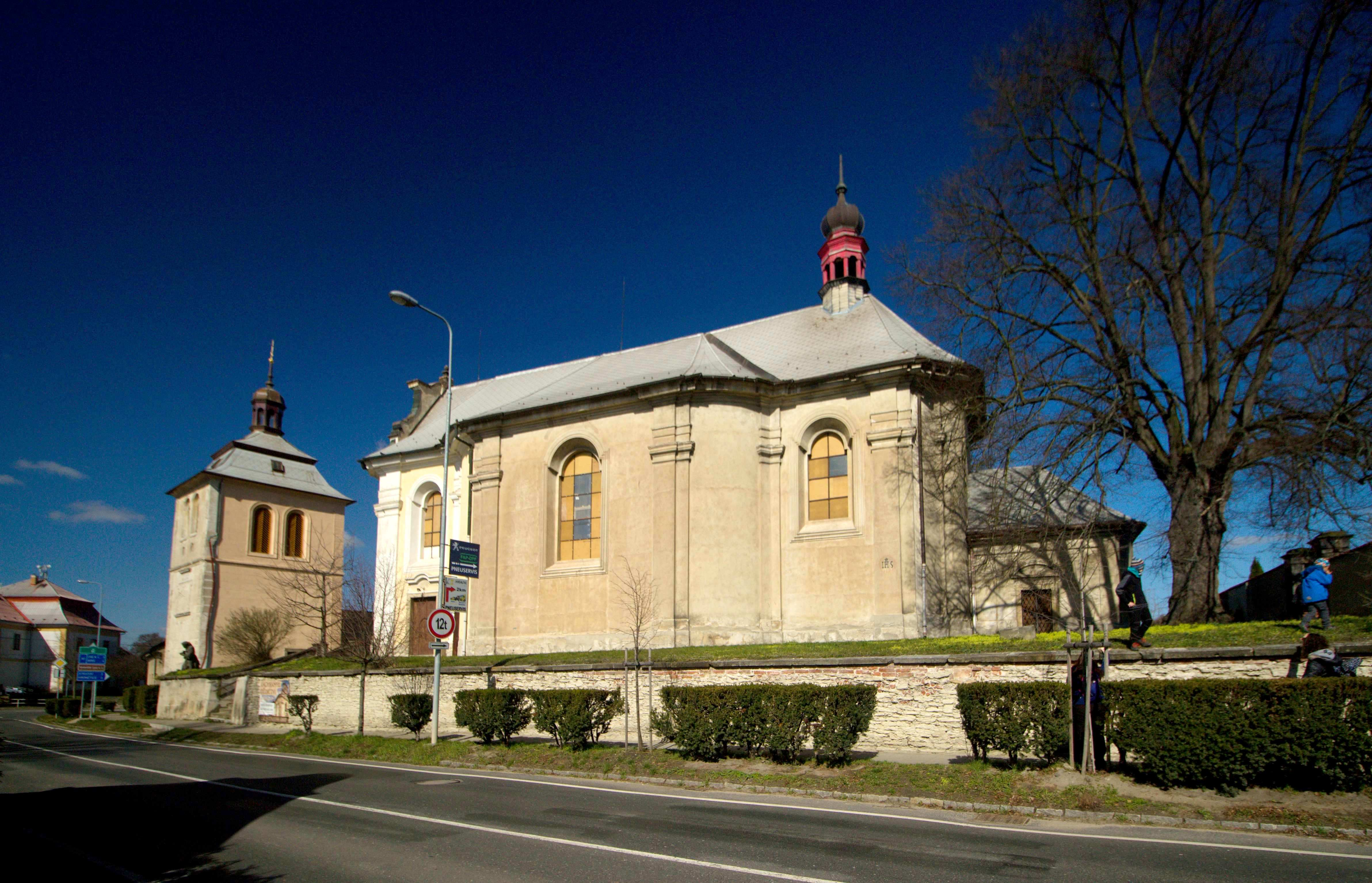
Church of Saint Bartholomew

The main landmark of Kostomlaty nad Labem is the Church of Saint Bartholomew. It was built in the Baroque style in 1778. Next to the church is a separate bell tower.

== Notable people ==
- Bohuslava Kecková (1854–1911), medical doctor; died here
- Antonie Stárová (born 1998), footballer
