= Poles in Bosnia and Herzegovina =

Polonia w Bośni i Hercegowinie Poljaci u Bosni i Hercegovini Пољаци у Босни и Херцеговини

Total population
- 258 (2013); Historically: 526 (1991); 609 (1981); 1,161 (1953) c. 30,000 (1930); 10,975 (1910)

Regions with significant populations
- Sarajevo, Banja Luka, Mostar, Prnjavor, Bosanska Gradiška, Srbac, Derventa

Languages
- Polish, Serbo-Croatian

Religion
- Predominantly Catholic

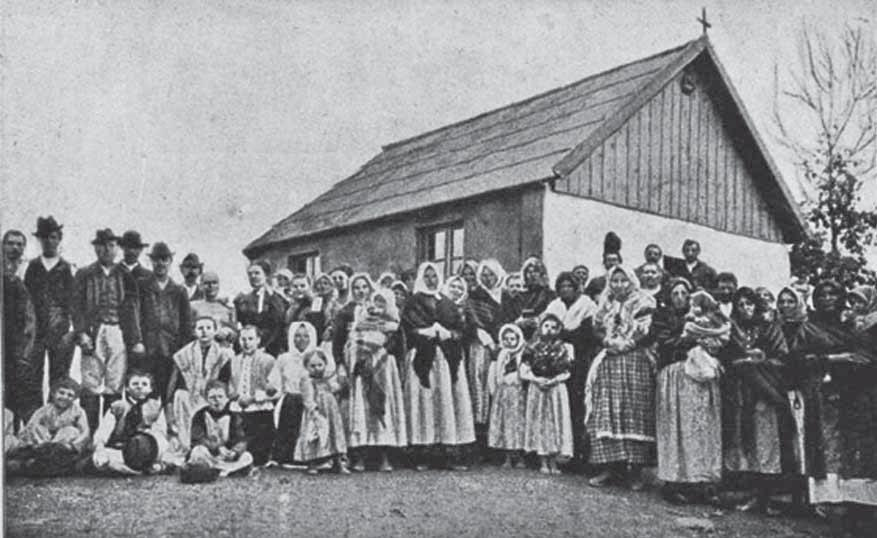
The first Polish immigrants to the village of Celinovac near Gradiška.

Poles are one of 17 constitutionally recognized ethnic minorities in Bosnia and Herzegovina. They arrived during the Austro-Hungarian rule in Bosnia and Herzegovina and settled mostly in the north of Bosnia proper, bringing new technology and skilled manpower. Their destiny was tied closely to that of the Ukrainian minority, with whom they joined the Yugoslav Resistance after the Axis invasion of Yugoslavia. After the Second World War, Bosnian Poles faced difficulties with establishing their rights as a minority as well as persecution by local population and remaining fascist collaborators. This forced a vast majority to answer the Polish government's call for repatriation. There were around 30,000 Poles in Bosnia and Herzegovina in 1930, while their number today is estimated to be less than a thousand, with communities in the major cities of Sarajevo, Banja Luka, Zenica and Mostar.

== Arrival and integration ==
History of Poles in Bosnia begins during the Ottoman rule, but a significant influx only took place following the Austro-Hungarian occupation of Bosnia and Herzegovina in 1878. The occupying authorities wished to colonize the country with politically reliable people, whom they rewarded with land and benefits. Germans and Hungarians were not considered suitable, while Croatians and Serbians were not desirable. The authorities decided on Poles and Czechs, expecting their Slavic roots to help them acclimatize well among Bosniaks. Official settlement lasted from 1896 until 1906. The Polish settlers were predominantly ethnic Roman Catholic farmers from the Kingdom of Galicia and Lodomeria, a crown land of Austria. Along with them came the Eastern Orthodox Ruthenians. Civil servants, physicians, engineers and lawyers, all driven by expectations of fast career advancement and higher wages, were also among Polish settlers. The farmers were settled in the flatlands of Bosanska Krajina and Posavina, mostly in the vicinity of Prnjavor, Derventa, Bosanska Gradiška, Banja Luka, Bosanski Novi and Prijedor. In the areas surrounding Prnjavor and Bosanska Gradiška, there existed villages inhabited solely by Poles; Poles otherwise lived in villages with Bosnian Serbs or, less commonly, in villages with Bosnian Croat majority. The two largest Polish colonies in Bosnia and Herzegovina, Rakovac (Polish: Rakowiec) and Novi Martinac (Nowy Martyniec) near Prnjavor, were formed between 1899 and 1901.

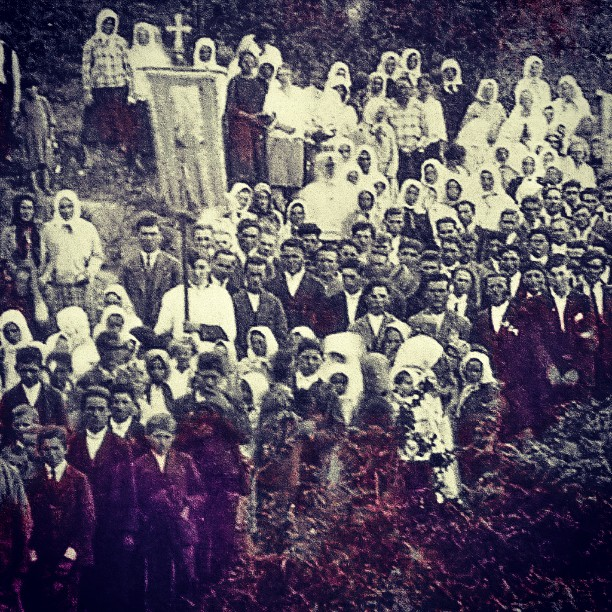
Polish farmers in Bosnia at a procession

The Bosnian Poles were appraised beekeepers and also left a great mark on the country's agriculture, as they introduced synthetic fertilizers and non-food crops in the regions they inhabited. They also taught Bosnians about cattle breeding. The colonists, in turn, were taught to grow maize by the native population and viticulture by another minority, the Italians. The Poles never integrated into the Bosnian society and functioned as a separate ethnic community even in areas where they had direct contact with the Bosnians, their relations consisting of a varying degree of tolerance. The native Bosnians resented the privileges granted to Polish colonists, which caused many disagreements. These benefits lapsed following the First World War, when Austria-Hungary broke apart and Bosnia and Herzegovina was incorporated into the Kingdom of Yugoslavia. Some Poles at the time wanted to move to Poland, but its government refused them.

The 1910 census recorded 10,975 Poles living in Bosnia and Herzegovina; by 1930, Bosnia and Herzegovina was part of the Kingdom of Yugoslavia and numbered around 30,000 Poles. In 1934, the Polish writer Maria Dąbrowska spent some time in Bosnia and Herzegovina and wrote a report about the lives of Bosnian Poles for the authorities of the Second Polish Republic. She focused on their economic and political status, the issue of maintaining their ethnic identity and coexistence with indigenous population. Dąbrowska wrote that as much as 80% were pressured into becoming Yugoslav citizens, which deprived them of the right to appeal to Polish consulates and had an adverse effect on their political status. On the other hand, she noted that Bosnian Poles enjoyed better living conditions than villagers in Poland.

== Second World War ==
During the Second World War, Bosnia and Herzegovina was absorbed into the fascist puppet-state known as the Independent State of Croatia. Its regime organized the transfer of many Bosnian Poles to villages in the adjacent region of Slavonia in order to raise the percentage of Roman Catholics there. Bosnian Poles joined the resistance movement led by the Yugoslav Partisans rather reluctantly, possibly due to a "different treatment by the Germans in Bosnia". The Ukrainians in Bosnia and Herzegovina accepted Polish leadership in this regard. The Partisans were eager to induce both groups and considered it a success when the number of mobilized Poles and Ukrainians from the Prnjavor area rose to 20. In the spring of 1944, a representative of the Polish government-in-exile in Yugoslavia influenced Bosnian Poles to join the Partisans. The latter eventually formed the Initiative Council of Poles to both help the mobilization and by-pass the Polish government representative. Thanks to the council and collaboration of Polish village headsmen, the Yugoslav Partisans founded a so-called Polish Battalion, the 5th Battalion of the 14th Central Bosnian Brigade, on 7 May 1944. It was active in the aeras of Teslić, Žepče, Zavidovići and Zenica. Numbering "a modest 200 ethnic-Polish soldiers", the Battalion helped mobilise other Bosnian Poles, and eventually around 3,000 Poles took part in the liberation of Yugoslavia.

In late 1944, Ignac Kunecki represented Poles at sessions of the State Anti-fascist Council for the National Liberation of Bosnia and Herzegovina (ZAVNOBiH), which sought to restore the borders of Bosnia and Herzegovina (previously divided into banovinas) and make it a federative unit of Yugoslavia. Kunecki cited the precedent of the Second Partition of Poland and its effects on his people. ZAVNOBiH, however, declined his request that the Declaration of the Rights of Citizens of Bosnia and Herzegovina "be amended, so that it emphasizes the equality of national minorities in Bosnia and Herzegovina" because the equivalent declaration by AVNOJ had already done so and because, unlike in Croatia and Vojvodina, "the minorities in Bosnia and Herzegovina are, on the basis of their numbers, insignificant minorities." Despite assurances that they would be "granted full freedom of use of their mother tongue", Polish representatives remained unsatisfied.

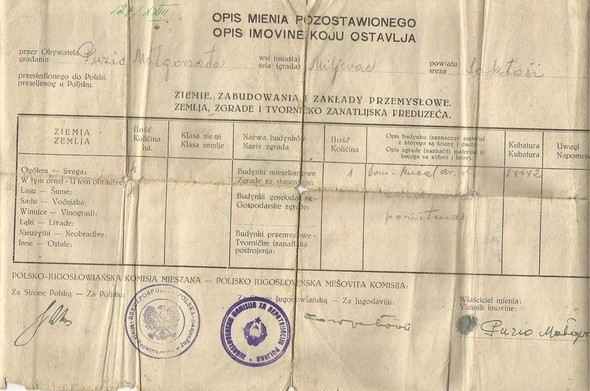
A document listing assets renounced by a Pole during repatriation

Meanwhile, the Polish People's Republic called on Polish diaspora to return and repopulate the areas previously inhabited by Germans. More than 15,000 Poles saw the end of the Second World War in Bosnia and Herzegovina. On 1 July 1945, their representatives held a conference and decided in favour of repatriation. Their emigration was hastened by a terror campaign launched against them and Ukrainians by the Chetniks "with the support of a large part of the Serb population" who "did not view these minorities with sympathy". Thousands of Poles and Ukrainians were expelled from their homes by Chetnik elements in late 1945 and early 1946. A Polish militia, supported by the Yugoslav authorities, was set up to defend the minority following the Polish ambassador's visit to Prnjavor in December 1945, but Kunecki criticized it as ineffective. After notifying the Yugoslav authorities and the Polish embassy in Belgrade, the Polish delegation went to Poland and opted for Bolesławiec County in Lower Silesia. They encountered problems with the Yugoslav government when the latter refused to compensate them for the houses and land they had left behind. The Yugoslav government even demanded that Poland pay for the cattle that the Bosnian Poles took to Poland. The insulted and disappointed Poles appealed directly to the Prime Minister of Yugoslavia Josip Broz Tito. Their transfer from Bosnia and Herzegovina to Poland took place between 28 March and 2 November 1946. By 1953, their numbers had fallen to 1,161, and by 1981, there were 609 Poles living in Bosnia and Herzegovina.

== Present ==
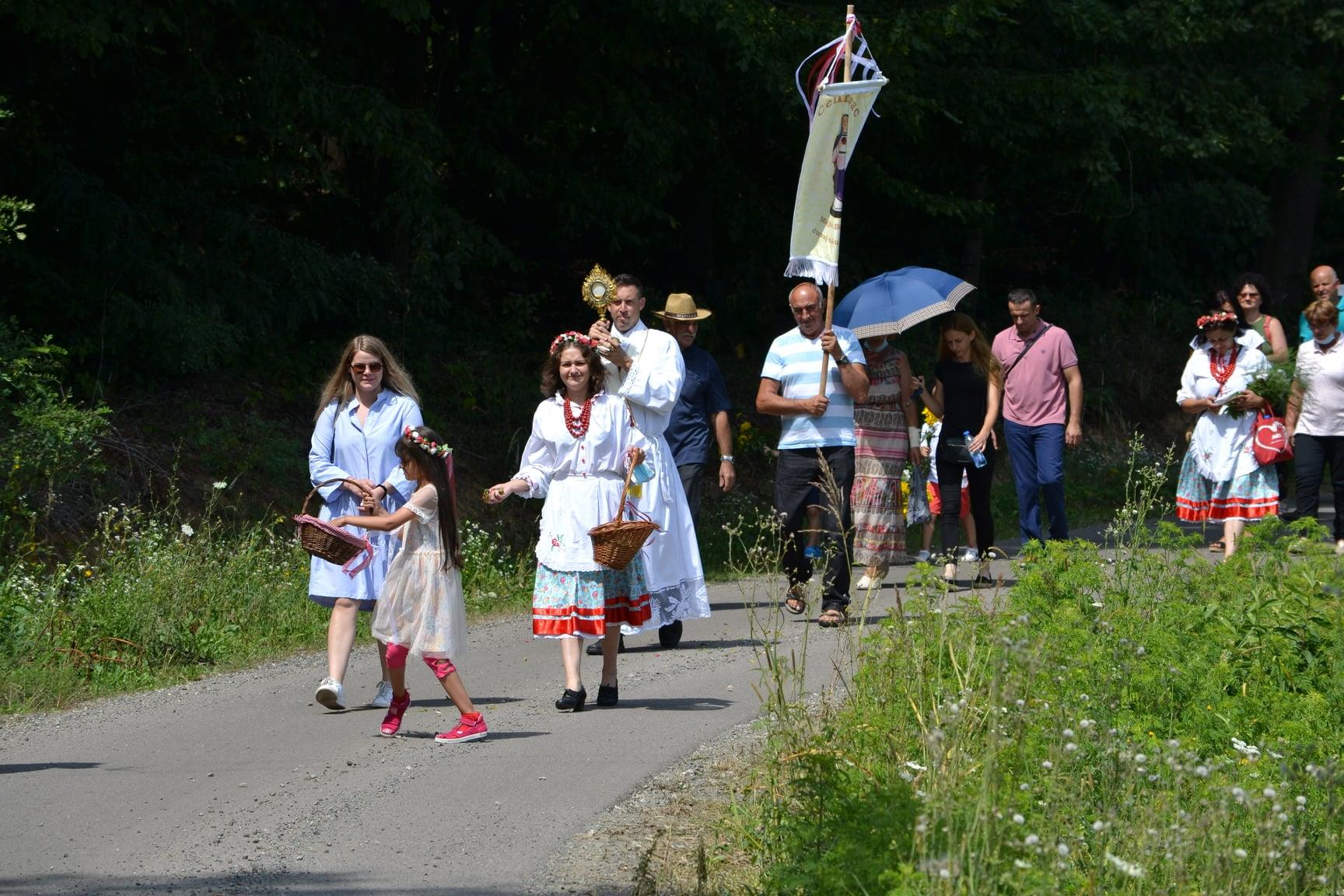
Procession during X Polish festival Pirogijada in Čelinovac, 2020

Bosnian Poles who emigrated and their descendants have held onto certain aspects of Bosnian culture, such as certain songs and burek recipes. They maintain a choir called Tomislav-Osieczov, which occasionally visits Bosnia and Herzegovina. In 1991, there were 526 Poles in Bosnia and Herzegovina. It is estimated that their number today ranges from a few hundred to a thousand. They are organized into four communities, situated in the major cities of Sarajevo, Banja Luka, Zenica and Mostar. Some Poles assimilated into the Bosnian community and their surnames can still be found. According to the 2013 Census there are 258 persons who identify as Poles in Bosnia and Herzegovina.

== Notable individuals ==
Notable Bosnian Poles include:

- Leopold Glück, founder of leprosy treatment centre and chief of staff in Sarajevo hospital
- Bernard Zauderer, founder of the first hospital in Travnik
- Teodora Krajewska, the first gynaecologist in Tuzla, pioneer in research of osteomalacia
- Justyn Karliński, chief sanitary inspector and one of the wealthiest Polish physicians in Bosnia and Herzegovina
- Władysław Lam, Konjic-born painter, graphic designer and art critic
- Wiktor Jankiewicz, lawyer in Tuzla and member of the Diet of Bosnia in Sarajevo
- Ivica Osim, Bosnian football manager

== See also ==
- Polish diaspora
- Ethnic groups in Bosnia and Herzegovina
- Poles in Croatia
