= Vojtěchov (Mšeno) =

Village in the Central Bohemian Region, Czech Republic

- Village
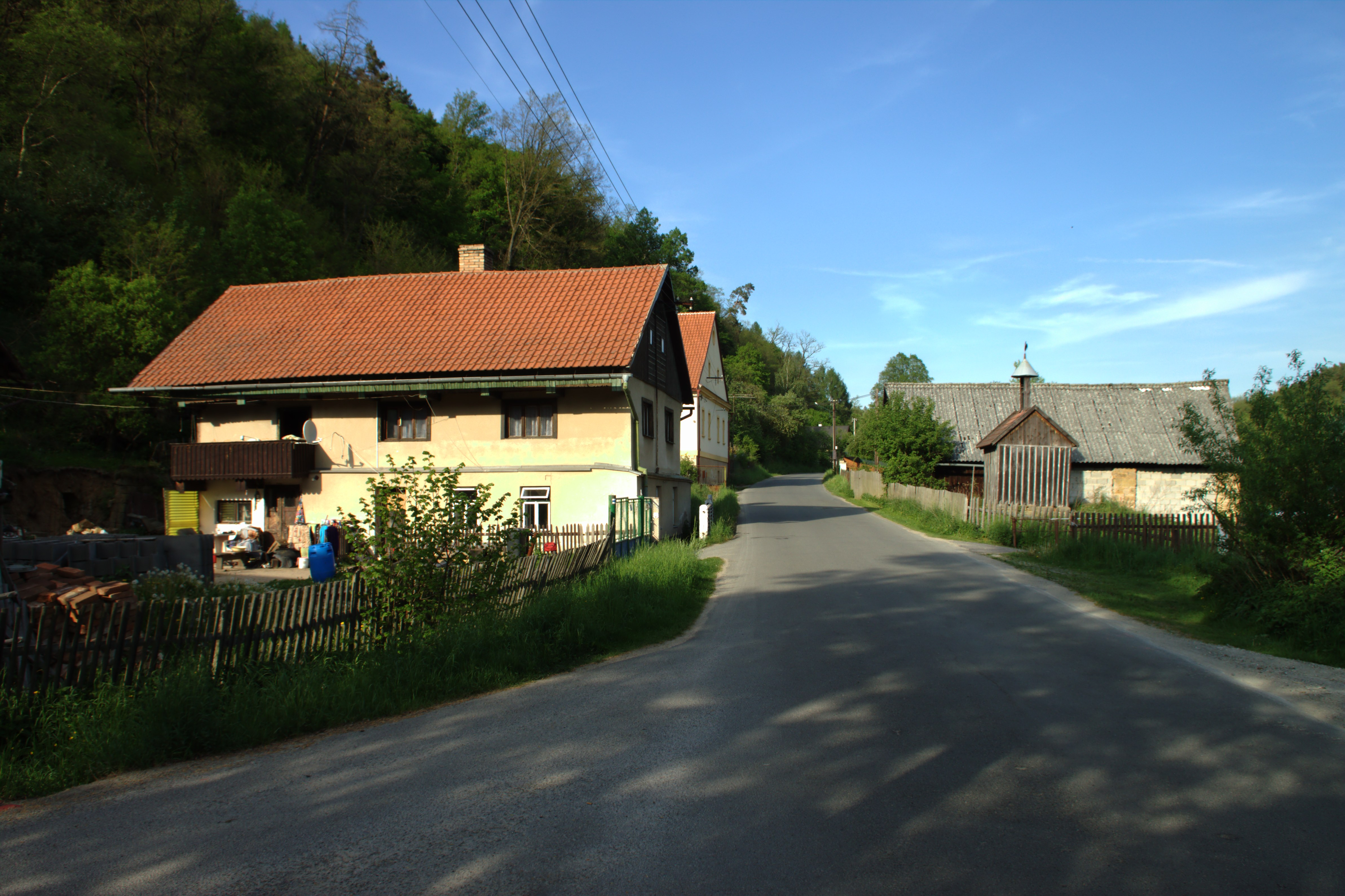
- Main street

- Location in the Czech Republic
- Coordinates: 50°27′43″N 14°36′1″E
- Country: Czech Republic
- Region: Central Bohemian
- District: Mělník
- Municipality: Mšeno
- First mentioned: 1720

Area
  - Total: 0.26 km^{2} (0.10 sq mi)
- Elevation: 250 m (820 ft)

Population (2021)
  - Total: 8
  - Density: 31/km^{2} (80/sq mi)
- Time zone: UTC+1 (CET)
  - Summer (DST): UTC+2 (CEST)
- Postal code: 277 35

Vojtěchov (German: Albertsthal) is a village and municipal part of Mšeno in Mělník District in the Central Bohemian Region of the Czech Republic. As of 2021, it has 8 inhabitants. It lies approximately 3.5 kilometres northwest of Mšeno, in the valley of the Pšovka Stream.

== Geography ==
Vojtěchov is located in the northwestern part of the territory of Mšeno, about 15 kilometres (9 mi) northeast of Mělník and 39 km (24 mi) north of Prague. It lies in the Ralsko Uplands, within the Kokořínsko – Máchův kraj Protected Landscape Area. The village is situated in the valley of the Pšovka Stream, here called Vojtěšský důl, at an elevation of approximately 250 metres above sea level.

== History ==
The first written mention of the village dates from 1720. It was founded in the 18th century on the orders of Knight Beneda as part of the Stránka estate; a brewery operated in the village at that time.

Before World War II, the majority of the village's population was German-speaking. After the war, the German inhabitants were expelled from Czechoslovakia.

From establishment of independent municipalities in 1850 until 1960, Vojtěchov was a hamlet of the municipality of Olešno (today a part of Mšeno). It belonged first to Dubá District, then in 1950–1960 to Doksy District. Since 1961, it has been a municipal part of Mšeno in Mělník District.

== Demographics ==
At the census of 1921, the village had 78 inhabitants, comprising 18 Czechoslovaks, 58 Germans, and 2 foreign nationals. With the exception of four Protestants, one member of an unrecorded denomination, and three people without religious affiliation, all residents were Roman Catholic.

Historical population

| Year | Pop. | ±% |
|---|---|---|
| 1869 | 149 | — |
| 1880 | 130 | −12.8% |
| 1890 | 106 | −18.5% |
| 1900 | 101 | −4.7% |
| 1910 | 91 | −9.9% |

| Year | Pop. | ±% |
|---|---|---|
| 1921 | 78 | −14.3% |
| 1930 | 69 | −11.5% |
| 1950 | 25 | −63.8% |
| 1961 | 22 | −12.0% |
| 1970 | 24 | +9.1% |

| Year | Pop. | ±% |
|---|---|---|
| 1980 | 24 | +0.0% |
| 1991 | 18 | −25.0% |
| 2001 | 11 | −38.9% |
| 2011 | 9 | −18.2% |
| 2021 | 8 | −11.1% |

Source: Censuses

== Notable people ==
- Anna Bayerová (1853–1924), medical doctor
