= Bohuslava Kecková =

Czech medical doctor

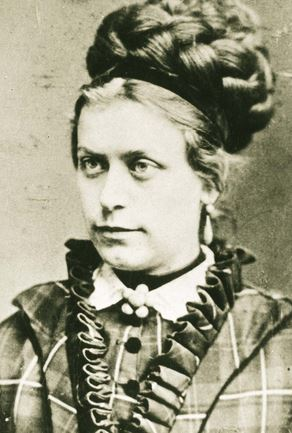
- Born: Bohuslava Josefa Kecková; 18 March 1854; Bukol, Bohemia, Austrian Empire
- Died: 17 October 1911 (aged 57); Kostomlaty nad Labem, Bohemia, Austria-Hungary
- Other name: Bohuslava Keck
- Occupation: medical doctor
- Years active: 1880–1911

Bohuslava Kecková (18 March 1854 – 17 October 1911) was a Czech medical doctor. She was the first woman in the Czech lands (now the Czech Republic) who did earn a secondary diploma and subsequently a medical degree.

Unable to study medicine (closed for women in those times), after completing her secondary education she left Austria-Hungary for study in the University of Zurich and earn a medical degree there in 1880. But after returning home she was unable to obtain an official recognition of her academic degree thus she could not to open a private medical practice for the next 12 years. So she established herself at least in the field of obstetrics. In 1893, at the invitation of the Austro-Hungarian government, she arrived in Bosnia and Herzegovina where for the next almost two decades worked in the responsible role of the provincial chief medical doctor for the female part of the population, especially among the local Muslim women. She helped to promote modern medical approaches and procedures in the backward milieu there. From 1900, she also taught health classes at the girls' high school in Mostar and wrote articles on health themes which appeared in Czech women's magazines.

== Early life ==
Bohuslava Josefa Kecková was born on 18 March 1854 in village Bukol in Bohemia, Austrian Empire (now a part of Vojkovice, Czech Republic) to Johanna "Jana" (née Kubíčková) and Adolf Kecka. She was the middle daughter in a family composed of three girls. Her father had inherited a farm, but worked professionally in publishing. During her childhood, the farm was sold and the family moved to Karlín, then eastern suburb of Prague, where her father had a successful construction and building firm. Kecková graduated in 1870 with the class award from the Girls' High School of Prague. Because she excelled in her studies, she received a special permit from the Ministry of Culture and Teaching to attend and take exams from the lower gymnasium in Malá Strana quarter and then attended the upper classes at the same school from which she matriculated on 24 July 1874. Her graduation created a sensation, as she was the first woman to earn a secondary schooling diploma in Czech lands.

That same October, she enrolled in the medical faculty at the University of Zurich, Switzerland, because medical studies were not open to women in Bohemia, where she was joined in 1875 by fellow countrywoman, Anna Bayerová. The two women did not get along well and Bayerová left Zurich before her graduation to finish her schooling in Bern in 1881.

In her final year of studies, Kecková was appointed as an assistant in the women's clinic at the University Hospital of Zürich. She graduated on 4 August 1880, the first woman of Czech heritage to earn the title of doctor with a thesis O řezu průdušnice při nádorech na krku (The tracheal section of the throat and neck). Her plan to return to Prague, publish her dissertation and open a medical practice met strong opposition from male colleagues. Though she had been left an inheritance by her father for opening a practice, she tried for two years, using pressure from influential friends and women's groups to register on the list of doctors, but was unable to do so. Intervention by a professor at the Medical Faculty in Prague who sent her request to the Ministry of Culture and Teaching was also ignored, with claims that her certification had been received abroad and not in Austria-Hungary. Kecková's requests to be allowed to be examined at the University of Prague were also rejected. She hired a lawyer and appealed to the Supreme Court of Justice in Vienna. Based upon the fact that Austrian women were neither allowed to be students at university and thus, could not attain a doctorate, her request was rejected. Since working in her chosen field was denied unless she moved outside the country, Kecková returned to school, taking courses in gynecology and midwifery at the medical faculty of the University of Vienna.

== Career ==
After her graduation, Kecková returned to Karlín and opened a practice as a midwife in 1883. Her practice quickly expanded, including women of all social classes and eventually she moved it to Prague. After practicing for almost a decade, in 1892, the government posted for applicants for two medical doctor positions which had openings in Bosnia and Herzegovina. Because men were not allowed to touch Muslim women, the posts were only open to women. Of the six applicants, Kecková was appointed to serve in Mostar and Polish medical doctor Teodora Krajewska was sent to Tuzla. She arrived on 11 January 1893 in Mostar and was officially accepted as the temporary medical officer. She successfully treated Mufti Ali Effendi Džabiči, a local Muslim leader's wife, overcoming the initial distrust of the local population and her clientele expanded. Kecková found conditions which were completely different to what she was used to. Male doctors had to diagnose medical problems without touching their female patients or examining them. Women were kept in seclusion in the harem and knew nothing of hygiene or nutrition, having no access to education.

Kecková combined treatment with health education and wrote articles which she sent back to Bohemia describing her medical rounds, which she made with two assistants and a driver, by rail, horse and finally walking to her patients. Kecková treated the sick, gave them vaccinations, and also presented educational lectures, gathering statistical information about the population. One study which required her to travel to various villages over a six-week period focused on syphilis in women. Kecková's statistical compilations included etiological data on the Bosniaks including customs, diet, housing, lifestyle, population and religious belief, as she was hoping to convey information which would diminish stereotypical prejudices and create an environment that would lead to preventive action for improved education and health. In 1896, the position was made permanent and in 1900, she began teaching health at the Girl's High School of Mostar. Her classes included instruction on anatomy and practical nursing. She taught and submitted articles in Croatian. Her articles appeared in Czech newspapers like Ženské listy ("Women's Papers") and Lada on such topics as abusive drinking, malnutrition and tuberculosis from 1897 to 1910.

== Death and legacy ==
As she aged, Kecková had a series of health problems related to diabetes and made frequent trips to Karlovy Vary for recuperation. On one such trip, she cut her trip short and went to visit her sister in Kostomlaty nad Labem, where she died on 17 October 1911.
