= Dolní Bousov =

- Town
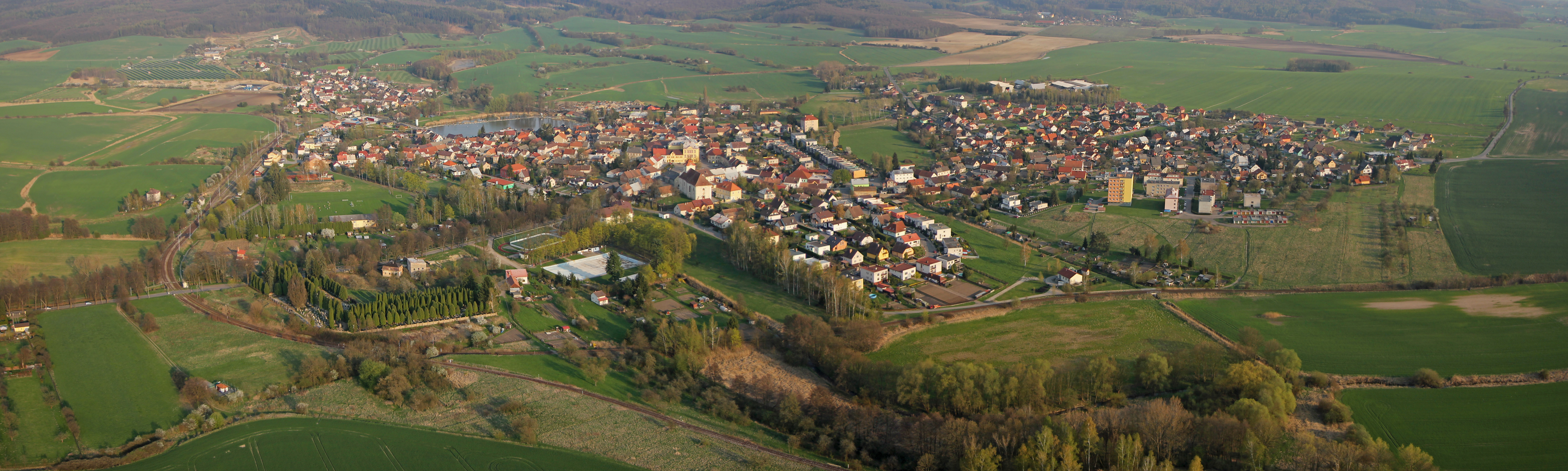
- Aerial view

- Flag Coat of arms

- Location in the Czech Republic
- Coordinates: 50°26′17″N 15°7′41″E
- Country: Czech Republic
- Region: Central Bohemian
- District: Mladá Boleslav
- First mentioned: 1318

Government
  - Mayor: Miroslav Boček

Area
  - Total: 24.31 km^{2} (9.39 sq mi)
- Elevation: 246 m (807 ft)

Population (2026-01-01)
  - Total: 3,059
  - Density: 125.8/km^{2} (325.9/sq mi)
- Time zone: UTC+1 (CET)
  - Summer (DST): UTC+2 (CEST)
- Postal code: 294 04
- Website: www.dolni-bousov.cz

Dolní Bousov (Czech pronunciation: [ˈdolɲiː ˈbousof]) is a town in Mladá Boleslav District in the Central Bohemian Region of the Czech Republic. It has about 3,100 inhabitants. The town is located on the Klenice River in the Jičín Uplands.

== Administrative division ==
Dolní Bousov consists of seven municipal parts (in brackets population according to the 2021 census):

- Dolní Bousov (2,236)
- Bechov (121)
- Horní Bousov (173)
- Ošťovice (16)
- Střehom (37)
- Svobodín (72)
- Vlčí Pole (202)

Svobodín forms an exclave of the municipal territory.

== Etymology ==
The name Bousov (initially written as Búsov) is derived from the personal name Bous (Bús), meaning "Bous' (court)". Originally, Dolní Bousov was called just Bousov and the nearby village of Horní Bousov was called Bousovec (diminutive form of Bousov). In the 15th century, they began to be called Dolní ('lower') and Horní ('upper') based on their location.

== Geography ==
Dolní Bousov is located about 15 kilometres (9 mi) east of Mladá Boleslav and 57 km (35 mi) northeast of Prague. It lies in the Jičín Uplands. The highest point is the hill Hladoměř at 377 m (1,237 ft) above sea level, located on the southern municipal border.

The Klenice River flows through the town. It supplies a system of fishponds, the largest of which is Červenský rybník with an area of 45 ha (110 acres).

== History ==
The first written mention of Bousov is from 1318. The wooden church of Saint Catherine was documented in 1352. Before 1497, Dolní Bousov was promoted to a town. The town flourished during the rule of the Lobkowicz family at the end of the 16th century. In 1600, Emperor Rudolf II granted Dolní Bousov a coat of arms and several privileges.

At the end of the Thirty Years' War, the town was burned down by the Swedish troops. After the war, the town was acquired by the Czernin family and development continued. Further economic development occurred in the 19th century, when the imperial road from Mladá Boleslav to Sobotka was opened in 1842 and the railway in 1883.

== Demographics ==
Historical population

Year	Pop.	±%
1869	3,167	—
1880	3,285	+3.7%
1890	3,121	−5.0%
1900	2,995	−4.0%
1910	2,806	−6.3%

Year	Pop.	±%
1921	3,099	+10.4%
1930	2,913	−6.0%
1950	2,374	−18.5%
1961	2,587	+9.0%
1970	2,526	−2.4%

Year	Pop.	±%
1980	2,368	−6.3%
1991	2,207	−6.8%
2001	2,291	+3.8%
2011	2,541	+10.9%
2021	2,857	+12.4%

Source: Censuses

== Transport ==
Dolní Bousov is located on the railway lines Všetaty–Mladějov and Mladá Boleslav–Sobotka.

There is an experimental railway line between Dolní Bousov and Kopidlno, on which an autonomous train was put into operation in 2025, the first on a free track in Europe.

== Sights ==
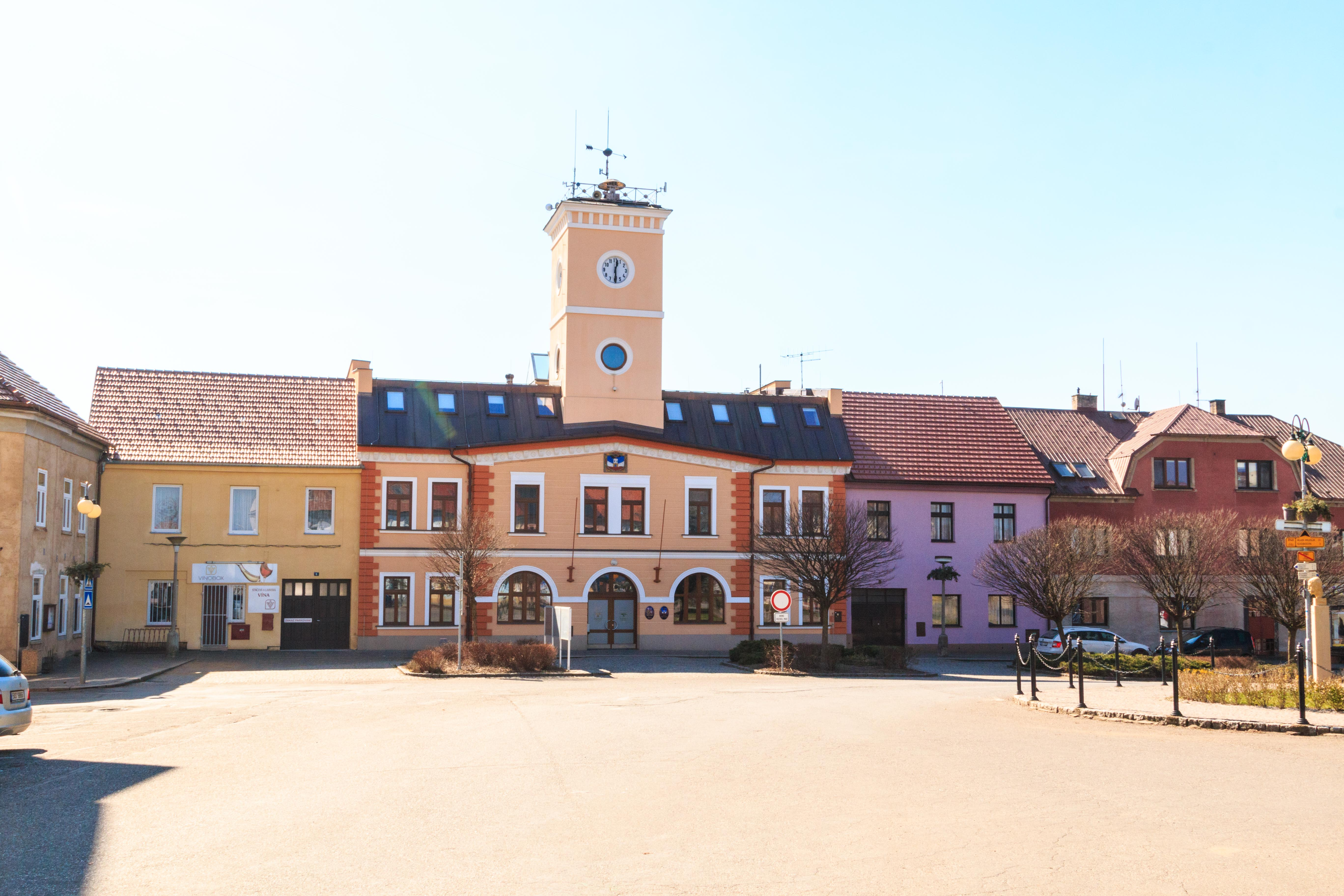
Town hall

The most valuable building is the Church of Saint Catherine. The current Baroque church was built in 1759–1760.

The main landmarks of the town square are the Empire town hall from 1861, and the Marian column from the 18th century in the middle of the square.

The folk architecture in Střehom is well preserved and the village is protected as a village monument zone. The most valuable building in Střehom is a Renaissance mill.

== Notable people ==
- Eugen Wratislaw von Mitrowitz (1786–1867), Austrian field marshal
