= Anna Bayerová =

Czech medical doctor

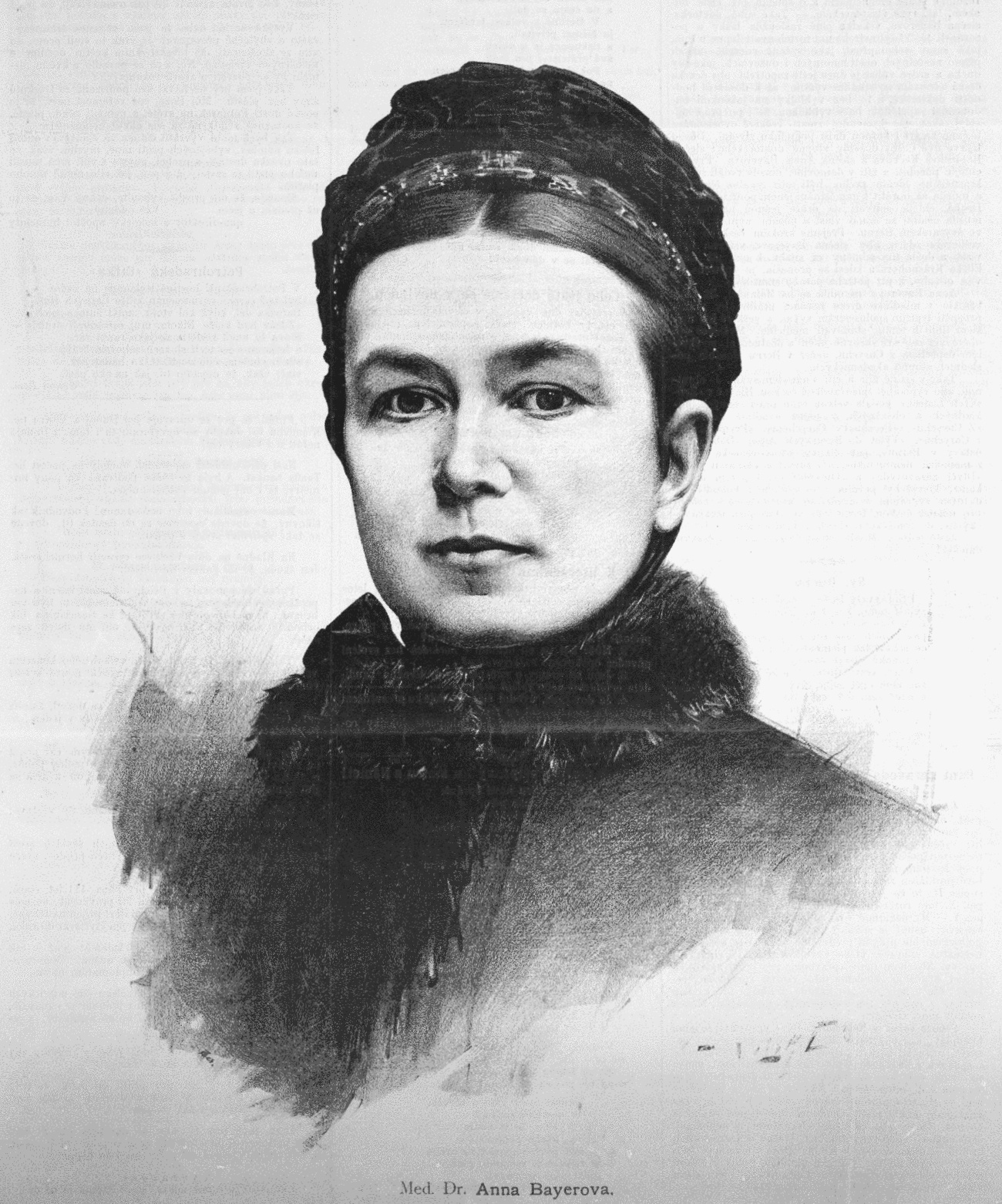
- Portrait of Bayerová by Jan Vilímek (1889)
- Born: 4 November 1853; Vojtěchov, Bohemia, Austrian Empire
- Died: 24 January 1924 (aged 70); Prague, Czechoslovakia
- Education: University of Bern
- Occupation: Medical doctor

Anna Bayerová (4 November 1853 – 24 January 1924) was a Czech medical doctor. She is known as the second Czech female medical doctor (after Bohuslava Kecková). Both of them were prevented from practicing as medical doctors in their own country so Kecková became a Czech midwife, whereas Bayerová had a medical practise in Bern.

== Biography ==
Bayerová was born in Vojtěchov in Bohemia, Austrian Empire (now part of Mšeno, Czech Republic) on 4 November 1853, the youngest child of Josef and Marie Bayer. She attended school in Mělník until 1868, when she moved to Prague, where she met the authors Eliška Krásnohorská and Sofie Podlipská, and took gymnasial exams, despite not being allowed to attend the gymnasium.

In 1875, Bayerová moved to Zurich and started attending classes at the University of Zurich. However, she suffered financial problems and returned home in 1878. Eventually, after receiving money to continue her studies, Anna Bayerová graduated from the University of Bern and thus became the second female Czech medical doctor in 1881. However, like the first female Czech medical doctor (Bohuslava Kecková, who graduated in 1880 from the University of Zurich), Bayerová graduated from a Swiss university rather than a Czech one, and had to practice abroad as her doctorate was not recognized by her homeland. The third woman doctor was Anna Honzáková. Bayerová graduated from the University of Bern and was the first to practice successfully. She established her own private practice in Bern whereas Bohuslava Kecková had the first qualification she became a Czech midwife.

In 1889, Bayerová's achievement was recognised by popular support. 700 women wrote an open letter to her and the women's magazine Ženské listy. The letter hoped that she could return as they wanted to see female doctors in their country.

She died on 24 January 1924 in Prague, at the age of 70. She is buried at the Olšany Cemetery.

In her hometown there is a street named in her honour.
