= List of first women medical doctors by country =

This is a list of the first qualified female physician to practice in each country, where that is known. Many, if not all, countries have had female physicians since time immemorial; however, modern systems of qualification have often commenced as male only, whether de facto or de jure. This lists the first women physicians in modern countries. The dates given in parentheses below are the dates the women graduated from medical school.

== Africa ==
Country	Physician	Year graduated medical school	Year began practice
Algeria	Aldjia Noureddine-Benallègue	1946	1946
Angola	Melba Dias Costa		1950
Benin	Solange Faladé	1955	
Botswana	Nolwandle Nozipo Mashalaba		1965
Burkina Faso	Bibiane Kone		
Burundi	Marcelline Ntakibirora	1982	1983
Cameroon	Gladys Ejomi	1962	
Cape Verde	Maria Francisca de Oliveira Sousa		
Chad	Grace Kodindo		1977
Comoros	Zaitouni Abdou		
Democratic Republic of Congo	Louise Celia Fleming	1895	1895
Egypt	Hilana Sedarous	1930	1930
Equatorial Guinea	Margarita Roka Elobo		
Eswatini	Fanny Friedman		
Ethiopia	Widad Kidanemariam		c. 1960s
Gambia	Kinneh Sogur	2007	
Ghana	Susan Ofori-Atta	1949	1949
Ivory Coast	Christiane Welffens-Ekra		c. 1975
Kenya	Mary de Sousa		1919
Lesotho	Bertha Hardegger (born in Switzerland)		1937
Liberia	Florence Gbeye D. McClain		1962
Libya	Younes Qwaider	1969	
Madagascar	Marthe Ramiaramanana-Ralivao	1950	
Malawi	Vida Mungwira (the country was then known as Nyasaland)	1961	1962
Mali	Diaka Diawara Sacko		
Mauritania	Nusaiba Abdel-Qader and Meimouna mint Mohamed Lemine	2015	2015
Mauritius	Sajeda Vayid	1965	
Morocco	Françoise Legey (born in France)	1900	1909
Namibia	Libertina Amathila	1969	1969
Nigeria	Elizabeth Abimbola Awoliyi	1938	1938
Republic of Congo	Yvonne Obenga		c. 1970s
São Tomé and Príncipe	Julieta da Graça do Espírito Santo		1955
Senegal	Marie-Thérèse Basse	1957	1958
Seychelles	Hilda Stevenson-Delhomme		1939
Sierra Leone	Irene Ighodaro	1945	
Somalia	Hawa Abdi	1971	1971
South Africa	Jane Elizabeth Waterston	1880	
Sudan	Khalida Zahir	1952	1952
Sudan	Zarouhi Sarkissian	1952	
Tanzania	Esther Mwaikambo	1969	1969
Tunisia	Tewhida Ben Sheikh	1936	1936
Uganda	Josephine Nambooze (Note: Although Nambooze practiced medicine in Uganda, she is considered the first female physician in Central Africa (which includes the Central African Republic, Gabon, and Rwanda) and East Africa (which includes Djibouti, Eritrea, Mozambique and South Sudan))	1959	1962
Zambia	Elwyn Chomba	1973	
Zimbabwe	Madeline Nyamwanza-Makonese	1970	1970

== Americas ==
Country	Physician	Year graduated medical school	Year began practice
Antigua and Barbuda	Ruby Lake-Richards	1954	1954
Argentina	Cecilia Grierson	1889	1889
Bahamas	Merceline Dahl-Regis (Note: According to various sources, Dahl-Regis is considered one of the first women to graduate with a medical degree during the 1960s.)	c. 1960s	
Bolivia	Amelia Chopitea Villa	1926	1929
Brazil	Marie Durocher	1834	1834
Canada	Emily Stowe	1867 1875	1867 1875
Canada	Jennie Kidd Trout	1875	1875
Chile	Eloísa Díaz	1886	1887
Colombia	Ana Galvis Hotz	1877	1877
Costa Rica	Anita Figueredo (lived in the U.S.)	1936	
Cuba	Laura Martínez de Carvajal	1889	1889
Dominican Republic	Sarah Loguen Fraser (Note: Although Fraser was the first woman authorized to practice medicine in the Dominican Republic in 1884, Andrea Evangelina Rodríguez Perozo was the first woman to earn her medical degree in the Dominican Republic in 1909.)		1884
Ecuador	Matilde Hidalgo	1921	1921
El Salvador	Estela Gavidia	1945	1945
Guatemala	María Isabel Escobar	1942	1946
Guyana	Asin Ho A Shoo (Hoashoo)	1912	1912
Haiti	Yvonne Sylvain	1940	1940
Honduras	Martha Raudales de Midence	1947	1947
Jamaica	Cicely Williams	1923	1923
Mexico	Matilde Montoya	1887	1887
Nicaragua	Concepción Palacios Herrera	1927	1928
Panamá	Lidia Gertrudis Sogandares	1934	1936
Paraguay	Gabriela Valenzuela and Froilana Mereles	1924	
Peru	Laura Esther Rodriguez Dulanto	1899	1900
Saint Kitts and Nevis	Jean Lenore Harney		
Saint Lucia	Betty Bennet Wells	1939	
Suriname	Sophie Redmond	1935	1935
Trinidad and Tobago	Stella Abidh	1930	
United States	Elizabeth Blackwell (born in England)	1849	1851
Uruguay	Paulina Luisi	1908	1909
Venezuela	Lya Imber	1936	1936

== Asia ==
Country	Physician	Year graduated medical school	Year began practice
Afghanistan	Maghul M. Ali	1957	1957
Azerbaijan	Sona Valikhan	1908	1908
Bahrain	Sadeeqa Ali Al-Awadi	1969	
Bangladesh	Zohra Begum Kazi	1935	
Brunei	Datin Paduka Dr Hjh Intan		
Cambodia	Kek Galabru	1968	1968
China	Kin Yamei (Note: Buwei Yang Chao was considered the first female doctor in China to specialize in Western medicine.)	1885	1885
India	Anandi Gopal Joshi / Kadambini Ganguly	1886	
Indonesia	Marie Thomas	1912	1922
Iran	Sakineh Peri		1934
Iraq	Anna Sethian		1922
Japan	Ogino Ginko	1882	1885
Jordan	Nirmen Totanji	1953	1953
Korea	Esther Park (Kim Jeom-dong)	1900	
Kyrgyzstan	Kakish Ryskulovna Ryskulova	1944	1944
Kuwait	Eleanor Jane Taylor Calverley (born in the U.S.)	1908	1911
Lebanon	Anisa Saiba	c. 1890s	c. 1890s
Malaysia	Salma Ismail	1947	1947
Mongolia	V. Ichinkhorloo	1947	
Myanmar	Daw Saw Sa	1912	
Nepal	Jamila Sen	1897	1899
Oman	Zakiyyah Bint Salem Bin Seif Al Me'man	1944	
Pakistan	Khabzam Iqbal	c. 1983	
Philippines	Honoria Acosta-Sison	1909	1909
Saudi Arabia	Nawal Jamal Al-Lail		
Singapore	Lee Choo Neo	1919	1919
Sri Lanka	May Ratnayake	1916	1916
Syria	Sabat Islambouli	1890	1890
Taiwan	Tsai Ah-hsin	1921	1925
Tajikistan	Sofya Khafizovna Khakimova	1943	1943
Thailand	Margaret Lin Xavier	1924	1924
United Arab Emirates	Zulekha Daoud		1963
Uzbekistan	Zulfiya Ibragimovna Umidova	1922	1922
Vietnam	Henriette Bùi Quang Chiêu	1934	
Yemen	Claudie Fayein (born in France)		1955

- Nepal: Bethel Fleming (born in the United States) is considered the first Western female physician to practice in the country.

== Europe ==
Country	Physician	Year graduated medical school	Year began practice
Albania	Xhanfize (Frashëri) Basha		1937
Armenia	Vergine G. Mikaelyan	1927	
Austria	Gabriele Possanner	1897	1897
Belarus	Salome Regina Rusetskaya (Note: Salome Regina Rusetskaya never received any formal medical education.)		
Belgium	Isala Van Diest	1879	1879
Bosnia and Herzegovina	Teodora Krajewska		c. 1897
Bulgaria	Anastasia Golovina	1878	1878
Croatia	Karola Maier Milobar	1900	1906
Cyprus	Maria Michaelides	1927	1927
Czech Republic	Anna Honzáková	1902	1902
Denmark	Nielsine Nielsen	1886	1889
Estonia	Selma Feldbach	1904	
Finland	Rosina Heikel	1878	1878
France	Madeleine Brès	1875	1875
Georgia (country)	Pelagia Natsvlishvili	1878	1878
Germany	Dorothea Erxleben	1754	1754
Greece	Maria Kalapothakes	1894	1894
Hungary	Vilma Hugonnai	1879	1897
Iceland	Kristín Ólafsdóttir	1917	1918
Ireland	Eleanora Fleury	1890	1890
Italy	Dorotea Bucca (Note: First woman doctor in modern Italy was Ernestina Paper in 1877.)	pre-1390	
Kazakhstan	Gulsum Asfendiyarova and Zeinep Sadykovna. (Note: Jankümis Bayğozïna graduated from a medical school in 1885, but that was as an obstetrician.)	1908	
Latvia	Marija Vecrumba	1911	1911
Lithuania	Barbora Burbaitė-Eidukevičienė	1892	1900
Luxembourg	Louise Welter (Note: Although Marcelle Dauphin is considered Luxembourg's first female doctor in certain sources, she was actually a dentist. Welter was the first female general practitioner physician.)	1924	1924
Malta	Blanche Huber	1925	1925
Moldova	Maria Baltaga-Savitski	1879	
Montenegro	Divna Veković	1940s	
Netherlands	Aletta Jacobs	1879	1879
North Macedonia	Suncica Apostolova	1953	
Norway	Marie Spångberg Holth	1893	1893
Poland	Anna Tomaszewicz-Dobrska	1877	1877
Portugal	Elisa Augusta da Conceição Andrade	1889	1889
Romania	Maria Cuțarida-Crătunescu	1884	1891
Russia	Nadezhda Suslova	1867	1868
Serbia	Draga Ljočić	1879	1881
Slovakia	Mária Bellová	1910	
Slovenia	Eleonora Jenko Groyer	1907	
Spain	Dolors Aleu i Riera	1879	1882
Sweden	Lovisa Åhrberg (Note: First Swedish woman doctor who graduated from a University was Charlotte Yhlen, and first woman doctor to graduate from a Swedish University was Karolina Widerström.)	Never educated; certified 1850s	1840
Switzerland	Marie Heim-Vögtlin	1874	1874
Turkey	Safiye Ali		1922
Ukraine	Sofia Okunevska	1894	1897
United Kingdom	Elizabeth Garrett Anderson	1862	1865

== Oceania ==
Country	Physician	Year graduated medical school	Year began practice
Australia	Constance Stone		1890
Fiji	Kanta Madovji	1968	
Kiribati	Terenganuea Taaram (then known as the Gilbert and Ellice Islands Colony)		before 1974
Micronesia	Ulai Otobed	1965	
New Zealand	Emily Siedeberg	1896	1905
Papua New Guinea	Joan Refshauge		1947
Samoa	Viopapa Annandale-Atherton	1964	
Solomon Islands	Junilyn Pikacha	1978	1981
Tonga	'Akanesi Makakaufaki	1976	
Tuvalu	Nese Ituaso-Conway		1999
Tuvalu	Miliama Simeona		1999

== See also ==
- List of first female pharmacists by country
- List of first women dentists by country
- Women in dentistry
- Women in medicine
