= Khakimova =

Khakimova is a surname. Notable people with the surname include:

- Julia Khakimova (born 1981), Russian fencer
- Kubaro Khakimova (born 2002), Uzbekistani para-athlete
- Malika Khakimova (born 1996), Uzbekistani fencer
- Sofya Khafizovna Khakimova (1924–2015), Tajikistani physician
