= The Bird from the Land of Gabour =

Moroccan folktale about a calumniated wife and her wondrous children

The Bird from the Land of Gabour (Arabic: Ṭîr El-Gabouri, French: L'oiseau du pays de Gabour) is a Moroccan folktale collected by author Françoise Legey and published in the early 20th century, sourced from a informant from Marrakesh. It is related to the theme of the calumniated wife and classified in the international Aarne-Thompson-Uther Index as type ATU 707, "The Three Golden Children". These tales refer to stories where a girl promises a king she will bear a child or children with wonderful attributes, but her jealous relatives or the king's wives plot against the babies and their mother. Variants are collected across Morocco.

== Summary ==
Four women talk in the woods in front of the king's garden: the first promises to feed his troops (méḥalla, in the original) with only a plate of couscous, the second that she can sate the thirst of the troops with only a bucket of water, the third that she can weave head coverings (ḥaïk, in the original) for the troops with the hair of one horse only, and the fourth that she can bear the king a boy with a lock of silver and a girl with tresses of gold ("Nweld Lih would Zekkoura Enta 'Noqra ou Bent Guettaïta Enta 't Dhehb", in the original). The king summons all four women for them to display their talents: the first woman prepares two plates of couscous, a meagre one for the army and a delicious one for the king; the second woman is given a bucket of hot water which the horses do not drink from, but she lies to the king they did; and the third woman sews a haïk with her own hair. The three women are relegated to the king's harem, while he marries the fourth woman.

The fourth woman, who has become the official queen, earns the jealousy of the other three, who hire a wise woman to help them in their revenge: the wise woman poses as a midwife and takes the twins as soon as they are born, replaces them for puppies and casts them in the water. They are saved and raised by a fisherman and his wife. Years later, after their adoptive parents die, while going to the mosque, the girl is approached by an old woman, who insists to be her servant. She is brought to their palace, and she tells the girl the palace is beautiful, but lacks several items: on the first quest, the old woman tells about two jets of water, water of roses and water from orange blossoms; on the second quest, the water that "youyoute" ("makes sounds of joy"); on the third quest, the laughing pomegranate; on the fourth quest, the dancing reed. The brother simply delivers the items to the sister.

Later, the old woman tells them about the Ṭîr El-Gabouri, a bird from the land of Gabour, which can sing in their garden. The brother goes to the ends of the Earth and meets a Ghoul, who directs him to the bird. The brother fails and is petrified; the sister follows him, catches the bird and disenchants her brother and several others that were petrified by the bird. Lastly, the same old woman tells them to invite the king to their garden. The bird Ṭîr El-Gabouri reveals the truth to the king in the siblings' garden.

== Analysis ==
=== Tale type ===
The tale is classified in the international Aarne-Thompson-Uther Index as type ATU 707, "The Three Golden Children": three sisters converse among themselves about their plans to marry the king, the youngest promising to bear children with wondrous aspect; the king decides to marry the youngest (or all three), and the youngest bears the wondrous children, who are taken from her and cast in the water by the jealous aunts; years later, the children, after many adventures, reunite the family, which leads to the aunts being punished. The tale type, according to scholars Ibrahim Muhawi and Sharif Kanaana, is very popular in the Arab world. French ethnologist Camille Lacoste-Dujardin, in her study about the Kabylian oral repertoire, listed L'oiseau des pays de labour (sic) as a Moroccan variant of type 707.

=== Motifs ===
French ethnologist Camille Lacoste-Dujardin, in regards to a Kabylian variant, noted that the sisters' jealousy originated from their perceived infertility, and that their promises of grand feats of domestic chores were a matter of "capital importance" to them.

Hasan El-Shamy remarked that in Middle Eastern tales the royal children, born of the third sister, are a brother-sister twin pair.

Philologist Johannes Østrup ascribed an "Oriental" origin to the motif of the monarch banning lighting candles at night, which appears in many of the variants.

Another motif that appears in these variants is the hero suckling an ogress's breastmilk during the quest for the objects.

== Variants ==
=== The Talking Bird ===
In a Moroccan Arabic tale titled ṭ-ṭăyʁ l-mḥăddəθ ("The Talking Bird"), collected in Chefchaouen, Morocco, by researcher Aicha Ramouni from teller Lālla Ḥusniyya l-ʕAlami, the third sister promises to give birth to twins, a boy and a girl who can make the sun appear with their smiles and rain fall with their tears, and leave one brick of gold and other of silver whenever they walk. Their adoptive father is the one to give them the first items the old woman asks for; but the last item, the talking bird, is sought by the brother, who fails, and obtained by the sister. At the end of the tale, the twins' adoptive father becomes rich with the bricks of metal his children left, and invites the twins' biological father for a meal, where the biological father is told of the whole truth, and takes his children back with him.

=== The (Story)telling Bird ===
In a variant from Morocco titled L'Oiseau Conteur, a local king is married to two co-wives, but has not fathered a son yet. A tribe gives him a young woman to marry and she becomes pregnant. Every time a child is born to her (two boys and a girl, in three consecutive pregnancies), the co-wives replace them for puppies and cast them in the river. Each time the children are rescued by a fisherman, who raises them. Seeing that the boys and the girl are becoming fine and brave warriors, the king's jealous vizir advises the king to send the fisherman's children to seek the Oiseau Conteur ("The [Story]telling Bird"). The two elder brothers fail in getting the bird, and are dragged below the earth; the sister traps the bird inside a cage and forces the bird to restore her brothers. The bird is then brought to the king's presence and tells them the fisherman's children are truly his children.

=== The Story of the Singing Bird ===
In an Eastern Moroccan story from Figuig translated as The story of the Singing Bird, three women talk to a man: the first promises to give birth to Gold-horn and Silver-horn, the second that she wants to feed the king, and the third that she wants to marry the king. The king marries the one that wanted to feed him, gives her salt and flour, and makes an inedible dish. The king then takes the woman that promises to bear her children, and nine months later twins are born: a boy with a golden horn and a girl with a silver horn. The king's co-queen becomes jealous and hires a woman to replace the twins for puppies and cast them in the water. The twins are found by a fisherman and his wife, who have magical powers, and raised by them. As for their mother, the king banishes her to pasture the dogs. Back to the children, years later, an old woman appears in the twins' house and tells her about the Singing Bird that makes people mad. After the old lady leaves, the female twin asks her brother to fetch her the Singing Bird. The male twin goes on a journey and meets ogresses that advise him not to interact with the bird, who has divinatory knowledge and can turn him to stone, just as it has done to countless people before. The male twin fails and is turned to stone, and the female twin goes to rescue him. The girl obeys the ogresses' advice and captures the bird in a sack, then forces the animal to restore her brother and everyone. The twins bring the bird to their house and place it in a cage. One day, the king, the twins' father, meets the female twin and wishes to marry her. The Singing Bird, after some singing, flies on the king's head and urinates on him, mocking the monarch for marrying his own daughter. The king demands an explanation, and the Singing Bird tells the whole story. The king then restores his wife, embraces his children, and punishes the evil women.

=== The King's Children ===
In a Jewish-Moroccan tale collected in Skoura, in the Dadès River valley, with the title Les enfants du roi ("The King's Children"), a king has three wives, but no son. A magician advises the monarch to go to a fountain and marry the first woman that appears, for she will give him heirs. It happens thus, and the king takes the woman at the spring as his fourth wife. She becomes pregnant with twins, a boy and a girl, who are replaced by a dog and cat by the midwife the other co-wives bribed. The twins are abandoned in a cave. A shepherd grazes his she-goat, when the animal finds the twins and suckles them. The shepherd raises the twins. When they are of age and ready to marry, the midwife learns of their survival and convinces them to ask their adopted father to provide wedding gifts for them: first, a large garden with all the trees of the world. Their shepherd father sells his flocks and builds the garden. The midwife appears again and mentions the garden should have a castle made of golden and silver bricks. The shepherd does as asked. Finally, the midwife convinces the brother to seek for a nightingale that talks to decorate their garden. The male twin goes on a long journey, meets a man-eating fairy and suckles of her breasts to gain her help. The male twin explains he is looking for the nightingale, but the fairy, who has visited a hundred souks, knows nothing of it, and directs him to her sister, who has travelled to two hundred souks. The male twin passes by the fairy who walked three hundred souks, and lastly to the one who walked four hundred souks. The last fairy shows the male twin a field with the heads of those that failed to get the bird, and advises him how to get the bird by avoiding the guardian of the garden. The male twin takes the nightingale and goes back home. Some time later, the king learns of the shepherd and his children who live in the castle and goes to pay them a visit, taking his fourth wife with him. The nightingale sings day and night in the garden, but begins to talk as soon as the king's fourth wife sees it. The bird reveals the truth of the twins to the king and his wife and they reunite. The king marries his son to a girl of the royal family and his daughter to a cousin, then punishes the three co-wives and midwife to be pulled by horses in a wasteland.

=== The Singing Bird ===
In a Moroccan tale collected from a teller named Khadija Semlali, from Maknassa, and translated to French with the title L'oiseau chanteur ("The Singing Bird"), a sultan has a hundred wives, and only his hundredth wife becomes pregnant, to the jealousy of the other co-wives. Thus, they hire a midwife to replace the newborn for a female puppy if they are female and for a puppy if male. The midwife consults with her seven sons what she should do, and she decides to go along with the co-wives' plan, since she will be handsomely rewarded. The hundredth queen gives birth to a baby girl named Louange à Celui que la Créa el la façonna!, whom the midwife takes to herself and replaces for a puppy. The sultan falls for the ruse and banishes the queen to serve in the kitchen. The midwife raises the girl along with her sons. After the woman dies and the girl becomes a beautiful young woman, an old woman spots the girl on the balcony, admire her beauty and says her beauty deserves a palace of marble and mosaic. The young woman asks her adopted brothers to build one for her. Next, the same old woman sees the newly built palace and says she needs the similing pomegranate and the rose that makes "you-you" [a type of female cry]. The brothers find her the flowers. Lastly, the old woman says she needs the singing bird "with wings that answers to it". The brothers warn her that the quest is dangerous, but agree to indulge their adopted sister. The eldest brother places a branch of rosemary to mark his token of life and goes to find the bird, which is located in a deep forest where ogres disguise themselves as nuts in the trees. The eldest brother ventures into the forest, the bird flies over him and uses its wings to turn him to stone. The remaining brothers fall to the same fate, save for the youngest brother. The cadet makes the same path, when a bird appears and advises him to approach the bird and not interact with it nor with the ogres' voices echoing from the trees, and to pluck a feather to brush on the stones to revive the bird's victims. It happens thus, and the cadete captures the bird inside a golden cage, then revives his elder brothers, and the siblings return home. Some time later, the sultan, Louange's father, rides near the marble palace and notices the marvels (the pomegranate, the rose and the bird) and asks their owners about it. The seven siblings explain they live with their young sister, whom the sultan falls in love with and wishes to marry, unaware she is his daughter. The girl asks the sultan to build a large qandil for her, which is delivered to Louange and where she hides in. The sultan cannot find his bride-to-be in the room for wedding preparations, only the qandil, and sells it to the vizier's son. The vizier's servants bring food to his son, which Louange eats then hides back in the qandil. The vizier's son discovers Louange, learns about her story, and decides to marry her.

=== The King Without An Heir ===
In a Moroccan tale translated to French with the title Le roi sans héritier ("The King Without An Heir"), a king has wealth, possessions, eight wives and eight mares, but no children. He consults with a Christian sorcerer, a Roumi, who advises him to take a ninth wife and buy a ninth mare. The following year, his ninth mare foals a colt, and he marries another woman, who becomes pregnant, to the despair of the other eight co-wives, who bribe a slave to get rid of the unborn children. When the ninth wife is ready, she gives birth to beautiful twins, a boy and a girl, whom the slave replaces for puppies. The king falls for the ruse and banishes his wife to live with the dogs. As for the children, the slave abandons them in the forest, but a good éfrit finds them, protects them from animals and nurses them with she-goat's milk. The éfrit takes the twins and raises them in his palace. When they are sixteen years old, they read a book in their adoptive father's library and discover they are humans and their adoptive father is from another species. They ask the éfrit about their origins, and he tells them about their father, then promises to help the twins find him. Thus, he flies off with them to the king's gardener. The éfrit builds a palace near the king's own and furnishes the twins with princely clothes, the best horses and all sorts of luxuries. One morning, the éfrit convinces the boy to parade about on a horse next to the king. This draws the king's attention, whom the boy invites to his grand palace for a sumptuous feast. After the feast, the king regales his hosts, the twins, with stories, and eventually tells them of the incident of the ninth queen. The king invites the twins for a meal at his palace. A few days later, the twins walk towards the king's palace and see a woman eating the dogs' grub, and they surmise she is their mother. Suddenly, a beautiful honey-coloured steed whinnies as if recognizing its master, the male twin. The twins eat at the king's table and mention the king's missing wife. The monarch summons the governess, who talks about the midwife (the slave). With the éfrit's help, the female twin feigns a pregnancy and calls for the midwife, then locks her up in a dark room. The king is summoned to see the midwife, and the slave confesses her crimes. The king embraces his children and rescues their mother from the kennel, while the male twin takes the horse with him to his stables at the éfrit's palace, but the palace has vanished and only desert remains.

=== Three Women ===
In a Moroccan tale collected by Jilali El Koudia with the title Three Women, three female friends go to collect grass in a field that belongs to a bachelor, and they comment about their marriage wishes with him: the first boasts she can bake bread with a single grain; the second that she can make bean soup with a single bean, and the third promises she will bear him a son with a golden birthmark on the forehead. The bachelor eavesdrops on their conversation and marries all three. After the wedding, the first two fail in delivering their boasts, but the third woman gives birth to her promised child. Due to their great jealousy, the first co-wives cut off the boy's finger and smear the mother's mouth with blood, then send off the child to an old woman to be buried alive. Their husband goes home and, falling for the co-wives' deception, punishes her. Back to the child, he is raised by the old woman, and, when he grows up, he is mocked for being a foundling, so he forces the truth out of his adoptive mother. Later, he decides to search for his mother, accompanied by a wolf, a sheep and a greyhound. Everyone that sees the retinue comment on their togetherness, to which he replies that a mother ate her son. After some time, he is successful in his search and meets his mother, who was banished by her husband to sleep in the kitchen and herd the camels. At the end of the tale, the boy is invited to a meal by his father, and insists the third wife dines with them. The boy's mother joins them, then he asks for the candles to put out and shows his father his golden birthmark, acquitting his mother.

=== The Three Girls ===
In a Moroccan-Berber tale from Rif with the title Ḏanfusṯ n ḏřaṯa n ḏeḇřiɣin, translated to French as Les trois jeunes filles ("The Three Girls"), three girls are friends and do everything together, like gathering herbs and drawing water. One day, they decide to pluck some herbs near the estate of a wealthy man and begin to converse about marriage plans to the man: one of them says out loud she can prepare couscous with a single grain of wheat; the other that she can prepare a dish of damriqt (a dish made of beans) with a single grain, while the third promises to bear a boy with a golden ponytail. The man overhears their conversation and marries all three, then orders the first two to fulfill their boasts. The first two admit they are unable to do so. The third woman becomes pregnant and, as her delivery nears, the other two, her former friends, turn into bitter enemies and plan her downfall: as soon as the boy is born, they cut off a finger and place it near his mother's mouth, while they heat up the oven to burn the boy. A beggar woman intrudes in their plan and asks to spare the boy and give the baby to her. The two women agree and order her never to appear again. As for the boy's mother, her former friends accuse her of devouring her boy, and the husband banishes her to herd the camels, eat with the dogs, lie on the cobblestone, and be beaten with sticks. Back to the boy, the beggar woman raises the boy as her son, but the locals mock him for being a stranger. The boy keeps hearing it and confronts his mother about it. The beggar woman admits the truth to him. The boy decides to search for his birth mother, and the beggar woman gives her blessing. The boy rides his horse through villages in search of the woman that devoured her son, and accompanied by a wolf, a hare and a goat. He eventually arrives at his parents' village and meets his mother, the woman accused of devouring her son. He wishes to be a guest as her house, but she is poor and directs him to her husband's larger home. The boy knocks on the door to his father's house and is invited as an honored guest, and the man asks his co-wives to prepare a fine meal. The boy refuses to eat until the woman that lives with the animals is brought to the table. The woman reluctantly joins the others, but returns to her lowly position. Later that night, the boy goes to meet the woman in secret and washes her with ablution water, puts her in fine robes, and brings her to her husband's house. The boy confronts the man about the woman's accusation, then questions if he can recognize his own son. The boy asks for the door and curtains to be closed, and he shows the shining lock of golden hair, proving his mother's innocence and his father's folly. The boy asks his mother about what to do with her rivals, and she wishes to impart on them the same degrading fate she suffered.

=== The Three Friends ===
In a tale collected from a source in Alhucemas, Rif, with the title Las tres amigas ("The Three Friends"), three girls are friends and one day wake up early to gather firewood near an orchard filled with cereals and trees. They each wish to marry the owner of the orchard, and announce their skills: the first boasts she can prepare him couscous with a single grain of semola, the second that she can weave a chilaba with a single yarn of wool, and the third promises she will bear him a son with a golden toe. The man who owns the orchard overhears their words and marries all three, then requests each of them to fulfill their boasts: the first two admit they are unable to do so. The third woman becomes pregnant and gives birth to the son with a golden toe. The other two cut off a finger from the boy and smear their rival's mouth with the boy's blood, and throw the baby to a she-dog. The boy's mother wakes up and is accused of devouring her baby, but she denies it. Her husband falls for the deception and banishes her to live and eat among the animals and take care of them. As for the boy, the she-dog takes the boy to a beach, where he is found by a fisherman, who brings him to his house. The boy is raised as his son and goes to qoranic school, but the local boys mock him for being a foundling. The fisherman confirms the story, and the boy leaves his adoptive father's home. The boy takes a horse and goes to look for the village where the woman that devoured her son lives. He meets with the woman, who is his mother, then goes to meet his father by pretending to be a pilgrim in need of making ablutions. The boy is welcomed and invited to dine with the man and his co-wives, but the boy insists to invite the woman who lives with the animals. The boy takes the water from his ablutions and gives to the woman, for her to wash herself. The man's co-wives suspect something about their guest, and question the attention he pays to their banished rival. The boy retorts about the story of the woman devouring her son, and shows his father his golden toe. The boy's woman is relieved her son is alive and goes to embrace him, then wishes the other two women suffer the same fate that befell her: living and eating with the animals. According to the collector, the tale was collected in 2002.

=== Other tales ===
Reginetta Haboucha summarized two variants collected from Tétouan by folklorist Arcadio de Larrea Palacín. In the first, Las hermanas envidiosas ("The Jealous Sisters"), the children (two brothers and one sister, in consecutive births) are sent for the Silver Water, the Talking Bird and the Singing Tree. In the second, El agua verde, la caña que tañe y el pájaro que canta, the children (two sons and a daughter), each with a gold star on the front, are born in consecutive years, and when older, are sent for the "Green Water Fish", a Cane or Reed, and the Bird that Sings.

== See also ==
- The Golden Bird (Berber folktale)
- Little Nightingale the Crier
- The Story of Arab-Zandiq
