= Laura Martínez =

Laura Martínez may refer to:

- Laura Martínez (television presenter) (born 1964), Uruguayan television presenter, actress and dancer
- Laura Martínez Ruiz (born 1984), Spanish artistic gymnast
- Laura Martínez (judoka), Spanish judoka
- Laura Martínez de Carvajal, the first female doctor in Cuba
