= Little Nightingale the Crier =

Palestinian Arab folktale

Little Nightingale the Crier (Palestinian Arabic: Blebl is-sayyah) is a Palestinian Arab folktale collected by scholars Ibrahim Muhawi and Sharif Kanaana. It is related to the theme of the calumniated wife and classified in the international Aarne-Thompson-Uther Index as type ATU 707, "The Three Golden Children".

These tales refer to stories where a girl promises a king she will bear a child or children with wonderful attributes, but her jealous relatives or the king's wives plot against the babies and their mother. Variants are collected from oral tradition across Middle Eastern and Arabic-speaking countries.

== Origins ==
According to researchers Yoel Shalom Perez and Judith Rosenhouse, the tale was collected by Muwahi and Kanaana in 'Arraba, in Galilee.

== Summary ==
Three sisters earn their living by spinning and selling their products. One day, however, the king decides to see if his subjects are loyal to him, and decrees that lighting a candle at night is forbidden. The three sisters despair at the fact, since they spin day and night, but decide to obey the prohibition. The elder sister then hopes for the king to pass by their house and to have him wed her to his baker so she can have bread; the middle one makes the same vow, and hopes to marry the king's cook to have food, and the third and youngest sister makes a vow to marry the king's son and promises to give birth to three children, 'Aladdin, Bahaddin and Šamsizzha, who, if she smiles, the sun will shine when it is raining, and if she cries, it will rain when it is sunny.

The king just happens to pass by the sisters' house and orders his vizier to mark their house with a symbol, so they can return later to bring the sisters. It happens so and the three women are brought to his presence, where they reiterate their wishes. The king fulfills their requests and marries the two elder sisters, respectively, to the baker and the cook, while the youngest sister marries the king's son. Driven by jealousy of their cadette's fortune, they bribe the midwife to replace the first child for a puppy, while they cast the baby in a box into the river. The box with the baby washes ashore on a distant orchard and is found by an old couple.

A similar fate befalls the princess's second and third child, who are replaced, respectively, by a kitten and a stone, cast in the sea in a box and saved by the same old couple. Deceived by his sisters-in-law, the king's son deserts his wife. Meanwhile, the three children are raised by the old couple, until their deaths. Now alone in the world, the three siblings move out to his father's city and buy a plot of land just across from the palace and build there a palace.

The siblings' aunts realize the three siblings are their nephews, and hire an old crone to pay them a visit. The old crone peddles her wares in front of their palace and Šamsizzha invites her in. The old crone compliments her beautiful palace, but it is missing the bird called Little Nightingale the Crier. The old crone goes away and Šamsizzha cries; her brothers notice that the weather has changed and race to see their sister. She explains that she wants the Little Nightingale the Crier, and her elder brother offers to get it, giving Bahaddin a ring as token of life and warning him to seek him if the ring tightens around his finger.

'Aladdin rides on until he meets a ghoul, who directs him to his brother. The second ghoul directs him to his sister, a ghouleh (female ghoul) who is grinding salt, and advises him to taste the salt and to suckle her breasts. 'Aladdin follows the ghoul's instructions and manages to have the ghouleh take her in as a son. 'Aladdin tells her about his quest for Little Nightingale the Crier, and the ghouleh says her sons can help him.

The ghouleh's lame son offers to take him, and advises the human to approach the bird, which will begin to talk, but 'Aladdin must not reply. 'Aladdin is brought to the bird's orchard, which perches on a tree and begins to talk. The youth remains quiet and does not answer the bird a first time, but replies after the bird talks again. The animal blows on 'Aladdin and he becomes a stone.

Bahaddin senses something wrong with his elder brothers and follows the same trail as him, passing by the three ghouls and reaching the bird's orchard. Once again, Bahaddin talks to the bird and it turns the boy into stone.

Finally, Šamsizzha sees that Bahaddin's ring has tightened around her finger, disguises herself in male clothes and goes to the road of the ghouls. With the ghouleh's advice, she arrives at the bird's orchard. The bird begins to talk to her, but Šamsizzha keeps quiet. After three times, the bird returns to its cage, and Šamsizzha captures it inside it. The bird begs to be released, but the girl orders the animal to revert the spell on her brothers. The bird tells her to pick up some dirt and to press it on the stones.

Šamsizzha obeys the bird and smears the dirt on the stones, restoring her brothers to life, as well as many others. Šamsizzha and her brothers return home and hang the bird's cage in their palace. Now back to their routine, the 'Aladdin and Bahaddin go back to frequenting the city's coffee houses. One day, they meet their father and invite him for dinner at their palace.

Little Nightingale the Crier advises the siblings to serve a dish of carrots with the fruits. The king eats with the siblings, who bid the bird to come eat with them. The bird declines, and mocks the king for believing that a woman can give birth to a puppy, a kitten and a stone. The king is taken aback by the bird's reply, and asks it to speak again. The bird repeats the same words, and reveals that 'Aladdin, Bahaddin and Šamsizzha are his children.

The king brings in the midwife, who is forced to reveal the whole truth, and he punishes her and the envious sister by burning them in a pyre and scattering their ashes.

== Analysis ==
=== Tale type ===
The tale is classified in the international Aarne-Thompson-Uther Index as type ATU 707, "The Three Golden Children". In this cycle of stories, a woman promises to bear children of wondrous aspect, who are taken from her as soon as they are born by her jealous relatives (her sisters or her mother-in-law). The children survive and are adopted by a childless couple. Years later, the children are sent on a quest for marvellous items, which will eventually lead to reuniting the family.

== Variants ==
The tale type appears in fairy tale collections of Middle Eastern and Arab folklore, and across the Muslim world. Scholar Hasan El-Shamy lists 72 variants of the tale type across Middle Eastern and North African sources. He also stated that variants were collected "in the Eastern part of the Arab culture area", namely, in Palestine, Syria, Lebanon and Iraq.

=== Palestine ===
In a Palestinian tale from Birzeit, collected by Orientalist Paul E. Kahle with the title Die ausgesetzten Zwillingskinder ("The abandoned twin children"), the third and youngest sister promises to give birth to twins, a boy and a girl with silver and golden hair, but the girl shall have three teeth: one to quench the thirsty, the second to satiate the hungry and the third to feed the tired. The twins are still set on a quest for a bird that flaps its wings and sings.

In a tale titled Dancing Jasmine, Singing Water, published by author Sonia Nimr, three poor sisters earn their living by making candles. One day, the king and his vizier just happen to pass by their house, when they overhear their conversation: the elder sister claims she can bake a cake to feed the whole army; the middle sister that she can make a candle large enough to illuminate the whole palace, and the youngest promises to bear him twins, a boy brave and strong enough to defeat a whole army and a girl with hair of gold and hair of silver. The kinh brings the girls to the palace and marries the elder, who dismisses her boast, and divorces her. He then marries the middle sister, who also dismisses hers. Lastly, he divorces the middle sister and marries the youngest, who gets pregnant and gives birth to her wondrous twins, both "more beautiful than the sun and the moon". The jealous sisters bribe the midwife to replace the twins for puppies and throw the twins in a basket in the water. A fisherman finds the twins and rescues them; his wife names them Shams (the boy) and Qamar (the girl). They grow up together, and the tale explains that whenever the girl is sad, it begins to rain, and whenever she is happy, the sun shines. After their adoptive parents die, the twins move out to the king's city and build a house for themselves. One day, the jealous aunts learn of their survival and pay them a visit. They tell Qamar her garden is beautiful, but lacks the Dancing Jasmine Tree that spreads scents. Next, they convince her to send her brother for the Singing Water that produces melodies with its flowing, and finally for the Wise Bird. Shams goes in search of the objects and is helped by a jinn and her family. After Shams brings the Wise Bird back, it begins to repeat a verse about the king having children. The king passes by the twins' house and notices the beautiful objects in their garden, when the bird repeats its verses. After listening to the bird's words, he notices the twins are his children, and goes to punish his sisters-in-law. Author and translator Praline Gay-Para published a similar Palestinian tale, translated to French as Le jasmin qui dance, l'eau qui chante, et l'oiseaux avisé ("The Jasmine that Dances, The Water that Sings, and the Clever Bird"), collected in 2008 from a source in Bethlehem.

Professor Ulrich Seeger collected and published a Palestinian tale from an informant in Ramallah, with the title Die Königin brachte einen Stein zur Welt ("The Queen Gave Birth to a Stone"). In this tale, a king is childless despite having a wife, so he remarries. The second wife gives birth to three children in consecutive pregnancies, but the first wife bribes a midwife to replace the children with a stone, a cat and a dog and get rid of them. The midwife throws the babies in a garden, but they are rescued by the person who owns the garden. The man builds the siblings a castle, and the king's first wife learns of their survival, so she sends the midwife to get rid of them again. The midwife tells the female sibling about an element that is missing in their garden. One of the brothers goes in search of what is missing and finds a demon whose hairs and nails he clips. The demon reveals that the siblings need the branches of a certain tree. The brothers do the same on the second day. On the third day, the midwife tells the sister about the nightingale that sings nonstop. The male demon sends the brothers to his demon brother and demon sister, whose breast they suckle. The female demon points to the location of the bird, but they hear its voice and turn to stone. Their sister realizes her elder siblings are in danger and goes after them, captures the bird and revives her brothers. The tree branches and the bird decorate the garden, so the king takes the vizier to pay them a visit. During the visit, the nightingale reveals the truth to the king, saying that a woman does not give birth to a stone, nor to animals. The king discovers the truth, reunites with his children and executes the first wife and the midwife by burning.

=== Israel ===
According to an early analysis by Israeli folklorist Dov Noy, the Israel Folktale Archive (IFA) contained at first two variants of the tale type, one from a Yemeni source, and another from a Turkish source. A later study by scholar Heda Jason listed 7 variants in the Jewish Oriental tale corpus.

Author Peninnah Schram published an Israeli tale titled Children of the King: three sisters live together who are skilled weavers, but the youngest has the best craftsmanship. One night, they rest and talk about their king who is ready to choose a wife, and boast about their skills: the eldest claims she can weave a tapestry to cover the walls of the palace, the middle one that she can sew a tent to cover the entire army, and the youngest that she will bear three children, two boys and a girl, unlike the world has ever seen. The king, who was passing by, overhears their conversation and sends for them the next morning. After inquiring the three sisters, the two elders dismiss their boasts, while the youngest declares she can fulfill hers, since she saw it in a dream. The king marries the third sister, to the jealousy of the elder two, who conspire with the midwife to take the babies, replace them for cats and abandon them in the woods. It happens so: the queen is expelled by the king, while the children are found by a poor old woman. Years later, the aunts pass by the old woman's house and, realizing their nephews and niece are alive, she convinces the sister to send her brothers on a quest for a pool and a nightingale that sings songs. The elder brother fails and is trapped along other prisoners, but his younger brother takes the bird and saves his elder. Later, the king passes by the siblings' house and notices the sister's beauty, when the nightingale begins to sing about it. The king wonders about its behaviour, and it sings again about the three children. The old woman who raised them appears with the cloths they were wrapped in when she found them, which the monarch recognizes as his wife's handiwork. Realizing the ruse, he punishes his sisters-in-law, reinstates the queen and rewards the old woman. In her notes, Schram classified the tale as type 879*G, despite recognizing its connection to type 707, and reported the existence of at least 22 variants in the IFA archive.

=== Bedouins ===
In a tale from the Bedouins in Israel, collected from a source from the ʽArab el-Zbēdāt tribe with the title The Three Siblings and the Talking Birds, a king has three wives, then marries a fourth one. The fourth co-wife gives birth to a son, which is replaced by a cat and given to the gardener. The same thing happens to the fourth wife's next children, another boy (replaced by a dog) and a girl (replaced by a stone). The king, seeing that his wife did not give birth to human children, demotes her to a menial position in the kitchen. Meanwhile, the children are given to the gardener to raise, who names them ʽIzz-ad-dīn ('Religion Pride'), Yiḥya-d-dīn ('Let-Live-The-Religion') and Ḏaww el-Qamar ('Moonlight'). One day, when they are older, the midwife pays them a visit and convinces the sister to ask her brother to find her the "half-world mirror" that can see into half of the world. The brothers find a sorceress's daughter, which they fetch a comb for to trade for the mirror. Next, the midwife sends them for a tree with two birds on it that tell everything. The brothers meet the sorceress's daughter again, who directs them to a ghoul. The ghoul agrees to a trade: the birds on the tree for Princess Faṭma. The brothers ride to the sea, where Princess Faṭma lives, and tell her the reason for their quest. In order to protect Princess Faṭma and trick the ghoul, they fashion a wooden effigy and deliver it to the ghoul, gaining the tree with the birds on it. Lastly, the siblings invite the king for a feast. During the meal, the two birds begin to talk to each other about the sad history of the queen and her three children, ʽIzz-ad-dīn, Yiḥya-d-dīn and Ḏaww el-Qamar. The king overhears their conversation and asks them to repeat. The bird, one named Abu Ṣayyah ('Yeller'), repeat their talk, one of them saying it weeps for the queen's children. The king learns of the truth, punishes his three co-wives and restores the fourth wife as his queen.

In another Bedouin tale, collected from a source from the ʽArab el-Mazārīb tribe with the title The Wicked Old Woman, a man takes another woman for his wife, instead of one of his seven female cousins, for the woman will bear him a boy, Gumar ('moon'), and a girl, Shams ('Sun'). When the woman bears him the twins, "beautiful like the sun and moon", the seven female cousins bribe a midwife to take the children and cast them in a box in the sea, placing two dogs next to their mother. It happens thus, but the twins are rescued by a fisherman, who brings the twins to a king to be raised. However, the "Old Woman of Evil" sees the children and abandons them in the forest to be eaten by hyenas. The children cry, their weeping producing rain, and play, and the weather clears for them. A giant black bird feeds the children. Some time later, the girl utters that the Lord shall give them a house, and it happens so. Later, the same Old Woman of Evil pays them a visit and tells Shams to ask her brother to bring her the "buzzing and bells thing" (the collectors mention that it is a tree). Gumar journeys to a long-bearded hut ('water ogre'), whom he helps and is directed to a ghoul family. Gumar suckles on the ghoul matriach's breasts to be accepted into their family, and the ghouls direct him to the tree. Gumar brings the tree back and it produces sounds like "bells and songs". The Old Woman of Evil returns and is killed by the hut, and the tale ends.

=== Middle East ===
According to scholars Ulrich Marzolph and Richard van Leewen, apart from the tale The Sisters Envious of Their Cadette, the compilation The Arabian Nights contains a second variant titled Abú Niyyan and Abú Niyyatayn, part of the frame story The Tale of the Sultan of Yemen and his three sons (The Tale of the King of al-Yaman and his three sons). The tale is divided into two parts: the tale of the father's generation falls under tale type ATU 613, "Truth and Falsehood"; the sons' generation follows type ATU 707. In the second part, Abu Niyyan marries a princess and is declared king. His sisters-in-law take their male nephews as soon as they are born and cast them in the water, but they are saved by the gardener. Abu Niyyan's wife gives birth to her third child, a daughter, whom they raise together. When the girl attains marriageable age, she begins to take a keen interest in the gardener's adopted sons, which leads to the truth being exposed. A third version present in The Arabian Nights is The Tale of the Sultan and his sons and the Enchanting Bird, a fragmentary version that focuses on the quest for the bird with petrifying powers.

In an Arab variant, "Царевич и три девушки" ("The Emperor and the Three Girls"), three poor weaving sisters work late at night by candlelight, when the prince comes and spies on them. He overhears the oldest boasting that she would weave a carpet for the entire army to sit, the middle one that she would cook enough food to feed his army, and the youngest that she would bear "a bar of gold and a bar of silver". The prince summons them to his presence, and the youngest explains she meant a son (gold) and a daughter (silver). Her sisters replace them for puppies, and she is banished from the palace. The twins are found by a fisherman. In this version, the prince simply meets the twins while walking through the city, and remarries his own wife, without knowing it at first.

In a Middle Eastern tale titled The Forsaken Queen, three sisters live in a kingdom by the sea and earn their living by selling the woolen articles they sew and weave at night. However, the local king forbids lighting lamps at night to protect the kingdom from pirates' night raids. One night, the king and his prime minister disguise themselves and mingle with the people, finding the only illuminated house in the city: the three sisters'. They spy on their conversation: the elder sisters wish to marry the king's baker and cook, respectively, to have access to good food, while the youngest says she "dreams" of marrying the king and promises to bear him twins, a boy with half of his hair of gold and the other of silver, and a girl whose laugh can make the sun shine and whose sadness makes the rain come. The next morning, the king sends for the three sisters and scolds them for disobeying the royal decree, but fulfills their marriage wishes, the youngest sister, named Razan, marrying the king. However, the monarch gives her an ultimatum: either she gives birth to her promised twins, and live in luxury and comfort, or, failing that, she will be banished to a secluded house. Fortunately, Razan does give birth to her twins, to the chagrin of the king's two co-wives, who take the children and cast them in the river in a basket, and place little animals in the cradle. The twins are saved by the gardener, and given the names Firas (the boy) and Manal (the girl). They later decide to see the world, and sail on a raft that is found by a seaman (who is in reality a disguised king of fairies), who takes the twins as their own and raises them. Years later, the king of fairies gives the twins a magic ring that can summon a genie to help them, and the twins move out to their father's city, where they create a palace right in front of the king's with the ring's genie. The king's co-wives learn of the twins' survival and send an old midwife to get rid of them. She pays Manal a visit and talks to her about three wonderful objects that can enhance the grandiosity of their home: the joyous birds, the lighting gown, and the lady of the Fancy Garden, Lady Maliha herself. With the help and advice of an old man, Firas brings the birds: he takes a branch from the joyous tree, and plants it in his garden; the next day, a tree sprouts with a male and a female bird perched on it. He next quests for the lighting gown, which is given by the lady of the Fancy Garden, and is able to shine brilliantly at night. At the end of the tale, Lady Maliha joins the twins and invites the king for a feast at their palace, where she reveals the whole truth.

=== Lebanon ===
In a Lebanese variant collected by H. Ritter and Otto Spies with the title Die Prinz and seine drei Frauen ("The Prince and his three Wives"), a farmer's three daughters wish to marry the prince, the youngest promising to give birth to a girl with golden hair and a boy with silver hair. The prince marries all three, and the elder sisters replace the children for a cat and a dog. They are saved by a fisherman and his wife, who sell the children's metal-coated hair in the market. They become rich, their parents die and they move out to a palace in the prince's city. Their aunts send them on a quest for a tree with drums and music and a bride for his brother. The bride, with her omniscient knowledge, narrates the twins' story to the king during a dinner.

In a Middle Eastern tale collected from a Lebanese teller and translated as The Shrieking Nightingale, four poor sisters, Watfa, Alya, Nasma and Najma, work by spinning wool and selling it. One day, they buy some bread and stop to rest and eat in an abandoned hut. They see the king's son on a hut - who is actually overhearing the sisters - and declare their wishes: the elder two wish to work in the kitchen peeling garlic and onions, so they can eat better food there; the third sister wants to knead the dough, but the youngest states she'd rather poor with pride then accept marrying the king's son. The king's son, Maher, just happens to enter the room to inquire the youngest sister about her decision; she answers that she might feel humiliated by being the wife of the prince. He does choose Najma as his wife, and takes the other sisters to work and live in the palace. However, the elder sisters begin to hate their cadette's fortune, and conspire to harm her: they bribe the midwife to replace Najma's children, a boy and a girl, for a dog and a stone. The elder two sisters lock the twins in a box, but Nasma, the third sister, places a bag of money in their box out of pity. They cast the box in the sea, but the box is rescued by a poor fisherman called Meri, who releases the twins from the box and raises them with his wife Saada. They move out to another village and name the boy Clever Hasan and the girl Sitt al-Ihsan, who become skilled youngsters. Meanwhile, their mother, queen Najma, is trapped in a tower, away from her husband, while the king sets an equestrian competition. Clever Hasan excels at the games and draws the attention of the king Maher. The aunts realize that Clever Hasan is their nephew, and Watfa and Alya hatch a plan to kill him: they send the midwife to the king's mother's palace and says that it lacks the shrieking nightingale with feathers of many colours and able to sing in seven languages which lies in the city of the jinn and only Clever Hasan can bring it to him. With the guidance of three she-ghouls, Clever Hasan brings the bird to him, but the nightingale does not sing and appears to be despondent. Until one day, when the evil midwife pays a visit to the king, the nightingale shrieks about the disgraced queen and her children. On hearing this, king Maher unravels the truth and releases his wife from prison, leaving the fate of her persecutors to her. Queen Najma forgives her sister Nasma, banishes the elder two to their old village, and orders the execution of the midwife. The king also rewards the fisherman and his wife and takes them to live in the palace with Clever Hasan and Sitt al-Ihsan.

In a Lebanese tale translated by author Inea Bushnaq as The Nightingale that Speaks, to test his subjects' loyalty, a king orders that no one shall keep any light at night. One night, he goes with his vizier to visit a poor house where three sisters live and spin wool. He overhears their conversation: the eldest sister wishes to marry the king's baker, the middle one the king's cook, and the youngest wants to marry any man, even the king's son, who can carry clothes for her to the hammam (bathhouse), and would bear twins, a boy with a lock of silver and a girl with a lock of gold. The king takes them to the palace and marries them to their husbands of choice. Despite living in the palace, the elder sisters begin to nurture envy towards their cadette, and plot against her when the king's son departs for war. When their sister gives birth to her twins, the elder sister replace them for a kitten and a puppy, place the twins in a wicker basket and cast them in the water. The wicker basket is found by a gardener. The man and his wife raise the twins until they die, and the twins live in the gardener's house. One day, one of their aunts recognizes them and sends the old midwife to their house. The midwife tells the twin sister about the Bulbul as-Siah, the Nightingale that Speaks. The twin sister asks her brother to bring it to her. The twin brother, with the help of a ghoul, takes part in a chain of quests: to get the nightingale, he has to find the Rice-Bearing Tree; to get the tree, he has to find the daughter of the king of the Far City. The twin brother takes the objects and the princess with him back to his sister, and he marries the princess. One day, the king, their father, visits their house to see the wondrous items (the bird and the tree), and the bird sings a song about how ridiculous it is that a human woman gave birth to animals.

=== Syria ===
In a Syrian variant from Tur Abdin, collected by Eugen Prym and Albert Socin, Ssa'îd, the king of grasshoppers, has three wives, but no children yet. The third wife, also the youngest, gives birth to a boy and a girl, who are replaced for cats and thrown in the water. They are rescued by a fisherman and his wife, and whenever they are bathed, gold and silver appear in the bathwater. One day, when the brother is insulted for not knowing his true parentage, he leaves his adoptive parents with his sister. They then move to a hut near the king's residence, which they demolish and build a palace. The brother is the one to reveal the whole truth to his father, the king.

In a Syrian tale collected by Uwe Kuhr with the title Die drei Schwestern ("The Three Sisters"), one night, three sisters confess their innermost desires: the eldest wants to marry the king's cook to eat the best dishes; the middle one the king's pastry maker to eat the finest sweets; and the youngest the king himself, for she wants to bear him a brave and clever son. The king overhears their talk and summons them the next morning to his palace. The king marries the youngest, to the sisters' jealousy. When their sister gives birth to twins, a boy and a girl, they cast the children in a box in the river and tell the king the babies were stillborn. The box is saved by a childless sheik, who adopts the twins and names them Jamil (the boy) and Jamila (the girl). Years later, when the sheik dies, their jealous aunts send them for the silver water, the golden tree and the truth-telling peacock, located in the Mountain of Wonders.

In an Arab tale collected by Enno Littmann from a Syrian source and translated to German language with the title Die Geschichte von der sprechenden Nachtigall ("The Story of the Speaking Nightingale"), a king orders his people not to light any light source for three days. He then convinces his vizier to disguise themselves in order to spy on which subjects obeyed and disobeyed his order. The pair soon finds a house where three young sisters are spinning and talking: one of them wishes to marry the king's baker to eat bread always; the second one to the king's cook so she could always eat warm dishes, and the third one wants to marry the king himself, for she will bear him a boy in the first year, another boy in the second year, and a girl in the third year of such beauty she will have hair of gold and silver on either side of her head, and when she laughs the sun appears, and it rains when she cries. The king overhears their conversation and sends for the youngest sister, but she declines his order for she and her family are poor and do not have good clothes. A king's emissary gives her nice garments and she goes to the king's presence, where she repeats her and her sisters' wishes from the night before. Their marriage wishes are fulfilled, and her elder sisters are married to lowly servants. The elder sisters soon bribe a midwife to replace the firstborn son for a hound and get rid of the baby, then a cat for the second son, and a stone for the girl. The midwife does as instructed, but gives the children each time to the childless gardener. The garden raises the children in his palace. Years later, the sisters recognize the children and realize they are alive, then send the midwife to get rid of them. The midwife pays a visit to the girl, called Schams en-Nahâr, in the gardener's house and says her garden is beautiful, but it is lacking the tree with the golden stars (also called "Sternenbaum" 'Tree of Stars' in the German translation). The girl's elder brother, called ‘Alaij ed-Dîn, journeys to fetch the tree, is helped by demons, and brings back the tree to plant in their garden. Later, the aunts sends the midwife again, and the woman convinces Schams en-Nahâr to get the speaking nightingale. ‘Alaij ed-Dîn goes through the same route and enters the garden where he obtained the tree, this time to fetch the bird. However, he tries to get the bird and is turned to stone. The middle brother goes to rescue his brother, captures the bird and forces him to reveal how to restore his brother. The pair returns home with the bird. Some time later, the gardener goes to invite the king for a visit to his palace. During the dinner, the king questions how the gardener can eat golden carrots, but the carrots are for the nightingale. The bird admits it can talk, the dish is for him, just as much as a woman can bear animals and a stone in three consecutive years. The king is shocked by the bird's words, and learns the gardener's children are in fact the royal children his wife promised him. He punishes the midwife and his sisters-in-law, and retakes his wife.

=== Iraq ===
Novelist and ethnologist E. S. Drower collected an Iraqi tale titled The King and the Three Maidens, or the Doll of Patience. This tale focuses on the mother's plight: the youngest sister promises children born with hair of gold on one side and silver on the other, but, as soon as they are born, the children are cast into the water by the envious older sisters. She is told she must never reveal the truth to her husband, the king, so she buys a doll to confide in (akin to The Young Slave and ATU 894, "The Stone of Pity").

In a dialectal variant collected in Baghdad with the title The Nightingale, a sultan's son camps out with his army near the grand vizier's three daughters. Each of the girls announce their wishes to marry the sultan's son by performing grand feats: the oldest by baking a loaf of bread to feed the sultan's son and the army, the middle by weaving a carpet large enough for everyone to seat, and the youngest by bearing twins, a boy with gold locks and a girl with silver locks. The sultan's son marries the elder girl first, but when she states she cannot bake a loaf of bread as she described, she is downgraded to the kitchen. The same happens to the second sister. When the third sister does bear her twins, her sisters replace the children for puppies and throw them in the river. The twins are saved by a fisherman and his wife; whenever they bathe the twins, a bar of gold and a bar of silver appear. Their aunts send them after the clapping apples, the ululating pomegranates, and the singing nightingale.

=== Assyrian people ===
In a tale from the Assyrian people published by Russo-Assyrian author Konstantin P. (Bar-Mattai) Matveev with the title "Царь Шах-Аббас и три девушки" ("Tsar Shah-Abbas and the Three Girls"), Emperor Shah Abbas spies on three sisters talking, the youngest promising to bear male twins with curls of pearl. After their birth, the sisters replace them for puppies and puts them in the water in a box. Both boys are saved by a miller. When they are nine years old, they wreck their adoptive father's mill and decide to leave home. They settle in a house in the wood that belong to their biological father, Shah-Abbas. One of his messengers scolds the boys and orders them to appear at the king's presence. They pass by a woman and do not spit on her. The twins wonder why she is in a sorry state, and a jet of milk from her breasts enters their mouths. The guards send them to the king, who asks about their life story, and summons his disgraced wife, who confirms the twins' narration.

Researcher Valentina Cedernil collected a tale from an Iraqi Assyrian Christian source that lived in Hammarkullen. In her tale, titled The Power of God and of the Blood Tie, a king's son, who is also the commander of the army, rests with his retinue by a saqiyah. By the saqiyah, three sisters are talking to each other, all of them wishing to marry the king's son: the eldest boasts she can cook a small pot of food to feed the entire army, the middle one that she can weave a carpet for the whole army to sit, which can be folded to fit in his pocket, and the youngest promises to bear twins, one with head of gold, the other with head of silver. The king's son overhears their conversation and marries all three. Some time later, the elder two are asked to deliver on their boasts, but they dismiss it as mere talk, and are demoted to be servants at the palace. As for the third sister, she gives birth to her promised children, twin boys, who are replaced for puppies and cast in the water in a box by the first wife. The box washes away to a mill, and the boys are saved by the miller, who raises them with his wife. Every day, the miller and his wife find two pouches with gold and silver near the boys' heads, and become rich. As for the boys' mother, she is demoted to polish the shoes of whoever enters the palace. Back to the boys, they grow up and go to the king's palace to choose wives for themselves. On the way, the boys pass by the woman polishing shoes and kiss her hands. They enter the palace and meet the king and the king's daughters, whom they treat as sisters. At the end of the tale, the eldest wife, on her deathbed, reveals her secret to the king, who reconciles with the third wife and brings her sons to live with them.

=== Saudi Arabia ===
As part of fieldwork in Jizan region, researcher Waleed Ahmed Himli collected in 2008 a tale from 88-year-old teller Nema Amshanaq. In her tale, titled El-Bolbol El-Saiyyah ("The Singing Nightingale" or "The Warbler Nightingale"), a king is going to the hajj, and tells his mother to look after his pregnant wife. The wife gives birth to "beautiful" twins, a boy and a girl, who are taken from her by the queen mother and cast in the water in a box. The twins are saved by a fisherman and his wife, who give the boy a magical ring. Years later, the queen mother visits the twins and convinces the girl to ask her brother for a flowing river beside their palace, fragrant roses and a singing nightingale - which the brother obtains by using the magic ring to wish for them. Lastly, the boy searches for the "China China Girl" as his bride, and goes on a journey to find her. Himli also indicates that the tale type is "widely reported ... [from] various parts of Saudi Arabia".

=== Yemen ===
In a Yemeni tale titled "البلبل الصياح والورد النفاح والنهر السراح" ("The Speaking Nightingale, the Fragrant Rose, and the Flowing River"), translated by researcher Ángela Antonia Piccolo with the title El ruiseñor melodioso, la rosa perfumada y el río sinuoso ("The Melodious Nightingale, the Perfumed Rose and the Winding River"), the king goes on pilgrimage to Mecca and asks his mother to look after his wife. After he leaves, the queen, who is pregnant, gives birth to twins, a boy and a girl, whom their grandmother takes and casts them in the water in a box, then smears some blood on the queen's mouth. Due to the stress and pain of the labour, the queen has fallen asleep, then wakes up, asking for her children. The king's mother lies to her that she devoured her own children, but the queen denies it, saying that she never saw her children. After the king returns, his mother repeats the lie to her son and he decides to lock up his wife. As for the children, a childless fisherman and his wife find the twins and raise them. The fisherman gives his wife a sword and a magic ring to be delivered to the male twin after they come of age, and dies. The fisherman's wife later discovers her adopted children are the king's children and their mother is in prison, and reveals it to them. She also gives the sword and the ring to the male twin, who can use it to fulfill whatever wish his sister may have. The fisherman's wife dies and the twins build a castle in front of the king's with the ring's magic. The king, their father, tells his mother he wishes to pay a visit to the owners of the castle that appeared overnight, but his mother protests, fearing the castle is the work of jinns and ifrits. She then offers to go on his behalf, since the twins are living proof of her wicked deed. The woman pays a visit to her twin grandchildren and mentions to her granddaughter their palace is beautiful, but lacks a winding river next to it, which is provided by her brother's magic ring. She returns twice more and convinces the girl to have a perfumed rose and a melodious nightingale next, which are also provided by the powers of the ring. Lastly, she tells the girl to convince her brother to marry a maiden named Bint al-Sīn al-Sīn (which, the researcher explains in her notes, means a maiden from the other world, difficult to reach). The male twin tries to summon her with the ring, but a voice inside it tells him it is risky. The male twin insists to find her, and the ring's voice tells him he should go to a certain place and suckle an ogress breasts to win her over to his side. It happens thus, and the ogress advises the youth how to proceed: he is to pass by seven increasingly larger doors, reach a spring and throw seven stones on the fountain, invoking the name of Bint al-Sīn al-Sīn; white smoke will appear with a sleeve, which he is to enter and find Bint al-Sīn al-Sīn. The youth does as instructed, meets Bint al-Sīn al-Sīn, marries her and brings her home with him. Some time later, the king notices the castle and its occupants are more beautiful than before, but, convinced by his mother, takes his soldiers and knock on their palace. The twins and Bint al-Sīn al-Sīn welcome the king and his army for a banquet, producing a large feast with the ring, and the king invites them to his palace the following day. The following day, the twins and Bint al-Sīn al-Sīn attend the king's dinner, and are given a poisoned dish made by the king's mother. As soon as the three begin to eat it, a bird suddenly flies in and warns them not to touch it for it was poisoned by the king's mother. The king throws the food to the dogs and cats, which eat it and die, thus proving the truth of the bird's words. The king confronts his mother about it, who admits everything and reveals the truth. He executes his mother and releases his wife from prison.

== See also ==
- The Bird from the Land of Gabour
- The Golden Bird (Berber folktale)
- The Story of Arab-Zandiq
