= Guðmundur Kamban =

Icelandic writer

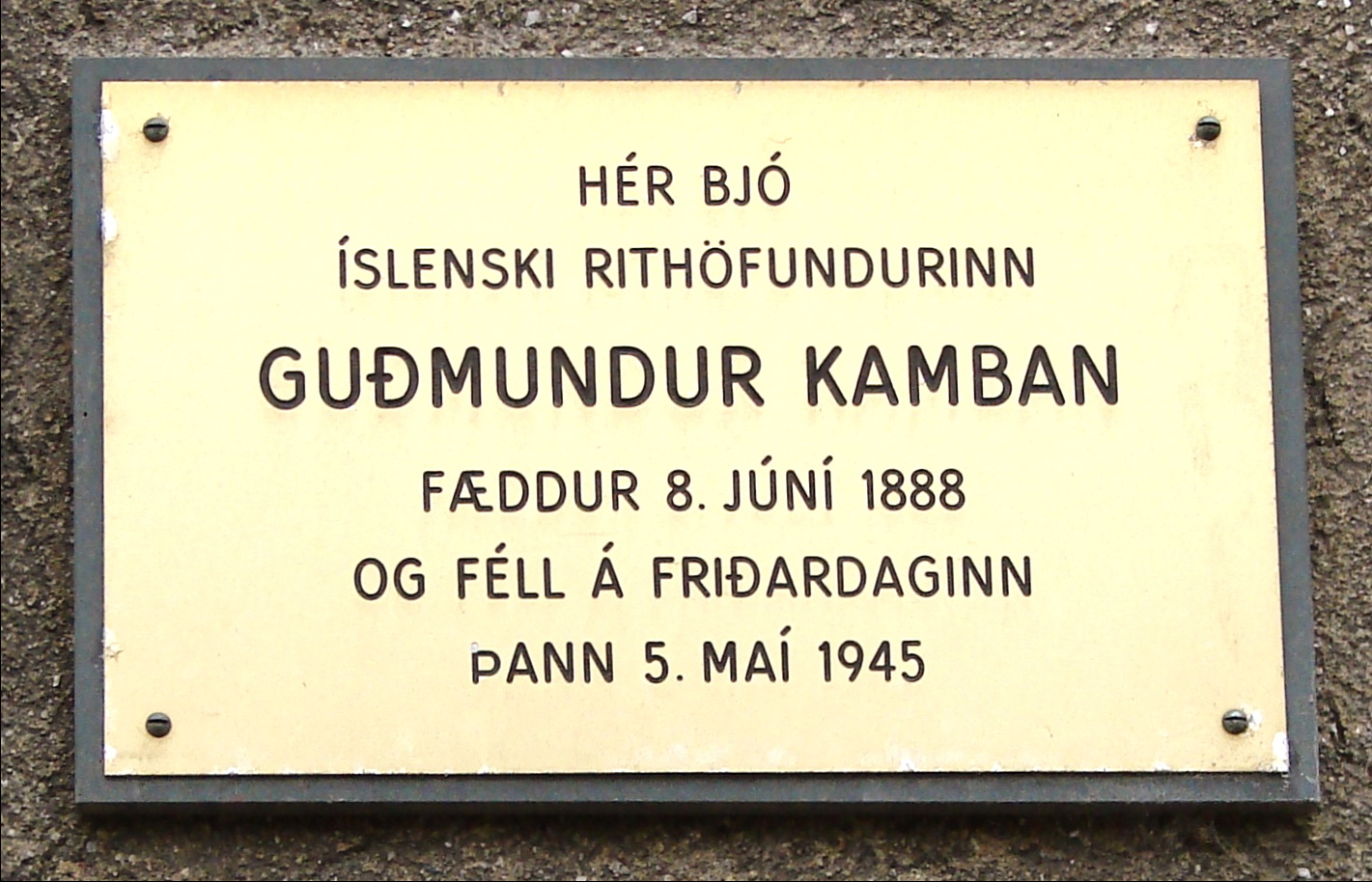
- The commemorative plaque of Guðmundur Kamban
- Born: Guðmundur Jónsson; 8 June 1888; Litlibær, Garðasókn, Iceland
- Died: 5 May 1945 (aged 56); Copenhagen, Denmark
- Cause of death: Murder
- Occupations: Playwright, novelist
- Spouse: Agnete Egeberg
- Children: 1

Guðmundur Kamban (8 June 1888 – 5 May 1945) was an Icelandic playwright and novelist.

== Biography ==
He was born in the farm of Litlibær in Garðasókn, Iceland, son of a merchant of an old and well-known Icelandic family. He graduated from the College of Reykjavík, where he received honoris causa in literature and language. While still at college, he was made assistant editor of the best known newspaper in Iceland, edited by Björn Jónsson. In 1906 his psychic abilities were also investigated by the Experimental Society founded by Einar Hjörleifsson Kvaran: as a clairvoyant, he succeeded in divining the contents of closed books, and as an automatic writer he penned works supposedly by Hans Christian Andersen, Jónas Hallgrímsson, and Snorri Sturluson. But he lost his mediumistic abilities after a serious illness.

In 1908 he adopted the family name Kamban in place of his birth name (Guðmundur Jónsson) and advocated a change in Icelandic naming conventions.

In 1910, he proceeded to the University of Copenhagen, where he specialized in literature and received his master's degree.

In 1914 he published his first play, Hadda Padda which was endorsed by Georg Brandes and shown in the Danish Royal Theatre with Kamban as assistant director. He later married an actress from the play, Agnete Egeberg, and they had a daughter in 1921.

In 1915 Kamban moved to New York, intending to establish himself as an English language writer. He was not successful and moved back to Copenhagen with his wife in 1917. In 1920 he achieved success at Dagmarteatret with We Murderers and was employed as a director at the theatre.

He is also the author of spirited and erudite historical novels based on the Icelandic sagas, including Skalholt (4 vols., 1930–32; tr. of Vol. I and II, The Virgin of Skalholt, 1935) and I See a Wondrous Land (1936, tr. 1938).

Kamban directed plays, wrote novels and produced motion pictures in Copenhagen until 1934, when he moved to London. Not finding success there, he relocated to Berlin in 1935 and lived there until 1938, when he moved back to Copenhagen. On the 100th anniversary of his birth, his play Marmari, or Marble, was produced by the National Theatre of Iceland.

=== Death ===
During the German occupation of Denmark, Kamban received German research funding and came to be seen as a collaborator although a police investigation found no evidence that he betrayed the resistance to the Nazi.

On 5 May 1945, as the German forces in Denmark surrendered, Kamban was murdered at a Copenhagen restaurant in front of his wife and daughter, by Danish partisans. His body was returned to Iceland and he was buried with honors in Reykjavik. Although known by Danish authorities, the name of Kamban's killer was kept secret for decades. In September 2023 Icelandic historian and journalist, Guðmundur Magnússon, revealed the identity of the man that shot Kamban as Egon Alfred Højland, who was a prominent leader of the Danish resistance and later became a member of the Danish parliament.

== Sources ==
- We murderers; a play in three acts
- Íslenskir leikhúsmenn
- Guðmundur Kamban
