= The Golden Bird (Berber folktale) =

Folk tale from Kabylia

The Golden Bird (French: L'oiseau d'or) is a Berber tale from Kabylia, collected by author Mouloud Mammeri. It is related to the theme of the calumniated wife and classified in the international Aarne-Thompson-Uther Index as type ATU 707, "The Three Golden Children". These tales refer to stories where a girl promises a king she will bear a child or children with wonderful attributes, but her jealous relatives or the king's wives plot against the babies and their mother. Variants are collected in Algeria and in Kabylie, among the Berbers.

== Summary ==
In this tale, three sisters express their wishes to marry the king, and boast about their abilities: the elder boasts she can prepare crêpes for the king with a single grain of wheat; the middle one that she can sew a beautiful coat with a single fleece, and the youngest that she will bear twins, a boy and a girl, with golden forehead. The king, who was strolling in the garden at the time, overhears their conversation, and decides to marry all three. Later, he bids his elder wife fulfills her boast and cook him the crêpes, but she fails. The middle one cannot weave the coat either. As for the youngest, she is pregnant, and indeed gives birth to her children: babies with blond hair so shiny it looks like gold. The elder sisters feel threatened by their cadette's success and bribe a midwife to replace the children for puppies and throw them in the water in a box.

It happens thus: the box washes away and is rescued by a fisherman, who brings it home to his wife. They open it and find the twins inside, their hair shining with a blinding light. They decide to raise the children and name them Aziz and Aziza. Despite their poor situation, Aziz and Aziza play games with a king's son and win louis and enough gold for their adoptive parents. They move out to a palace, but, in time, their adoptive parents die of old age, and leave the twins alone. Aziz spends his days hunting while Aziza stays home. One day, a local old woman, envying their good life, pays them a visit and convinces Aziza to send her brother to fetch lioness's milk in a satchel made of the skin of a lioncub, so the girl can use the milk on her skin and be even more beautiful. Aziz agrees to fetch her the milk, and consults with the local wise men how to approach the lioness: take seven sheep and throw them to the lioncubs in their den while their mother is away. Aziz reaches the lioness's den, feeds them the sheep and takes the cub and milk with him. Next, the old sorceress tells Aziza about a wonderful necklace made of pearls that can make her even more beautiful.

Lastly, the old woman tells Aziza to seek the Golden Bird that can sing melodious songs and can predict the future. Aziz goes to fetch the bird and is turned to stone when he interacts with the bird. When Aziz does not return at the appointed time, Aziza goes after him, captures the bird and restore her male twin and other petrified people. The twins bring the Golden Bird in a cage and hang it on his palace. Meanwhile, the king, their father, goes with his retinue to the twins' palace to see for himself Aziza's beauty and the bird's singing, but the animal stops its song. The king orders the bird to sing, and the bird replies that it cannot sing to a king that wants to marry his own daughter and kill his own son. The king is intrigued by the bird's words, and, advised by the bird, brings with him his former third wife (which he imprisoned), the midwife and his elder co-wives to the palace the next day. At the assemblage, the Golden Bird reveals the whole truth to the twins, their mother and the king.

== Analysis ==
=== Tale type ===
The tale is classified in the international Aarne-Thompson-Uther Index as type ATU 707, "The Three Golden Children": three sisters converse among themselves about their plans to marry the king, the youngest promising to bear children with wondrous aspect; the king decides to marry the youngest (or all three), and the youngest bears the wondrous children, who are taken from her and cast in the water by the jealous aunts; years later, the children, after many adventures, reunite the family, which leads to the aunts being punished. The tale type, according to scholars Ibrahim Muhawi and Sharif Kanaana, is very popular in the Arab world.

=== Motifs ===
French ethnologist Camille Lacoste-Dujardin, in regards to a Kabylian variant, noted that the sisters' jealousy originated from their perceived infertility, and that their promises of grand feats of domestic chores were a matter of "capital importance" to them.

Hasan El-Shamy remarked that in Middle Eastern tales the royal children, born of the third sister, are a brother-sister twin pair.

== Variants ==
=== Algeria ===
In an Algerian variant collected in Blida by Joseph Desparmet from informant Fatma bent Eldjennâdî, titled La Ghoule Secourable, a king announces his plans to marry, and orders every possible maiden to pass by his window. One day, three girls pass under the king's window: the first promises to feed the king's troops with just a plate of couscous, the second that she can weave garments for the whole troop with wool from a single fleece, and the third that the will bear the king a girl and a boy, both with golden and silver hair. The king marries the first girl and, when she fails on her promise, he divorces her. The same happens to the second girl. He lastly marries the third one, to the envy of the other two. The jealous women seek the services of a Settout (an evil old woman), to act as the queen's midwife. The Settout replaces the queen's first child, a boy, for a puppy and casts him in a box in the river. The same happens with the second child, a girl. They are saved and raised by a fisherman and his wife. Some years later, the fisherman's own children mock the boy and the girl and they leave home. They buy a house and the brother meets the king. The jealous women tell the Settout, who visits the sister while her brother is away. The Settout tells her first about the Les Pommes de Senteur et L’Eau qui rend la vie (Algerian: Etteffâḥ ennifouḥ ou elmâ llî irodd errouḥ, English: “Scented Apples and Water of Life”); then about Le Basilic qui claque et L’eau qui ulule (Algerian: Elḥbeq elli iseffeq ou el mâ llî iouelouel; English: “The Basil that claps and Ululating Water”). When the brother brings the basil and the ululating water, they do not move at all, which the Settout attributes to the absence of their master, L’Aigle Vert (“The Green Eagle”), a little bird in a cage. Lastly, the Settout tells them about the owner of the Green Eagle, a beautiful maiden named Lalla Loundja. With the help of a Ghoule, the brother gets all items to his sister. At the end of the tale, Lalla Loundja marries the brother, and suggests the siblings invite the king and his viziers to a banquet, during which she reveals the truth and reunites the family. French ethnologist Camille Lacoste-Dujardin, in her study about the Kabylian oral repertoire, listed La Ghoule Secourable as a Kabylian variant of type 707.

In a variant from Beni Snous collected by E. Destaing from informant Si El-Haoussin Ben El-Hadj Ennacer and translated as Le fils et la fille du roi ("The Son and The Daughter of the King"), a king and his ministers go with some troops to a mountain. When they rest and drink a bit of water, three girls come by the fountain and talk to one another what they can do if the sultan marries one of them: the first promises to feed the troops with a single grain; the second that she can weave garments for the whole troop with a single fleece; and the third that she can bear the sultan twins, a boy and a girl with "golden and silver horns". The sultan asks his minister to bring the first girl (the pacha's daughter) to prove her skills; she fails and is sent back to her father. He then summons the judge's daughter (the second girl) to test her weaving skills; she also fails. He then summons the third girl and marries her, to the jealousy of the sultan's other wives. The sultan's co-wives hire the Settout to replace the children for animals and to cast them in the water. The twins are saved by a fisherman named Mohammed. Years later, the boy, now called Mhammed, meets with the sultan at a café. The sultan's co-wives ask Settout to get rid of the boy. The old woman sends him on three quests: firstly, for the singing bird; secondly, for a steed named Baberkat; lastly, for a maiden named Zohra bent Zehour. Zohra bent Zehour marries Mhammed and suggests her husband and his sister invite the sultan for a banquet. During the banquet, Zohra bent Zahour tells their story and shows the sultan the twins' horns of gold and silver. Destaing identified this tale as a variant of the Arabian Nights tale "Histoire de Les Deux Soeurs Jalouses de leur Cadette", which was confirmed by Camille Lacoste-Dujardin as belonging to tale type 707.

French orientalist Samuel Biarnay collected and published a Berber language variant from Ouargla with the title Tanfoust n Zahouet eddenia (Histoire de Zahouet Eddenia): the king's mother takes her grandchildren and casts them in the water, but they are saved by a fisherman. An old lady goes to the twins' house and convinces the girl to seek the water from between the stones, the pomegranate of the pomegranate trees and l’halib lboui (a curdled milk from the stomach of a young ogre). Lastly, the old lady convinces her to send her brother for a maiden named Zahouet Eddenia, a prisoner guarded by an army of scorpions, scarabs and serpents, and by her brother, a bird that petrifies people with his breath. The male twin is petrified by the bird, but his sister goes after him and defeats the bird. Zahouet Eddenia is rescued by the male twin and brought with them. This tale is also a variant of tale type 707.

In an Algerian tale collected by Jeanne Scelles-Mille with the title Les deux jumeaux and translated to Spanish with the title Los dos gemelos ("The (Two) Twins"), a king rules his country, the years weighing heavily on him as he realizes he wants to find a wife for himself. News of his search reaches the ears of a woman with three children, who each reveal their skills to their mother: the elder boasts she is a good enough cook she can cook for an army. Her mother wishes that she does not go, but the elder goes anyway and boasts to the king she can cook for the whole army with a bag of semola and a bag of salt. She prepares inedible pastries for everyone, and the king dismisses her to the royal kitchen. Next, the middle one boasts to her mother she is a skilled seamstress, and tells the king she can sew clothes for the entire army with a single piece of fabric. She only manages to cut little squares of cloth for the soldiers, and is sent to work with a real taylor. Finally, the cadette tells her mother she wants to marry the king for love of him, and promises the monarch she will bear twins, a girl with hair of gold and a boy with hair of silver, whose name will be Malhum min Rabbi ("their treasure comes from God"). The king marries the youngest sisters, to the elder two's envy. When the new queen becomes pregnant, the elder sisters bribe a witch to act as midwife: the witch replaces the twins for puppies and cast them in the water in a box. The box is fished out of the water by a poor fisherman, who takes the twins to his wife, asking her to raise the twins along with their six children. Despite their poverty, the fisherman and his wife find gold and silver coins in the twins' hair. Years later, the twins notice they are adopted, and decide to leave their adoptive family for another place. The siblings reach the city ruled by the king, and are hosted in their grandparents' house, unaware of their relationship. The twins ask their hosts about their sadness, and the woman tells them about their daughter locked in the chicken coop as punishment for bearing puppies. The twins decide to take a visit to the woman at the chicken coop and marvel at their physical similarity with the prisoner. The next day, the female twin learns about where the witch lives in the city and pays her a visit: she tosses the witch inside the cauldron and forces her to reveal the whole truth. The twins order the king to remove the woman from the chicken coop, bathe her and dress in her in dignified clothes, then brought to the king's presence, so that the monarch can attest their resemblance. The king discovers the twins are his children, and punishes the elder sisters and the witch.

In an Algerian tale collected in 2005 from an informant in Eastern Algeria, in El Tarf, with the title "حكايـةالطـير ليغنـي وجناحه يرد عليه" ("The Story of The Bird Which Sings and His Wing Replying to Him"), shortened to The Singing Bird, three women are drawing water by the fountain and spot a shepherd with his flock, then each promises grand feats if he wishes to marry one of them: the third promises to bear him twins, a boy with golden forehead and a girl with half of hair of silver and the other of gold. The shepherd overhears their conversation and marries all three. The third wife gives birth to her promised boy, but the other co-wives and the midwife replace him for a puppy and cast him in the wilderness. The boy is found by a hunter. The following year, the woman gives birth to a girl who is replaces by a cat and cast in the wilderness, but she is found by the same hunter, who raises the duo. As for the children's mother, the shepherd falls for his co-wives' deception, believes her to be a monster and places her in a pen to live with the animals. When the children are older, the siblings learn they are foundlings and move out of the hunter's house next to the shepherd's, their fathers, home. One day, their father notices the boy and girl and falls in love with the girl's beauty. Afraid of their husband discovering the truth, the co-wives send an ogre to trick the female sibling into searching for the Bird that Sings and Its Wing Replies to It. The brother goes to search for it, but falls under the bird's petrifying spell. His sister follows after him to rescue him, suckles an ogress's breasts to win her over to her side, and is given instructions how to approach the bird without falling victim to its spell. The sister reaches the bird's location and waits until it perches on a branch. Per the ogress's instructions, the sister takes out the branch the bird perched on last and uses it on the statue of her brother, restoring him to life. They take the bird and return home. Later, on the wedding ceremony between the shepherd's marriage and the girl, the Singing Bird cautions them about their relationship, and they discover their familial connection. The man questions the midwife, learns the truth, and punishes the two other co-wives by tying them to horses. He releases his third wife from the animal pen and reunites with his children.

==== Kabylia ====
Algerian writer Rabah Belamri collected a tale from his aunt in Bougaa, near Kabylie. In the story, titled La fille du forgeron ("The Blacksmith's Daughter"), a sultan has two barren co-wives. One day, he visits a village. There, three girls are talking among themselves: the first, the daughter of the woodsman, says she can make a whole plate of couscous with only a grain of wheat; the second, the daughter of the carpenter, says she can make a beautiful burnous with only a tuft of wool; the third, the titular daughter of the blacksmith, says if she marries the sultan, she will give birth to a son with a temple of gold and the other of silver; another son with teeth of pearls and diamonds and a girl more beautiful than the sun. The sultan marries the third sister and makes her his new queen. As soon as her promised children are born, her jealous elder sisters, with the help of an old witch named Séttoute, throw them in the sea and replace them for puppies. The new queen is forced to eat with the dogs, while the children are found by a fisherman, who takes them in on orders of the archangel Gabriel, since the children are protected by God. Years later, the fisherman, on their deathbed, gives the children a magic object which the archangel Gabriel gave him, as his last gift. The three siblings use the object to transport to their father's city. His aunts, noticing their survival, send the Séttoute to get rid of them: the witch sends them on a quest for a mare with ten colts, and to find the beautiful maiden Hadd-Ezzine as a wife for the elder brother. The elder brother fetches the mare with the help of an old man named Baba-Mordjan, and fights Hadd-Ezzine for forty days before she admits defeat and accompanies him. At the end of the tale, the sultan sights the female sibling and wishes to marry her, unaware she is his daughter. The sultan invites his three other wives, including the disgraced queen, to witness the ceremony, and Hadd-Ezzine insists the third queen tells her story. She does, and Hadd-Ezzine takes off her husband's cap to show his shining body parts of gold and silver, tickles the middle brother so he laughs to show his teeth of pearls and diamonds, and unveils her sister-in-law to show her beautiful face. The sultan learns the whole truth, and punishes his sisters-in-law and the witch Séttoute.

Two versions have been recorded by German ethnographer Leo Frobenius in his Atlantis book collection. In the first tale, Die ausgesetzten Geschwister ("The abandoned sisters"), seven sisters go to fetch wood. The youngest feels a bit tired and rests beneath a tree with two other sisters. While they are resting, one young "Agelith" passes by and the sisters announce their promises: the elder that she will feed many people with a handful of wheat; the second that she can feed an entire city with a sheepskin; the third that she will bear him a son with a silver stars and silver moon in his hair, and a girl with a golden sun on the front. They are found by a fisherman and live in their hut. Years pass, and the aunts' accomplice, an old witch, convinces them to search for the Tär Lemeghani ("The Singing Bird") and water from the fountain located where the rocks collide. The brother also rescues several petrified people in the area. In the second, Die goldhaarigen Kinder ("The Golden-Haired Children"), which was identified by Frobenius as a variant of the former, the youngest sister promises to give birth to twin boys with golden hair on the front (taunsa-ne-d'hav). Both variants were later identified as Kabylian.

French missionary Joseph Rivière collected a Kabylian variant from Djurdjura with the title Les enfants et la chauve-souris ("The Children and the Bat"): a man has two wives, the first is barren, while the younger gives birth to eight children in succession. Each time, the first wife takes a child and abandons them in the forest. The story tells that God rescues the children and the youngest sister prepares the food for her brothers. One day, an old woman comes to their house and tells the girl that her brothers can get her a bat if they love her. Each of the seven brothers fail in getting the bat, for the animal uses its magical powers to turn their guns into pieces of wood and to reduce their sizes. The girl captures the bat and restores her brothers to normal, as soon as the bat makes her promise to dress it in gold and silver. The bat leads the eight children to their father's house, but the father's second wife poisons the food. The bat warns them to avoid eating whatever the animals will eat. The animals eat a poisoned couscous and die. The sister prepares the food for her brothers. The bat touches the eyes of the children and the eight siblings recognize their parents. The first wife is punished. In a late-19th century study, scholar W. A. Clouston related this tale to other variants of The Sisters Envious of Their Cadette, from the compilation The Arabian Nights. Lacoste-Dujardin also grouped this tale with other North African variants of type ATU 707.

== See also ==
- The Bird from the Land of Gabour
- Little Nightingale the Crier
- The Story of Arab-Zandiq
