= Ásdís Thoroddsen =

Icelandic director, producer, screenwriter, and actress

- Born: 26 February 1959 (age 66); Reykjavík, Iceland
- Occupations: Filmmaker; scriptwriter; producer; actress
- Notable work: Ingaló

Ásdís Thoroddsen (born 26 February 1959) is an Icelandic director, producer, screenwriter, and actress.

== Biography ==
Thoroddsen was born on 26 February 1959 in Reykjavík, Iceland. She started her career in film as an assistant on the set of an adaptation of Halldór Laxness's novel Le Paradis for the German channel NDR in 1979. After working at the RÚV from 1979 to 1981, she studied theater in Gothenburg. In 1983, she starred in the film Skilaboð til Söndru by Kristin Pálsdóttir. The same year, she joined the German Academy of Film and Television Berlin.

She shot her first feature film in 1992, Ingaló, the story of a rebellious girl and her brother in an Icelandic fishing village. The film was selected for the International Critics' Week at the Cannes Film Festival. She won the Grand Jury Prize at the 1993 Rouen Nordic Film Festival and Solveig Arnarsdóttir, the actress in Ingaló, won the Best Actress Award. The film is also selected for the festival of New Directors and New Films at the Museum of Modern Art and Lincoln Center in New York City in 1993.

Ásdís Thoroddsen writes scripts for her own films. She also writes for radio and stage, as well as a radio play, Ástand, which was selected for the Prix Europa in 2011. She founded the company Gjóla, which produces films and plays.

In September 2016, Sæmundur published the first novel on Ásdís Thoroddsen, Utan þjónustusvæðis – krónika.

== Filmography ==
=== Director ===
- Ingaló (1992)
- Draumadísir (1995)
- Heimsljós (short) (2003)
- Á þjóðvegi 48 (short) (2006)
- On Northern Waters — a Story of a Boat (org. Súðbyrðingur – saga báts) (documentary) (2010)
- We are still here (org. Veðrabrigði) (documentary) (2015)
- Form and Function- Handicraft and History of the Icelandic National Costumes] (documentary) (2017)
- The Bountiful Land — Icelandic Food Traditions and Food History (org. Gósenlandið — íslenskar matarhefðir og matarsaga) (documentary) (2019)
- Woods Grew Here Once (org. Milli fjalls og fjöru) (documentary) (2021)
- The Times of the Trolls (org. Tímar tröllanna) (documentary) (2022)
- Of Strings and Song — Music in the 19th Century Iceland (org. Frá ómi til hljóms — tónlistin á dögum Sveins Þórarinssonar amtskrifara) (documentary) (2025)

=== Acting ===
- Skilaboð til Söndru (1983)
- Nói albínói (2003)
