= Estela Gavidia =

Salvadorian female doctor

Estela Gavidia was in 1945 the first woman to graduate as a doctor in El Salvador She specialized in gynecology. At the time of her graduation she was married and thus known as Dr. Grabowski; she was eventually widowed.
