= Hilda Stevenson-Delhomme =

Seychellois politician and doctor

- Portrait of Hilda Stevenson-Delhomme
- Born: Marie Hilda Stevenson; March 8, 1912; Mahé, Seychelles
- Died: January 4, 2002 (aged 89); Lons-le-Saunier, Jura, France
- Education: Skerry's College
- Occupations: politician; doctor
- Spouse: Andre Delhomme (m. 1949)
- Children: 4: Helene; Veronique; Allen (adopted); Caroline (adopted)
- Parents: Ti Jean Stevenson (father); Amelia Stevenson (mother)

Marie Hilda Stevenson-Delhomme CBE (née Stevenson; March 8, 1912 – January 4, 2002) was a Seychellois politician and medical doctor. She was the Seychelles' first female politician.

== Early life and education ==
Born as Marie Hilda Stevenson on March 8, 1912, she was the only daughter of Ti Jean Stevenson Amelia Stevenson. She started her early education at the Convents in Victoria, Seychelles and Ayrshire, Scotland. She obtained her first degree at Skerry's College before proceeding to study medicine. She is a licentiate of the Royal College of Surgeons of Edinburgh, the Royal College of Physicians and the Royal College of Surgeons.

== Career ==
In 1939, Stevenson-Delhomme returned to the Seychelles where she practiced medicine until in 1944 when she returned to Scotland in order to further her education. During the World War II, she was active in emergency services in several hospitals in Scotland. A return to the Seychelles following the ill-health of her mother saw her practice medicine privately.

In 1951 she was elected as one of the members of the Legislative Council. In 1952, Stevenson-Delhomme was instrumental in the fight against tuberculosis by founding the Tuberculosis Funds Programme to assist sufferers discharged from hospital. In 1954, she became medical officer of the Red Cross Society in the Seychelles. She became the Seychelles first female parliamentarian following her appointment as member of the National Assembly in 1967 after forming her own now-defunct political party "Parti Seselwa" in 1964.

== Death ==
She died on January 4, 2001, in France, aged 88.

== Recognitions ==
- Commander of the Most Excellent Order of the British Empire
- Serving Sister of the Order of St John of Jerusalem

== Legacy ==
In recognition for her contributions to politics and health in Seychelles, the Stevenson-Delhomme Road in Saint Louis, Seychelles is named after her.
