= Fanny Friedman =

Swazi doctor and political figure

- Born: Frances Friedman; 21 June 1926 (age 99)
- Other names: Fannie Friedman
- Occupations: Physician, Politician

Fanny Friedman MBE (sometimes spelled Fannie Friedman, born Frances Friedman on 21, June 1926) is a doctor and political figure in Eswatini (also known as Swaziland). Friedman was also the first woman in her country's history to hold the post of minister and first female Senator in her Country from 1987 to 1993.

== Biography ==
Fanny Friedman practiced as a Doctor in several Eswatini Hospitals and participated in the works of several non-governmental organizations. She was an Advocate for the strengthening of maternal health care in her Country. In 1994, she wrote the foreword to the book Contemporary Issues in Maternal Health Care in Africa.

In 1968, Friedman was appointed as Permanent Secretary (now known as Principal Secretary) in the Ministry of Health. She served as Director of Health Services and was a graduate of the Faculty of Medicine at the University of Cape Town, South Africa. She was a member of World Health Organisation (WHO) Governing body and the World Health Assembly Regional Committee. In 1975, Friedman was awarded a WHO fellowship to study public health, her MPH Program was in Belgium for 6 months and in Holland for 6 months.

She was a member of Parliament from 1983 to 1987 and a senator from 1987 to 1997. In November 1987, she was the first woman in her country's history to hold the post of minister after she was appointed head of the Ministry of Health. She left the position in 1993.

Friedman was the first female Swazi physician who also specialised in public health as well as the first female cabinet minister in the history of her country.

In 2018, Friedman was featured in an online publication “Portrait of a Swazi Woman: 50 Women, 50 Years” celebrating her achievements and contributions to Eswatini society.
