= Junilyn Pikacha =

Medical practitioner from the Solomon Islands

Junilyn Pikacha (December 25, 1952 – November 10, 2010) was the first female medical practitioner in the Solomon Islands.

Born Junilyn Galo, Pikacha was the eldest of the nine children of Paul Galo, who taught at Ruruvai Primary School on Choiseul, and his wife Noge. Between 1954 and 1957 her family moved to Papua New Guinea so that her father could teach at the Konkavul Seventh-Day Adventist district school on New Hanover Island, and also at the North Bismarck Mission. Junilyn attended Kambubu Secondary School beginning in 1967; after leaving in 1970 she matriculated in 1971 at Sopas Nursing School in the highlands of Papua New Guinea. Thanks to her performance, she was granted a scholarship, and studied medicine at the University of Papua New Guinea from 1972 until 1978. There she met and married Douglas Pikacha, also a student. In 1974 she bore a son, Patrick, and in 1978 a daughter, Nola. Her husband became Registrar at Rabaul's Nonga Hospital, and she took a medical position there; a year later they moved to Kimbe and Biala, and in 1981 once again to Kerema. Douglas specialized in surgery, a discipline which Junilyn preferred; consequently, instead she worked in obstetrics and gynaecology.

The Pikachas returned to the Solomon Islands in 1981; from 1982 to 1984 they served at 'Atoifi Adventist Hospital on Malaita. In 1985 they moved to Honiara to work at the Central Hospital. Between August 1987 and December 1988 they were in Honolulu, where husband and wife completed Masters in Public Health degrees at the University of Hawaii's East-West Centre. In 1988 they returned again to the Solomon Islands, and from then until 2009 Junilyn served at the Reproductive Health Department of what had become the National Referral Hospital. She rose to become Director of Maternal and Child Health, while her husband became Director of Surgery. Another son, Douglas, was born to the couple in 1992. For some time, Junilyn operated a private women's health clinic. She also served as the Director of the Reproductive Health Division of the Solomon Islands government, published research papers and other writings, and served on the board of the Regional Training and Operational Research Centre on Reproductive Health and Family Planning in the Pacific for the United Nations. Diagnosed with cancer in 2008, she died in 2010.
