= Margaret Lin Xavier =

Khun Ying Lin Srivisarvacha
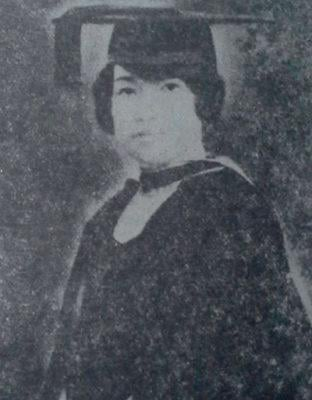
- Born: Margaret Lin Xavier; 29 May 1898; Bangkok, Siam
- Died: 6 December 1932 (aged 34); Bangkok, Siam
- Spouse: Phraya Srivisarvacha (Thianliang Huntrakul)
- Children: 3
- Parent(s): Phraya Bibadh Kosha (Celestino Maria Xavier); Kim Kee

Margaret Lin Xavier or Khun Ying Srivisarvacha (29 May 1898 – 6 December 1932), known colloquially as Dr. Lin, was a Thai physician. She was the first Thai woman to receive a degree in medicine.

== Early life and education ==
Margaret Lin Xavier was born on 29 May 1898 in Bangkok, Thailand (then Siam), to Celestino Maria Xavier, known as Phraya Sri Phipat Kosa, the Under-Secretary of State for Foreign Affairs, and Kim Kee. She was sent to study at the Holy Sacred Heart of Jesus Convent in Singapore. Upon her father's foreign posting as the Thai ambassador to Italy, Xavier entered Clark's Commercial College in London. She then passed matriculation and entered the London School of Medicine for Women and the Royal Free Hospital. She obtained an MBBS, MRCS, and LRCP.

== Career ==
Following her father's death, Xavier returned to Thailand in 1924 and became an obstetrician and worked for the Thai Red Cross Society, King Chulalongkorn Memorial Hospital, and the medical facility in Bang Rak District under the Ministry of Public Health. She also established a medical clinic called "Unakan" with her half sister Chan Xavier as the clinic's pharmacist.

Xavier tended to patients of all social classes, not only Thai aristocracy. As the Bang Rak medical facility was for treatment of sexually transmitted diseases, many of her patients were impoverished sex workers, whom she would treat free of charge. Even when she was breastfeeding, Margaret still continued to work, going home to breastfeed in the middle of the work day and returning to work in the afternoon. She opted to breastfeed the children herself, despite the fact that a woman of her status during that time would have employed the help of a wet nurse.

A highlight of Xavier's career occurred on 12 August 1932, when she delivered Mom Rajawongse Sirikit Kitiyakara, who would become Queen Sirikit, the queen consort of King Bhumibol Adulyadej (or Rama IX) and the mother of King Vajiralongkorn (or Rama X).

== Personal life ==
=== Marriage to Phraya Srivisarvacha ===
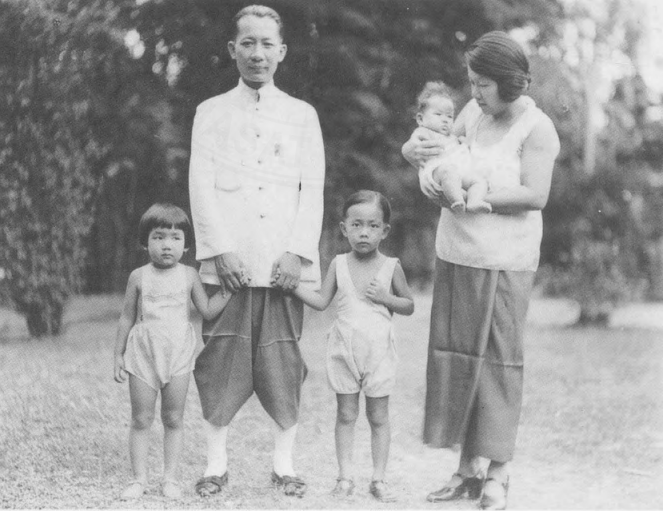
Srivarvacha's Family

Xavier married Phraya Srivisarvacha on 15 August 1926. He would become the Minister of Foreign Affairs of Thailand in 1932. She was bestowed the title of Khun Ying Srivisarvacha. They had two daughters, Than Phu Ying Manatsanit Vanikul (née Srivisarvacha) and Khun Ying Sawitri Osathanugrah, and one son, Kittirat Srivisarvacha.

=== Death ===
Xavier contracted encephalitis and died due to complications of influenza on 6 December 1932. She was 34.

== Tribute ==
On 29 May 2020, Google celebrated her life with a Google Doodle.
