= Kristín Ólafsdóttir =

First Icelandic woman physician (1889–1971)

- Born: November 21, 1889
- Died: August 20, 1971
- Education: Menntaskólinn í Reykjavík (stúdentspróf), University of Iceland, (medicine)
- Occupation: Physician

Kristín Ólafsdóttir (November 21, 1889 – August 20, 1971) was an Icelandic doctor and the first woman to complete her medical certification through the University of Iceland. Kristín's parents were Reverend Ólafur Ólafson, a provost of the town of Hjarðarholt in Dalir, and Ingibjörg Pálsdóttir.

== Personal Life and Education ==
Kristín finished her stúdentspróf externally through Reykjavik College in 1911 and was the third woman in Iceland do so. She completed her medical exams through the University of Iceland on February 15, 1917. In 1916, she married Vilmundur Jónsson, the doctor that served as the Director of Health from 1931–1959. Kristín and Vilmundur had three children: Guðrún Vilmundardóttir (a housewife), Ólaf Vilmundardóttir (a denturist), and Þórhallur Vilmundarson (professor at the University of Iceland).

== Career ==
Kristín worked in Sweden and Denmark from 1918–1919, then in Ísafjörður until 1931 when she began operating her own clinic in Reykjavik, which she ran until the end of her life.

Kristín taught hygiene in the women's homemaking school Ósk in Ísafjörður. She was one of the founders of the Society of Academic Women (Félags háskólakvenna) in 1928, served on the school board of the Reykjavik Homemaking School (Hússtjórnarskóli Reykjavíkur) from 1941–1946, and served on the child protection committee from 1946–1952. Kristín wrote several publications about diet and health and translated some publications.

== Legacy ==
On the University of Iceland's 100th birthday in 2011, the school had a portrait made of Kristín as a gift. It is located in the school's main building.
