= Ulai Otobed =

Palauan physician

Ulai Trudy Otobed (born 31 December 1941) is a Palauan physician. In 1965 she became the first Micronesian woman to qualify as a doctor. Also a table tennis player, she won a gold medal in the sport at the 1963 South Pacific Games and was national champion of Fiji in three categories.

== Biography ==
Otobed was born in Aimeliik on the Palauan island of Babeldaob to Berenges Oiterong and Taurengel Otobed, the second of six children. Her brother Rechiuang Demai Otobed went on to become the first Palauan to earn a degree in entomology. She began attending school in Ngeremlengui at the age of six. Between 1953 and 1956 she was a pupil at Palau Intermediate School. She then moved up to Pacific Islands Central School, where she was enrolled between 1956 and 1959. After being accepted into the Central Medical School in Fiji, she attended the Trust Territory School of Nursing until her course began in 1960. During her time in Fiji she was part of the Fiji table tennis team that won gold at the 1963 South Pacific Games. The following year she was Fijian national champion in women's singles, women's doubles and mixed doubles.

Otobed graduated from the Central Medical School in 1965, also winning numerous awards, including the Principal's Presentation for the top female student, the Glazo-Allenburgs prize for the highest grade average and the British Medical Association gold medal for academic excellence in surgery. She then did a two-year internship at McDonald Memorial Hospital, passing the Trust Territory Medical Board Examinations in 1968.

In 1968 Otobed spent six months training in New Zealand, passing the Auckland Hospital Board exam and receiving a diploma in obstetrics in 1969. She returned to New Zealand to study at the Postgraduate School of Obstetrics and Gynaecology at the University of Auckland between 1970 and 1973, also working at the National Women's Hospital as a surgeon and registrar. After receiving a diploma in obstetrics and gynaecology, she came back to Koror in Palau in 1973 to work at the McDonald Memorial Hospital. Between 1974 and 1976 she attended Mysore Medical College in India, earning a BSc in medicine and surgery. In 1977 she passed the American Examination for Foreign Medical Graduates.

After returning to Palau to work as a physician in Obstetrics, Gynecology and Family Planning at McDonald Memorial Hospital, Otobed later became Head of Clinical Services at the national hospital. She also served on the Palau National Scholarship Board.
