= The Story of Arab-Zandiq =

Modern Egyptian folktale

The story of the Princess Arab-Zandīq or The Story of ‘Arab-Zandīq (French: L'Histoire d'Arab-Zandyq) is a modern Egyptian folktale collected in the late 19th century by Guillaume Spitta Bey. It is related to the theme of the calumniated wife and classified in the international Aarne-Thompson-Uther Index as type ATU 707, "The Three Golden Children". These tales refer to stories where a girl promises a king she will bear a child or children with wonderful attributes, but her jealous relatives or the king's wives plot against the babies and their mother. Variants are collected in Egypt and across North Africa.

== Summary ==
A king calls his vizier to join him in visiting the city at night. They see a light in the distance and approach it. Inside, three women talk to each other: the first promises to bake a large pancake for the king and his army; the second that she can weave a tent large enough to accommodate the king and his army; and the third promises to bear the king twins, a boy and a girl with alternate hairs of gold and hyacinth (gold and jasper, in a Hungarian translation), and their laughter will make the sun and the moon appear, and when they weep the skies shall thunder and rain. (In a translation by E. A. Wallis Budge, the third woman says her daughter will have golden hair and her son "hyacinthine locks").

The next day the king summons the three women and marries them. He sleeps with the first two on two separate nights, and they fail to deliver their promises. The third woman gives birth to a son and a daughter. The midwife is bribed by the other wives to replace the twins for two blind dogs and to cast them in a box into the river. The king sees the blind puppies and, feeling he was deceived, orders the woman to be tied to the stairs and covered with pitch, and for everyone to spit on her.

As for the twins, the box is saved by a fisherman who lives on an island. He and his wife raise the twins. Years pass, and one day, the fisherman takes the boy to the market to sell his fishes. The king passes by the market and sees the boy, named Muhammed. Sensing a strange connection to the boy, he pays the fishes and takes the boy with him to the palace. The king later sends the boy back to the fisherman. Meanwhile, the king's wife notices the boy is one of the children the midwife was supposed to kill. The midwife tells the king's wife not to worry, for she has a plan to get rid of the boy and his sister.

The midwife puts her plans into action: she goes to the fisherman's hut and finds the sister of the clever Muhammed (Muhammed the Discreet, in W. A. Clouston's translation) sitting alone. The woman goads the sister into sending Muhammed after the singing rose of a maiden named Arab-Zandiq. The boy rides until he reaches the house of an ogress, suckles her breasts and salutes her. The ogress tells him that his deed earned him her favour. After Muhammed talks about the singing rose, the ogress tells him about the garden where it is located: he is to exchange the fodder of a goat and a lion, then a gate will open, and he is to take the flower with him and flee before he becomes stone.

It happens as the ogress describes. Muhammed takes the rose back to his sister. Some time later, he visits the king again, and the midwife returns to the fisherman's hut: the rose will not sing unless the mirror is near it. The girl sends her brother to get the mirror. Muhammed goes back to he ogress, who this time advises him to go beyond the garden, up a staircase and find the mirror in a room.

The boy brings back the mirror. The midwife returns to the fisherman's hut and convinces the sister to ask for Arab-Zandiq herself. Muhammed goes back to the ogress, who warns him that many have tried to get her and failed, doomed to be turned into stone by her powers. Muhammed rides his horse to Arab-Zandiq's palace, puts his horse's head against a wall of the palace and shouts at the maiden's window for her to appear. Arab-Zandiq, from her window, tries to shoo away the boy, and the horse and him are slowly transformed into stone. The third time, Arab-Zandiq leans out of the window, her hair reaching the ground. Muhammed seizes the opportunity to pull her out of the window by her hair. Defeated, the maiden tells the boy she is destined for him, and disenchants the many stones in her palace.

Muhammed brings Arab-Zandiq with him to his sister. Arab-Zandiq orders her servants to build a palace in the fisherman's island, and tells Muhammed to invite the king to their new palace for his wedding with Arab-Zandiq. The king becomes impressed with the boy's palace and invites the boy, his wife and his sister to the royal palace.

So the three go to the royal palace. Arab-Zandiq sees the poor woman shackled to the stairs and covers her with a shawl. The king's servants take notice of this act of kindness and question the guest. Arab-Zandiq orders them to take the woman, bathe and cleanse her, and to provide her with new clothes. During the banquet with the king, the fisherman reveals he found the box with the twins in the river and raised the two. The twins' mother, brought to the banquet, recognizes her children by their hairs of hyacinth and gold. The king still wants them to prove their relationship, so they weep and thunders roar and it rains; they laugh, and the sun and the moon appear. The king celebrates that his family is reunited and burns his wife and the midwife.

== Analysis ==
=== Tale type ===
The tale is classified in the international Aarne-Thompson-Uther Index as type ATU 707, "The Three Golden Children", a tale type that, according to scholars Ibrahim Muhawi and Sharif Kanaana, is very popular in the Arab world.

In a late-19th century study, scholar W. A. Clouston listed L'Histoire d'Arab-Zandik as the "Modern Arabic" version of The Sisters Envious of Their Cadette, from the compilation The Arabian Nights. French comparativist Emmanuel Cosquin also related the Egyptian tale to a French story about a calumniated wife, her children of wondrous aspect and a quest for magical objects.

=== Motifs ===
French ethnologist Camille Lacoste-Dujardin, in regards to a Kabylian variant, noted that the sisters' jealousy originated from their perceived infertility, and that their promises of grand feats of domestic chores were a matter of "capital importance" to them.

Hasan El-Shamy remarked that in Middle Eastern tales the royal children, born of the third sister, are a brother-sister twin pair.

W. A. Clouston noted that the fairy Arab-Zandyk replaces the Speaking Bird of the other variants of type 707 in revealing the truth to the king.

Philologist Johannes Østrup ascribed an "Oriental" origin to the motif of the monarch banning lighting candles at night, which appears in many of the variants.

Another motif that appears in these variants is the hero suckling an ogress's breastmilk during the quest for the objects.

== Variants ==
=== Egypt ===
El-Shamy mentioned that 14 variants of the tale type exist in the Egyptian archives (as of the 1980s).

==== The Nightingale that Shrieked ====
In the tale The Nightingale that Shrieked, collected by Inea Bushnaq, the youngest sister promises twins: "a boy with locks of gold and silver" and a girl who can make the sun shine with her smile and rain fall with her weeping. Years later, they are sent on a quest for the Tree with Apples that dance and Apricots that sing and the Bulbul Assiah, the Nightingale that Shrieks, both tasks completed only by the brother.

==== The Promises of the Three Sisters ====
In a tale El-Shamy collected from a female teller in a village in the Nile Delta and published with the title The Promises of the Three Sisters, a king forces a ban on lighting candles at night. He goes with his vizier to check on the people and sees an illuminated house. Inside, three sisters are weaving and talking: the eldest promises to bake a cake to feed the king and his army; the second that she will weave a carpet to sit the entire army; and the third that she will bear twins, a boy named Clever Muhammed and a girl called Sitt el-Husn ("Mistress of Beauty"), both with golden and silver hair. Years later, the twins quest for the "dancing bamboo, singing water and talking lark". Clever Muhammed, the brother, obtains the first two items, but fails in the third quest. The sister saves him and gets the bird. Author and translator Praline Gay-Para readapted the tale, along with the variant The Nightingale That Shrieked, and translated it to French as L'Alouette hurleuse ("The Screaming Lark").

==== El-Schater Mouhammed ====
In a tale collected by Yacoub Artin Pacha in the Nile Valley with the title El-Schater Mouhammed, a king forbids lighting candles at night. Three sisters, daughters of a bean seller, disobey the ban and light a candle one night. The king goes to the city with his vizier and dervishes to enforce the ban, and see the three sisters' house. They overhear their conversation: the elder wants to marry the king and promises to spread silk from their house to the palace; the second claims she can bake a cake grand enough for him and the people; the youngest promises to give birth to twins, a boy and a girl, the boy having hair of gold and silver and, when he cries, the sky will be clouded, it will be cold and rainy, and when he laughs, the skies will be clear, even in winter. Years later, the midwife tricks the king that the twins, the boy named El-Chater Mouhammed and the girl Sit-el-Hôsn oual Gamal, intent to dethrone the king, and suggests to give the twins the quest for the objects: the Tree of Sitti-Han (El-Chater obtains the tree and marries its owner, a maiden named Sitti-Han) and "a baby or infant who can speak eloquently".

=== North Africa ===
Author E. M Chadli listed variants found in the Maghreb region: L'uccelo della verità ("The Bird of Truth"), by Destaing; "Il figlio e la figlia del re" ("The King's Son and Daughter"), by Biarnay; La storia di Zaohuet ed-Denia ("The Story of Zaohuet ed-Denia"), by Huet; La storia della tre sorelle ("The tale of the three sisters"), by Legey; L'ucello del paese dell'aratura ("The Bird from the Plowing Country"), by Pellar; Storie di tre donne ("Tale of three girls"), by Lacoste-Dujardin; and Il principe e la principessa alle fonti d'oro e l'universo, by Khatibi.

==== Tunisia ====
In a Tunisian version collected from teller Lela Ula with the title En busca del pájaro esmeralda ("The quest for the emerald bird"), a sultan wears a disguise to spy on his subjects at night and forbids to light any candle at night. One night, however, three sisters disobey his ban and begin to spin and weave. The sultan comes to their house and listens to their conversation: the eldest claims to be able to cook a soup like the sultan has never tasted; the middle one that she can prepare a delicious ftat, and the youngest that she will bear the sultan three children, two boys with silver hair and a girl with golden hair. The sultan marries each of the sisters, hoping that they will prove their claims. The elder two fail and are locked in the attic, while the youngest gives birth to the three children, but the midwife replaces the children for little animals and takes them with her. The children grow up and meet the king, to the sisters' horror. To assuage their fears, an evil old woman named Asuset essetút visits the siblings' house and convinces them to seek the ettufáh el-li ifúh / wi irud errúh lirrúh ("perfumed apples that restore the soul"), and the emerald bird that sings. The emerald bird reveals the truth in a banquet with the sultan.

In a Tunisian tale translated into Russian as "Смертельная зависть" ("Mortal Jealousy"), three sisters tell one another their dreams about future husbands: the elder to the royal cook, the middle one to the chamberlain, and the youngest to the king himself, and she will bear him a son and a daughter. The king overhears their conversation and brings them to the palace to fulfill their dreams. Envying their cadette's fortunate marriage, the elder sisters take the boy and the daughter as soon as they are born (in consecutive pregnancies), replace them for a kitten and a monkey, and cast in the water. The babies are found by a hunter and, years later, are sent for a singing bird. The brother fails and is turned to stone; the sister prevails, rescues him and gets the bird.

In a Tunisian tale titled M'hammed, le fils du sultan ("M'hammed, the son of the Sultan"), a sultan moves away from his family to another city. Six of his seven sons tell their mother they wish to pay a visit to their father, joined by their father's valet Saâd. The six princes each take an individual journey to their father's city and, seeing coins and dinars on the ground, each of them fetches them and puts a heap on a basket as a gift to their father. The sultan reacts badly to the presents and locks each of his sons in the dungeons. The titular M'hammed, le fils du sultan, the youngest son, decides to take a similar journey, despite his mother's pleas. He is joined by Saâd; they pass by a kingdom with gold coins lying on the ground and another of gems and diamonds. M'hammed then goes fishing until he empties the sea of the every fish, and a last fish appears to beg him to stop. M'hammed questions the fish about it, and the animal tells it was M'hammed's father's previous wife, changed into a fish by God, and gives him a necklace as proof of her words. M'hammed takes the necklace and goes to his father's city. The boy gives his father the necklace, and the sultan decides to name M'hammed as his successor, but he warns him against freeing his six elder brothers. Time passes, and M'hammed, hearing his mother's pleas, decides to release his brothers, who become angry that their cadet will rule over them. Later, M'hammed takes Saâd with him to the land of ogres, Saâd kills an ogre and takes a palace for his master. M'hammed sends a carrier pigeon to his father, the sultan, and asks him what he can find for his palace. The sultan, spurred by a vizier, tells M'hammed about the fragrant apples that restore the spirit and the soul, the singing bird with a talking wing; the blood of gazelles that waters the apples and on which the singing bird feeds; and a maiden named Flifla, the daughter of the king of the jinns.

Author Pinchas Sadeh published a Jewish-Tunisian tale titled The Nightingale and the Shroud Wearers. In this tale, a king passes by the house of a widow and her three daughters, and overhears their conversation: the elder wants to marry the king and sew him new clothes "like the good old ones", the middle one that she will cook him a meal in the same manner, and the youngest promises to be a good wife and mother. The king sends for each of them the next day, and asks each of them about their boasts: the elder two dismiss their words, but the youngest answers truthfully. The king marries her, to the elder sisters' jealousy, and the new queen becomes pregnant. Her sisters bribe a midwife to get rid of the babies as soon as they are born (in three consecutive pregnancies), replace them for little animals, while they leave the babies on a poor woman's doorstep. After the third pregnancy, the king feels betrayed by the queen and banishes her from the palace. Back to the children, the poor old woman raises them, two boys and a girl, and the queen's sisters realize they are alive, so they come to the old woman house with a plan: they pretend to be wanderers and compliment the house in front of the girl, but suggest her elder brothers build her a pool and bring a nightingale to sing her sweet songs. After the aunts depart, the girl asks her brothers to build her the pool - which they do - and find her the nightingale. The elder brother offers to go on the journey, meets an old man on the way, who advises hi, when he reaches a fenced garden, to get the bird in a cage and run back without listening to the voices around him. He tries and fails; many men wearing shrouds gang up on him and cast him in a pit, along with other prisoners. When it is the middle brother's turn, he arrives at the garden, gets the bird and escapes to the garden's entrance, guarded by a tall man. The youth, sword in hand, threatens the guard and makes him promise to release his elder brother and the other prisoners. Now safely back home with the bird, the king passes by their house and admires the girl's beauty, and asks her to marry him. They set a date for their wedding, and the nightingale begins to shame the wedding couple, for they are father and daughter. Moved by the bird's words, the king summons the midwife and learns the truth of their ploy, but discovers the queen took her own life.

==== Tell Atlas ====
In a variant collected in the Tell Atlas area from an informant from Tafoughalt, titled Los hermanos de los mechones de oro ("The Siblings with Golden Locks"), a rich man listens to three women talking near the fountain: the first wants to marry him and promises to weave a burnoose with the wool of a single sheep; the second claims she can prepare a meal for the whole village with a single sheep's thigh, and the third promises to bear him twins with golden locks. The man marries all three women; the first two fail in their boasts and the third gives birth to twins, a girl and a boy. The other two take the twins and abandon them in the woods. An old woman passes by the woods and rescues the twins. They grow up and the male twin marries a woman, while the female twin spends her days at home. The jealous women send an old lady to the twins' house to convince them to seek the milk of a lioness, brought in the hide of its cub; the water that flows where the mountains meet; and the singing bird from the golden house of the tejniud (a fairy woman).

==== Sudan ====
In a Sudanese variant published by S. Hillelson, The Talking Parrot, a sister, with the ability to make rain fall when she cries, to produce pearls and coral when she laughs, is convinced by an old woman to send her brother to seek a talking parrot.

Authors Ahmed Al-Shahi and F. C. T. Moore collected a Sudanese tale from a Ja'alyin source with the title How Wad al-Nimair - shame upon him - married his daughter. In this tale, a man has seven wives and brings in an eighth one to live with him. The eighth wife gives birth to a girl, but the co-wives take her and put a broom in her place. The next year, she gives birth to twin boys, al-Hassan and al-Husain, who are replaced by stones and cast in the river. The three children are swallowed by a big fish, but, when the river dries up, they exit the fish's belly and make their way to a village, where they build a house for themselves. While the girl takes care of babies and sweeps, the brothers play with the boys of the village. One day, the girl finds a pot of gold, which she later shows her brothers when they are old enough. Years later, some women of the village convince the brothers to steal Wad al-Nimair's golden hen with its chicks. They succeed, but Wad al-Nimair is warned of the crime and imprisons the twin brothers. The same women prick a thorn in their sister's head and she becomes a turtle-dove. In this form, she flies next to her brothers' cell and asks about their situation: the first time, they are crying, and the turtle-dove cries with them, summoning rain; the second time, they are lying on silk, and the little bird laughs, producing coins from her mouth. The third time, Wad al-Nimair finds the bird and plucks the thorn from her head, turning her back into Path-of-the-Flood (the girl's name). Struck at her beauty, he decides to marry her and releases her twin brothers. On the wedding day, another turtle-dove perches on a tree before them, and sings about Wad al-Nimair is marrying his own daughter. His suspicions aroused by the bird's words, Wad al-Nimair inquires al-Hassan and al-Husain, who confirm the story. Wad al-Nimair then beheads his seven co-wives, reinstates his eighth wife and welcomes Path-of-the-Flood, al-Hassan and al-Husain as his children.

==== Libya ====
In a Judeo-Tripolitanian Arabic tale collected from an informant in Tripoli, Libya, and translated as The Sultan and three sisters, a sultan has no children, and convinces his minister to disguise themselves and mingle with the people. They wander the streets at night until they see a light in the distance, in a house by the desert. They approach it and overhear three sisters talking: the eldest wants to marry the sultan's doughnut maker; the middle one his cook, and the youngest the sultan himself, for she promises to bear him three children, two boys and a girl in consecutive years. The next day, the sultan sends for them and they each marry their husbands of choice. The elder two begin to nurture jealousy towards their cadette. When the she gives birth to her children in three consecutive years, each time they bribe a midwife to get rid of the babies and replace them for puppies. The children survive and make their way into the world. Years later, one of their aunts pays them a visit and convinces the sister to seek a "shirt that sings whose sleeves respond to it", then, for the bird which sings and whose wings respond to it.

== See also ==
- The Bird from the Land of Gabour
- The Golden Bird (Berber folktale)
