= Selma Feldbach =

Estonian medical scientist (1878–1924)

Selma Feldbach (May 5, 1878 – April 2, 1924) was the first Estonian woman to become a medical doctor. In 1904, she graduated in medicine from the University of Bern.

In 1908, Feldbach was appointed as an acting assistant in operative surgery at the University of Tartu and worked in the surgical office of the outpatient clinic of the private university of Tartu. From 1914 to 1923, Feldbach also worked at the Mellin Clinic.
