= Mária Bellová =

Slovak medical doctor

Mária Bellová (10 November 1885 – 20 November 1973) was a Slovak medical doctor.

== Life and career ==
Bellová was born on 10 November 1885 in Liptovský Svätý Peter. She became a medical doctor in 1910 and is known as the first-ever Slovak female medical doctor. She focused primarily on the treatment of childhood tuberculosis.
