= Lidia Gertrudis Sogandares =

Panamanian physician

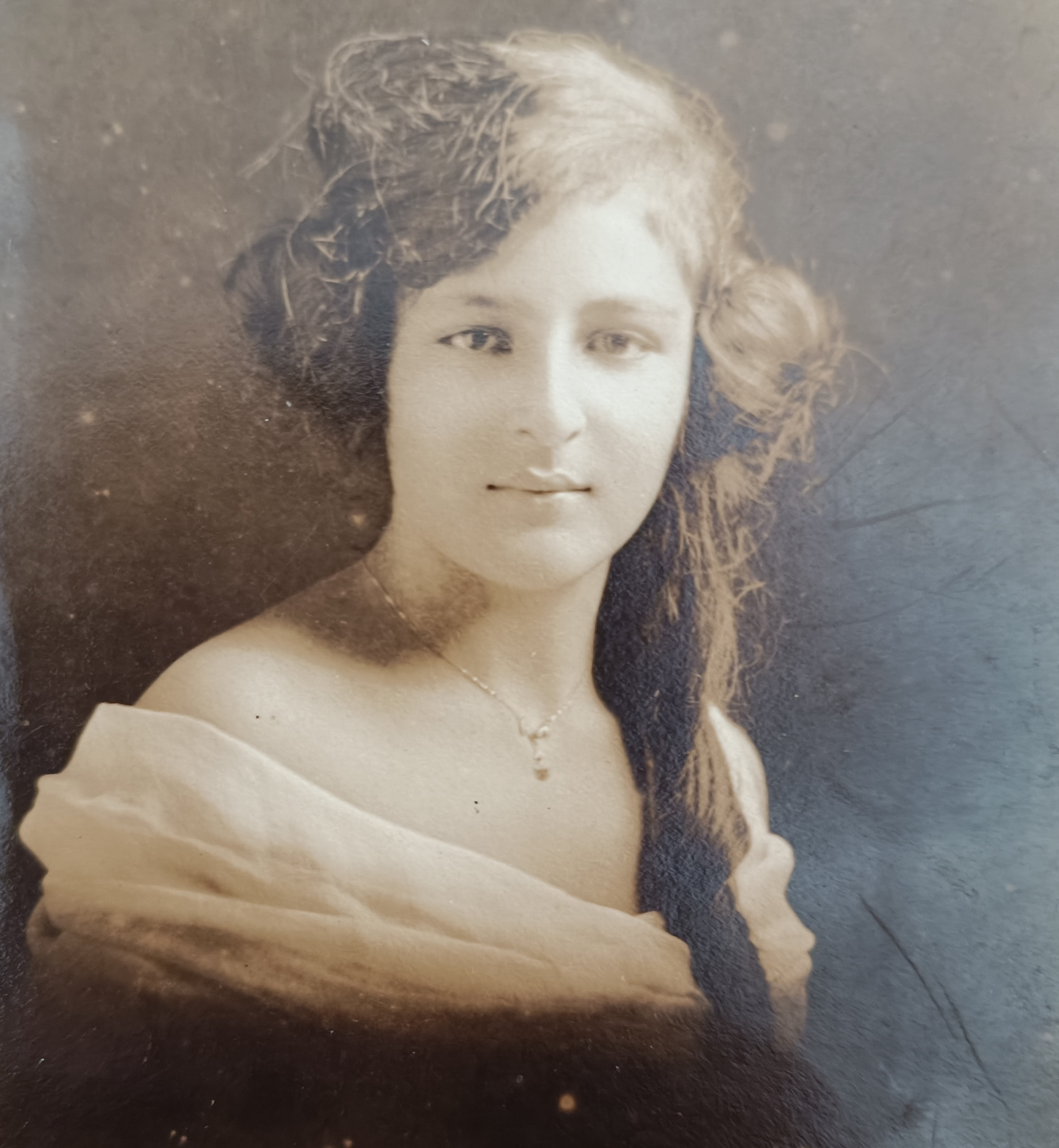
Image of Lidia Gertrudis Sogandares

Lidia Gertrudis Sogandares (1908-1971), was a Panamanian physician.

She became the first indigenous female physician in Panama in 1934.

== Personal life ==
Lidia Sogandares was born on October 17, 1908, on an island called Taboga in Panama. She grew up in a big family with four brothers and a younger sister. When she was a kid, her dad got a job with a company in Panama City, so they all moved there.

== Achievement ==
Sogandares was one of the co-founders and the inaugural female member of the Panamanian Academy of Medicine and Surgery. She also co-founded and served as the first president of the Panamanian Society of Obstetrics and Gynecology. Additionally, she held memberships in the Pan-American Alliance of Medical Women, the Isthmian Medical Association of the Canal Zone, and the Women's Medical Association.
