= Aldjia Noureddine Benallègue =

Algerian physician and pediatrician (1919–2015)

Aldjia Noureddine Benallègue (1919-2015), was an Algerian pediatrician. She is the first female doctor in Algeria and the first female professor of pediatrics after the independence of Algeria.
