= Henriette Bùi Quang Chiêu =

Vietnamese physician (1906-2012)

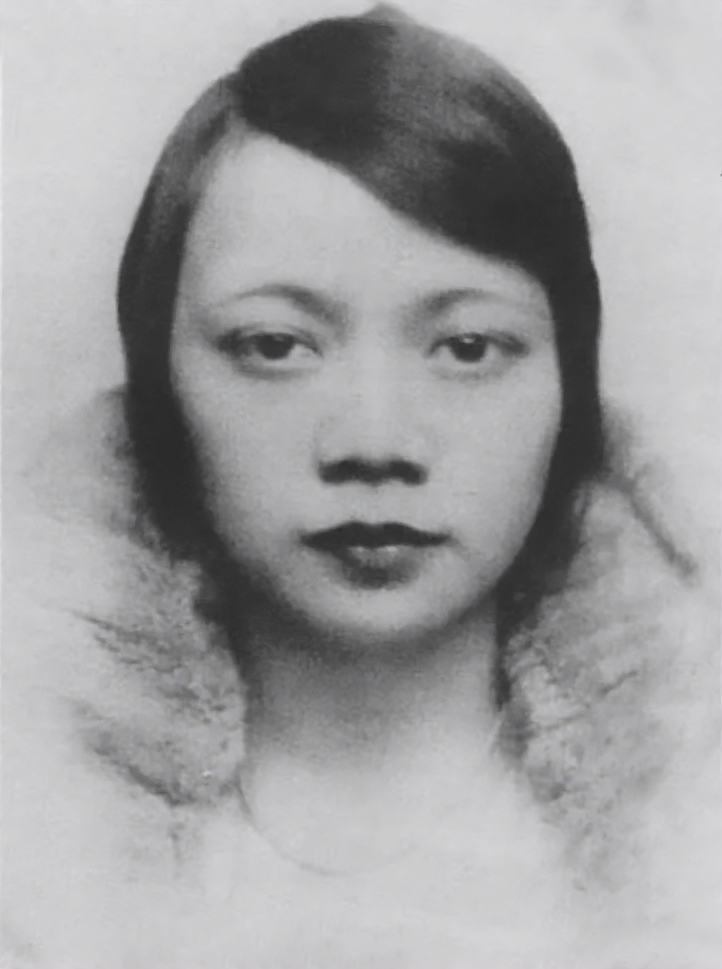
Bùi Quang Chiêu in 1931

Henriette Bùi Quang Chiêu (1906–2012) was the first female medical doctor in Vietnam. She went to medical school in France, and graduated there in 1934. She opposed French colonialism in Vietnam. She was pressured into an arranged marriage by her father in 1935, but later divorced. She later married again. She went to Japan in the 1950s to study acupuncture.

== Early life ==
Bui was born as Henriette Bùi Quang Chiêu in Southern Vietnam, Tonkin, Vietnam. Bui was the daughter of a wealthy French family in Cochinchina, Vietnam. Bui's father was Bui Quang Chieu, a politician in Cochinchina during the French colonial period who was killed by the Việt Minh. At the age of 15, Bui studied abroad in France for a year before taking a year hiatus due to illness. Bui attended the University of Paris in 1927 in honor of her brother, Louis Bui Quang Chieu, who was a physician in Saigon, Vietnam and also a Paris University graduate.

== Education ==
Quang Chiêu, a Vietnamese woman, was seen as an anomaly attending a professional school in France. Her attendance was thought of as a breakthrough for French education at the time. She studied at Paris University for seven years before graduating in 1934. Her school thesis was commended and awarded medals. After graduating, Quang Chiêu returned to Vietnam in 1935 where she was appointed to head of the Department of Midwifery at Cho Lon Hospital.

== Personal life ==
After returning home, Quang Chiêu was betrothed to Vuong Quang Nhuong, who was a respected lawyer in both Vietnam and France. Quang Chiêu's eventual marriage was thought to be very successful considering her and her spouses level of education and job status, but Quang Chiêu was very reluctant at first. After being pressured by her father and family Quang Chiêu married in 1935. She later divorced her husband due to her devotion to medicine. In 1957 she went to Japan to study acupuncture and then returned home and developed a research direction with many effective applications for obstetrics.
