= Anna Tomaszewicz-Dobrska =

Polish doctor

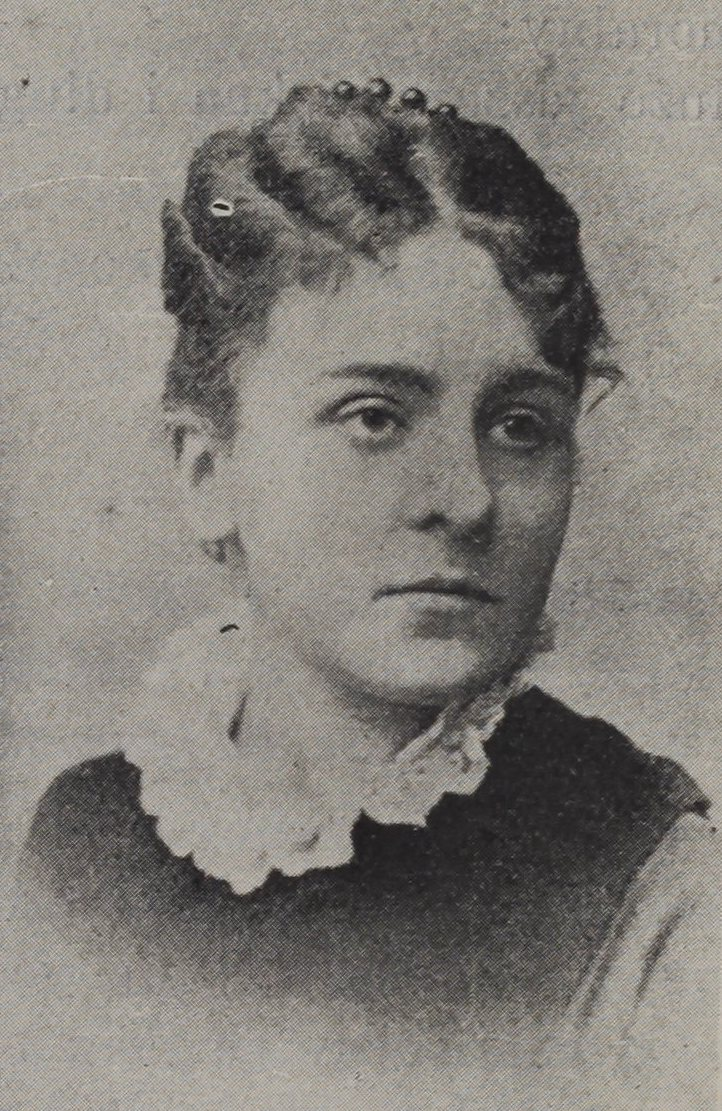
- Born: 1854; Mława, Poland
- Died: 1918 (aged 63–64); Warsaw, Poland
- Occupation: Physician

Anna Tomaszewicz-Dobrska (1854–1918) was a Polish physician. She was the second Polish woman to become a medical doctor, and the first female Polish medical doctor to practice in Poland. She obtained her medical degree in 1877 in Zürich.

== Biography ==
Anna Tomaszewicz-Dobrska was born in 1854 in Mława. During her fifth year of study in Zürich, she worked as an assistant to Professor Edward Hitzig (a German neurologist and psychiatrist) in the Institute for the Mentally Ill.

After obtaining her medical degree, she worked in Berlin and Vienna for a short time. However, she was not allowed to pass the state exam, which would have given her the right to practice medicine in Poland, and she was refused as a member of the Polish Society of Medicine because she was a woman.

She moved to St. Petersburg and passed the state exam there. This allowed her to practice women's health and pediatric medicine within the Polish Kingdom and Russia. In 1882, an epidemic of infection during childbirth broke out in Warsaw, and a few maternity shelters were opened; shelter number 2 (on Prosta Street) was given to Anna to lead, and she led it until 1911. In 1896, she became the first to perform a Caesarean section in Warsaw.

She was also one of the founders of the Society of Polish Culture.
