= Zulfiya Umidova =

Uzbekistani physician

- Born: Zulfiya Ibragimovna Umidova; 1897; Tashkent, Sirdayro Region, Russian Empire
- Died: 16 April 1980 (aged 82–83)
- Citizenship: Russian Empire, USSR
- Education: National University of Uzbekistan
- Alma mater: Central Asian State University
- Scientific career
- Fields: cardiology
- Institutions: Tashkent Medical Academy
- Academic advisors: Alexander Nikolaevich Kryukov
- Notable students: Rafail Alexandrovich Katsenovich

Zulfiya Ibragimovna Umidova (Russian: Зульфия Ибрагимовна Умидова; 1897, (Note: Most sources say she was born in 1897, but her obituary in Pravda Vostoka said she was born in 1896.) Tashkent — 16 April 1980), was a Soviet cardiologist and a corresponding member of the Academy of Medical Sciences of the USSR (1948).

== Biography ==
She was born on June 1, 1897, in Tashkent. She graduated with honors from the Tashkent Women's Gymnasium, passed her maturity exams at a real school, and enrolled in the Petrograd Women's Medical Institute, where she studied until April 1918. From 1918 to 1920, she worked at the 159th Evacuation Hospital of the People's Commissariat of Turkestan in Tashkent, and from 1920 to 1922, she worked as an instructor for the People's Commissariat of Health.

In 1922, she graduated from the Medical Faculty of the Central Asian State University (National University of Uzbekistan) and subsequently worked as a hospital therapeutic clinic intern. From 1926 to 1930, she served as an intern at the 2nd City Hospital.

In 1930, she returned to the Tashkent Medical Institute, where she held the position of an assistant and later an associate professor at the hospital therapeutic clinic (1937–1944). From 1945 to 1969, she headed the department and the hospital therapeutic clinic.

In 1937, for her scientific work, she was awarded the degree of Candidate of Medical Sciences.

In 1946, she defended her doctoral dissertation on the topic: "The Cardiovascular System of a Healthy Person and the Features of the Clinical Presentation of Myocardial Infarction and Other Forms of Coronary Insufficiency in a Hot Climate".

In 1948, she was elected a corresponding member of the Academy of Medical Sciences. From 1970 to 1975, she worked as a professor-consultant at the hospital therapeutic clinic. For many years, she was the chief consultant of the Main Fourth Directorate of the Ministry of Health of the Republic.

In 1945, she was awarded the title of Honored Doctor of the Uzbek SSR, and later, she became a Distinguished Scientist and Technologist of Uzbekistan. She was elected as a deputy to the Tashkent City Council three times (1961, 1965, 1967) and was a deputy of the Supreme Council of Karakalpakstan in 1951. She participated in the congresses of democratic women in Budapest (1946) and Helsinki (1951) and was part of a delegation to India (1952). She died on 16 April 1980.

== Works ==
She was a specialist in the fields of physiology and cardiology. Her initial works in cardiology, both as a sole author and in collaboration with Professors G.F. Mankus and I.A. Kassirsky, dedicated to the electrocardiographic study of malaria and avitaminosis.

Subsequently, together with her colleagues from her department, she addressed questions related to the physiology and pathology of the cardiovascular system in a hot climate. Under her direct supervision, biochemical studies were conducted. The first epidemiological surveys in Andijan were conducted under her guidance, studying the prevalence of ischemic heart disease and arterial hypertension in two major regions of Tashkent. She researched the clinical presentation of acute myocardial infarction, atherosclerosis, and hypertension, as well as the role of prior acclimatization and adaptation mechanisms, rheumatism, and acquired heart defects (she described early signs of rheumatic myocarditis). In the 1970s, she studied the impact of a hot climate as a constant environmental factor on the cardiovascular system.

She worked on equipping the clinic with advanced equipment and implementing informative diagnostic and treatment methods into practice, including the systematic use of the Italian phonocardiograph "Galileo," tests with dosed physical exertion (cycle ergometry, Master's test), and pharmacological tests with nitroglycerin and obzidan. She also studied the external respiratory system and the oxygen therapy room, equipped with oxygen tents and a centralized oxygen supply.

She authored 80 scientific works, including three monographs: "Issues in Climatophysiology" (1939), "Physiology and Pathology of the Cardiovascular System in a Hot Climate" (1949), and "Essays on Cardiology in a Hot Climate" (1975). Under her guidance, 32 doctoral dissertations and 3 doctoral theses were defended. She actively collaborated with the "Znanie" society, delivering lectures in both Uzbek and Russian.

She led the therapeutic and cardiological scientific societies of the republic, served as the editor of the "Cardiology" section of the Great Medical Encyclopedia (3rd edition), was a board member of cardiology and therapeutic societies, and a member of the editorial boards of the "Cardiology" and "Therapeutic Archive" journals, as well as the International Association of Therapists.

== Awards ==
- Two Order of the Red Banner of Labour
- Honored Scientist and Technologist of the Uzbek SSR (1950)
- Honored Doctor of the Uzbek SSR (1945)
