= Marija Vecrumba =

Latvian physician (1885–1919)

Marija Vecrumba (7 March 1885 – 18 March 1919) was a Latvian physician. She trained in medicine at the University of Bern in Switzerland. She was a participant in the women's emancipation movement, and was appointed the head of the public health department of the Executive Committee of the Council of Workers' Deputies (Iskolat) in Jelgava district. She was shot on 18 March 1919, when German Landeswehr units occupied Jelgava.

== Life ==
Marija Vecrumba was born on 7 August 1885 in Riga into the family of a railwayman.

Vecrumba studied at the Lomonosov Women's Gymnasium and worked as a teacher for a short time. Medical education for women in Latvia at that time was "almost impossible", but she was encouraged to pursue her education outside Russia by the activities of other participants in the women's emancipation movement, such as Dora Stučka. In 1904 Vecrumba travelled to Switzerland to study medicine. In 1911 she graduated from the University of Bern, and from 1912 to 1915 she worked as a doctor in Jelgava. She specialised in obstetrics and gynecology.

Vecrumba was one of the first Latvian doctors, the first academically educated Latvian doctor and the first female doctor in Jelgava. In 1915 she became a refugee, and from 1915 to 1918, she worked in Valka. On 31 January 1919, she was appointed head of the public health department of the Jelgava County Council of Workers' Deputies (Iskolata). On 15 March 1919 when German Landeswehr units occupied Jelgava, she provided aid to wounded Soviet Latvian Army soldiers. Vecrumba was arrested, and on 18 March 1919, she was shot without a thorough investigation, along with wounded soldiers of the Soviet Latvian Army, in a medical train at Jelgava station. She is buried in Riga, at Torņakalns Cemetery.
