= May Ratnayake =

Sri Lankan physician

May Ratnayeke
- Born: May de Livera; 1892; Kandy, Sri Lanka
- Died: 1988 (aged 95–96)
- Education: Ceylon Medical College (MD)
- Known for: First female Sri Lankan doctor

May Ratnayeke (1892–1988) was a Sri Lankan physician, is known for being the second female medical student from that country and its first female doctor.

== Life ==
Dr. Ratnayeke was born May de Livera to John de Livera, one of six siblings, in Kandy. In her childhood, she attended local schools, then went on to medical school at Ceylon Medical College in Colombo. She graduated with her MD in 1916. After obtaining her degree, she worked at the American Mission Hospital in Jaffna, then moved to Lady Havelock Hospital. She was a fellow at the Royal Free Hospital for Women from 1925 to 1927. Dr Ratnayeke was married in 1927 and had three children, a son and a daughter who became physicians, and a son who became a tea planter. In 1927 she became a surgeon at Lady Havelock Hospital. She was a fellow at the University of Edinburgh Medical School for a year from 1932 to 1933. After her fellowship, she was promoted to chief surgeon, and joined the faculty at the medical school of the University of Ceylon. In the 1930s Dr Ratnayeke contributed articles on gynaecological issues to a number of international journals.

In 1943 she was elected President of the Ceylon Branch of the British Medical Association. For most of her career, she was part of the Medical Women's International Association.

== Works ==
- 'A Case of Acquired Artresia of the Vagina and its cure by Plastic Operation', International Journal of Obstetrics & Gynaecology, August 1934.
- 'A Case of Vesico-Vaginal Fistula resulting from Simple Ulceration of a Prolapse in an Old Woman', British Journal of Obstetrics & Gynaecology, August 1934.
- 'Umbilical fistula caused by a patent meckel's diverticulum', British Journal of Surgery, October 1936.
