= Vandan-Ishiin Ichinkhorloo =

Mongolian physician

Vandan-Ishiin Ichinkhorloo was a Mongolian physician.

She became one of the first five female physicians of Mongolia in 1947.

On 5 October 1942, the first State University was opened in People's Republic of Mongolia by the Ministry of Health, and in 1947, the first students graduated from its Medical Faculty. Five of the nine graduates were women, among them Vandan-Ishiin Ichinkhorloo.

Vandan-Ishiin Ichinkhorloo was appointed a professor of surgery in the Medical Faculty of the university in 1956 and as such became the first female professor in Mongolia. In 1958 she was inducted in the Academy of Sciences of Mongolia.
