= Maria Baltaga-Savițki =

First female doctor from Bessarabia, physician, and educator

Maria Baltaga-Savițki (1854 – 1904) was a physician from the Bessarabia Governorate of the Russian Empire.

She became the first female physician in what is now Moldova in 1879. She studied medicine in the University of Zürich in 1874.
