= Mary de Sousa =

Indian-Kenyan doctor

Mary Mathilda de Sousa, née Pereira (1890–1953) was an Indian-Kenyan doctor. She was the first Asian female doctor in Kenya, practicing from 1919.

== Life ==
Mary Mathilda Pereira was raised in Mazagon, Bombay, one of fourteen children of Peter Paul Pereira. She graduated from Grant Medical College in 1914 as a Licentiate in Medicine and Surgery. She worked as a medical officer in the Bhavnagar district and Chhota Udaipur district before returning to Bombay to work at the Kerrawala Maternity Hospital. In 1919 attended the Lahore session of the Indian National Congress.

After marrying Dr Alex Caetano Lactancio de Sousa in 1919, she moved to Nairobi with him. There she worked as a doctor and midwife. After the Lady Grigg Welfare League was formed in 1926, de Sousa successfully fundraised to build a maternity hospital, the Lady Grigg Indian Maternity Home, for Indian women. She and her husband refused a place on the board of governors, since the hospital's constitution did not provide for balanced representation of Indians and Europeans on the committee. She was also involved in the Indian Education Board, and in the Girl Guides and Boy Scouts.

Mary de Sousa hosted important Indian visitors in her house, such as Sarojini Naidu, who led the East African Indian National Congress twice. In the mid-1940s she became ill, and was mostly confined to her house for the last decade of her life.

== Personal life ==
Mary Pereira married a fellow medical doctor, Alexio Caetano Lactancio de Sousa, in 1919. He survived her when she died in Nairobi in 1953, aged 63 years. They had three children, Theo, Peter, and Aura; their son Peter A. de Sousa became a doctor like his parents.
