= Claudie Fayein =

French-Yemeni medical doctor and ethnologist

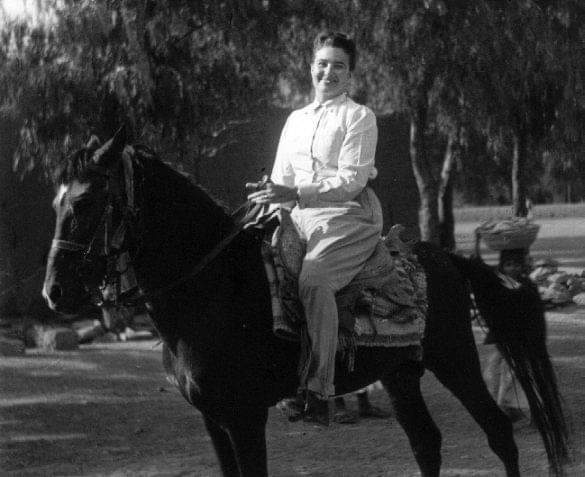
- Fayein in 1951
- Born: 1912; Paris, France
- Died: 4 January 2002 (aged 89–90); Paris, France

Claudie Fayein (born in Paris in 1912 – 4 January 2002) was a French-Yemeni medical doctor and ethnologist. She was Yemen's first female physician.

== Personal life ==
Claudie had worked in Yemen and connected her life with the country since the 1950s.

In 1950 Imam Ahmad bin Yahya hired Claudie for 6 months in Sana'a in order to take care of his wives. She was then almost 40 years old. She stayed a year longer, working at Sana's hospitals until 1952, She made many trips to Yemen, where she became a famous person. She participated in establishing National Museum in Sana'a in 1970. In 1990 Yemeni president Ali Abdullah Saleh granted her the Yemeni citizenship.

Memoirs of Al Hakima were popular in Poland (original title "A French Doctor in the Yemen", Polish editions 1957, 1959, 1967, translated by Julia Matuszewska, series Naokoło świat, English translation 1957).

== Her books ==
She has also written several books on the country.

- A French Doctor in the Yemen. The book was translated into Arabic (كنت طبيبة في اليمن) by former Yemeni prime minister Mohsin al-Aini and published in Beirut in 1960.
- Yemen
- Vies de femmes au Yémen (French edition). The book was translated into Arabic (حياة النساء في اليمن) by Bashir Zandal.

== Death ==
Claudie died in Paris on 4 January 2002.
