= Françoise Legey =

French-Moroccan medical doctor

Françoise Legey (18 July 1876 – 28 November 1935) was a French-Moroccan medical doctor.

She became the first female physician in Morocco in 1900. She devoted her career in Algeria and Morocco to women's healthcare. She established a maternity hospital in Marrakesh and educated midwives, and a milk dispensary.

She published two books on Moroccan folklore. Légey established in Marrakesh.
