= Sofya Khafizovna Khakimova =

Tajikistani physician (1924–2015)

Sofya Khafizovna Khakimova (20 December 1924 – 12 October 2015) was a Tajikistani physician. She became the first female physician in Tajikistan in 1943. She was the first Tajikistani female surgeon, the first Tajikistani woman to become doctor of medical science and the only woman doctor in Central Asia to become a member of the USSR Academy of Medical Sciences.

Khakimova was born in a working-class family. She studied at the newly founded Stalinabad Medical School from 1939 and graduated in 1943. In the 1950s, she studied in Moscow, and took a doctor's degree in medicine in 1958. In the 1960s, she worked for family planning in Tajikistan. She founded the Research Institute for the protection of Mothers and Children in the Ministry of Health of Tajik SSR, and was its president from 1980 to 1993. She published her memoirs in 1998. Khakimova died on 12 October 2015, at the age of 90.
