= Laura Martínez de Carvajal =

Cuban physician

- Born: August 27, 1869; Havana, Cuba
- Died: January 24, 1941 (aged 71); Cotorro, Havana, Cuba
- Education: University of Havana
- Medical career
- Field: Ophthalmology

Laura Martínez de Carvajal (1869–1941) was the first female doctor in Cuba. She was the oldest daughter of a rich Spanish family, and learned to read and write at age four and finished high school at age thirteen. Because she was a woman, when she studied medicine she was not able to dissect corpses at the same time as her male classmates, but had to do so by herself on Saturday and Sunday. She graduated in medicine at age 19 in 1889, at the University of Havana. She also married in July 1889. She worked as an ophthalmologist; her husband, Dr. Enrique López Veitía, also worked as such and she became his chief assistant and cared for his patients when he could not. She also collaborated with him on many papers and three volumes of "Clinical Ophthalmology". She had seven children. Her husband died of tuberculosis in 1910 and she died of tuberculosis in 1941.

== Early life and education ==
=== Childhood ===
Laura Martínez de Carvajal was born on 27 August 1869 in Havana, Cuba. She was the oldest daughter of a wealthy Spanish family whose social status brought about connections which enabled her parents to provide a good education to her and her siblings. She was taught the social codes of high society while being reminded of always valuing human values. Her family also made sure to give to others by starting with the people living in their neighborhood. She distinguished herself very earlier on for being a precocious child. At the age of 4 she could read and write, and at the age of 10 enrolled into high school.

=== Education ===
She enrolled in the College of San Francisco de Paula, Cuba, where she earned her bachelor and graduated at the age of 13. One year later, after insisting that she should study alongside her brother, her father enrolled her into the University of Havana, in the faculty of physical-mathematical sciences and medicine. Laura out-shadowed her all male peers. The professors who taught physiology and dissection at the San Felipe and Santiago Hospital in Havana, Cuba, did not allow her to dissect with her peers because women were conventionally excluded from taking part in such activity. As an alternative, she worked on her own on the weekends which turned out to be an advantage. She graduated as medical on 15 January 1889 and became the first female physician and ophthalmologist of Cuba.

=== Personal ===
Her father insisted that she finished school before getting married. She married Cuban ophthalmologist Dr. Enrique López Veitía (well known ophthalmologist and initiator of the Medical Congresses in Cuba) on 20 January 1889, 5 days after graduating. Together, they had 7 children which she cared for all while practicing her profession.

== Career ==
She started practicing in a medical clinic, Policlínica de Especialidades, which she funded with her husband. She contributed in the preparation of her husbands manual Oftalmologia clinica which appeared in three volumes in 1891, 1895 and 1906. Her other collaborations included in Notas fisiológicas, and Ocular leprosy.

== End of Life ==
Near the end of her life she funded a public school for the kids who lived in her residence. Laura Martínez de Carvajal died at the age of 75 on January 24, 1941, in the municipal of San Pedro del Cotorro, Havana, Cuba from tuberculosis.
