= Women in medicine =

Women licensed to practice medicine

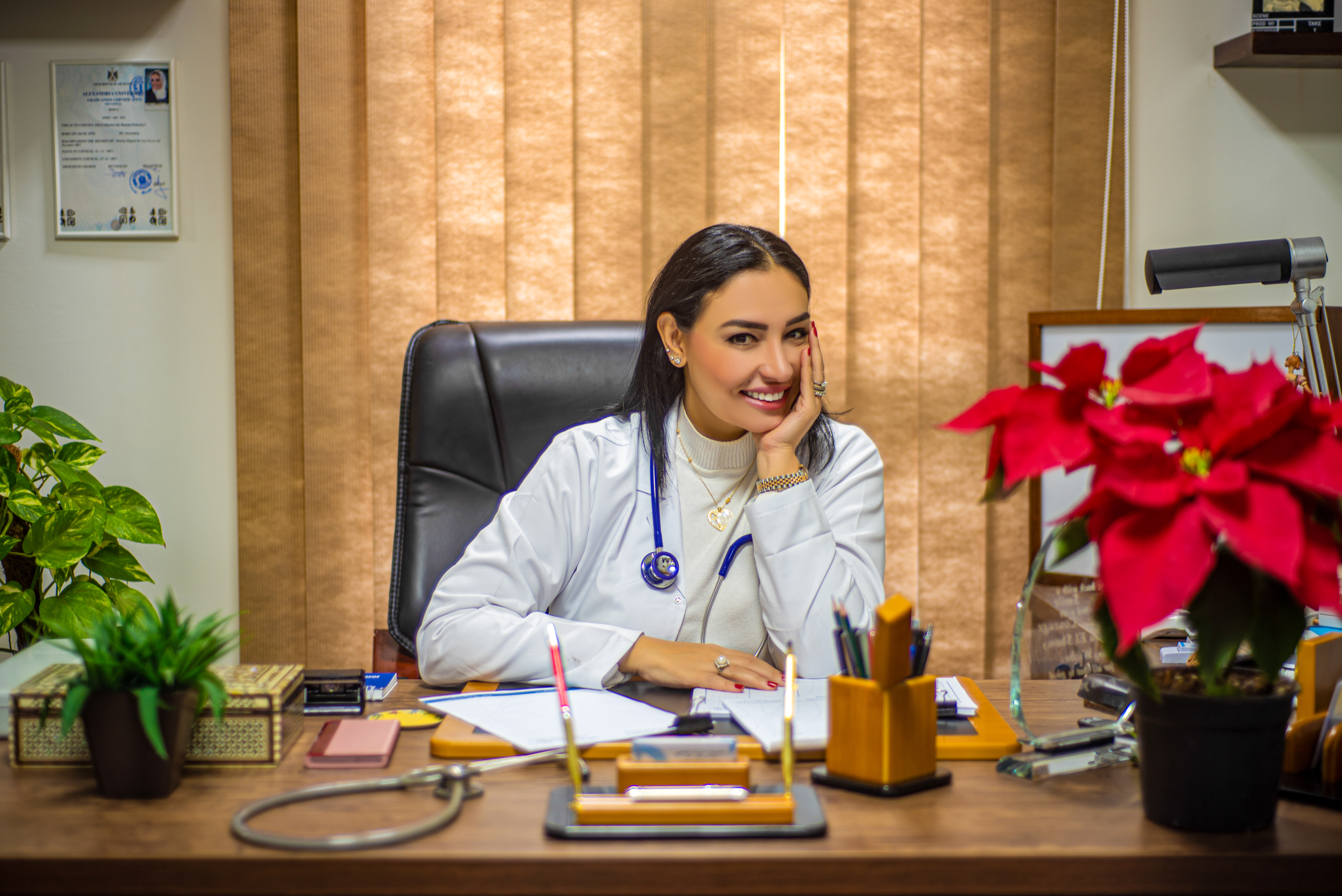
A woman doctor at her desk in a hospital in Egypt. Though women still face challenges in fully participating in medical professions, women are increasingly getting recognition and inclusion in medicine around the world.

The presence of women in medicine, particularly in the practicing fields of surgery and as physicians, has been traced to the earliest of history. Women have historically had lower participation levels in medical fields compared to men with occupancy rates varying by race, socioeconomic status, and geography.

Women's informal practice of medicine in roles such as caregivers, or as allied health professionals, has been widespread. Since the start of the 20th century, most countries of the world provide women with access to medical education. Not all countries ensure equal employment opportunities, and gender equality has yet to be achieved within medical specialties and around the world.

== History ==
=== Ancient medicine ===
The involvement of women in the field of medicine has been recorded in several early civilizations. An Egyptian of the Old Kingdom of Egypt, Peseshet, described in an inscription as "lady overseer of the female physicians", is the earliest woman named in the history of science. Ubartum lived around 2050 BC in Mesopotamia and came from a family of several physicians. Agamede was cited by Homer as a healer in ancient Greece before the Trojan War. Metrodora was a physician and generally regarded as the first female medical writer. Her book, On the Diseases and Cures of Women, was the oldest medical book written by a female and was referenced by many other female physicians. She credited much of her writings to the ideologies of Hippocrates.

=== Medieval Europe ===
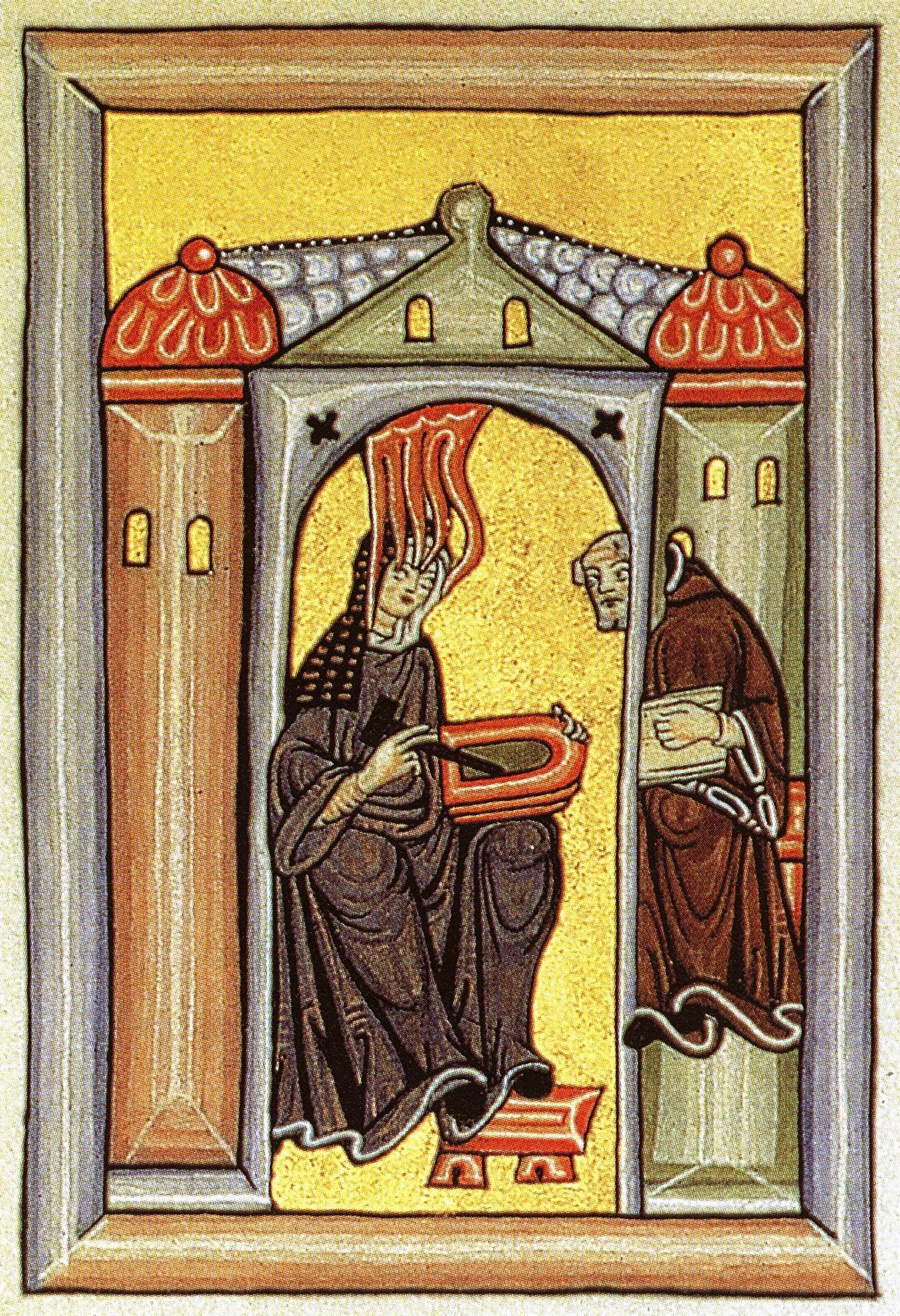
Hildegard of Bingen, a Medieval German abbess who wrote Causae et Curae, 1175.

During the Middle Ages, convents were a centralized place of education for women, and some of these communities provided opportunities for women to contribute to scholarly research. An example is the German abbess Hildegard of Bingen, whose prolific writings include treatments of various scientific subjects, including medicine, botany and natural history (c. 1151–58). She is considered Germany's first female physician.

Women in the Middle Ages participated in healing techniques and several capacities in medicine and medical education. Women occupied select ranks of medical personnel during the period. They worked as herbalists, midwives, surgeons, barber-surgeons, nurses, and traditional empirics. Women healers treated most patients, not limiting themselves to treating solely women. The names of 24 women described as surgeons in Naples, Italy between 1273 and 1410 have been recorded, and references have been found to 15 women practitioners, most of them Jewish and none described as midwives, in Frankfurt, Germany between 1387 and 1497. The earliest known English women doctors, Solicita and Matilda Ford, date to the late twelfth century; they were referred to as medica, a term for trained physicians.

Women also engaged in midwifery and healing arts without having their activities recorded in written records, and practiced in rural areas or where there was little access to medical care. Society in the Middle Ages limited women's role as physician. Once universities established faculties of medicine during the thirteenth century, women were excluded from advanced medical education. Licensure began to require clerical vows for which women were ineligible, and healing as a profession became male-dominated.

On many occasions, women had to fight against accusations of illegal practice done by males, putting into question their motives. If they were not accused of malpractice, then women were considered "witches" by both clerical and civil authorities. Surgeons and barber-surgeons were often organized into guilds, which could hold out longer against the pressures of licensure. Like other guilds, a number of the barber-surgeon guilds allowed the daughters and wives of their members to take up membership in the guild, generally after the man's death. Katherine "la surgiene" of London, daughter of Thomas the surgeon and sister of William the Surgeon, belonged to a guild in 1286. Documentation of female members in the guilds of Lincoln, Norwich, Dublin and York continues until late in the period.

Midwives, those who assisted pregnant women through childbirth and some aftercare, included only women. Midwives constituted roughly one third of female medical practitioners. Men did not involve themselves in women's medical care; women did not involve themselves in men's health care. The southern Italian coastal town of Salerno was a center of medical education and practice in the 12th century. In Salerno, the physician Trota of Salerno compiled a number of her medical practices in several written collections. One work on women's medicine that was associated with her, the De curis mulierum ('On Treatments for Women') formed the core of what came to be known as the Trotula ensemble, a compendium of three texts that circulated throughout medieval Europe. Trota herself gained a reputation that spread as far as France and England. There are also references in the writings of other Salernitan physicians to the mulieres Salernitane ('Salernitan women'), which give some idea of local empirical practices.

Dorotea Bucca, an Italian physician, was chair of philosophy and medicine at the University of Bologna for over forty years from 1390. Other Italian women whose contributions in medicine have been recorded include Abella, Jacqueline Felice de Almania, Alessandra Giliani, Rebecca de Guarna, Margarita, Mercuriade (14th century), Constance Calenda, Clarice di Durisio (15th century), Constanza, Maria Incarnata and Thomasia de Mattio.

=== Medieval Islamic world ===
For the medieval Islamic world, little information is known about female medical practitioners although it is likely that women were regularly involved in medical practice in some capacity. Male medical writers refer to the presence of female practitioners (a ṭabība) in describing certain procedures or situations. The late-10th to early-11th century Andalusi physician and surgeon al-Zahrawi wrote that certain medical procedures were difficult for male doctors practicing on female patients because of the need to touch the genitalia. The male practitioner was required to either find a female doctor who could perform the procedure, or a eunuch physician, or a midwife who took instruction from the male surgeon. The existence of female practitioners can be inferred, albeit not explicitly, through direct evidence. Midwives played a prominent role in the delivery of women's healthcare. For these practitioners, there is more detailed information, both in terms of the prestige of their craft (ibn Khaldun calls it a noble craft, "something necessary in civilization") and in terms of biographical information on historic women. To date, no known medical treatise written by a woman in the medieval Islamic world has been identified.

=== Western medicine in China ===
Traditional Chinese medicine based on the use of herbal medicine, acupuncture, massage and other forms of therapy has been practiced in China for thousands of years. Western medicine was introduced to China in the 19th century, mainly by medical missionaries sent from various Christian mission organizations, such as the London Missionary Society (Britain), the Methodist Church (Britain) and the Presbyterian Church (US). Benjamin Hobson (1816–1873), a medical missionary sent by the London Missionary Society in 1839, set up the Wai Ai Clinic (惠愛醫館) in Guangzhou, China. The Hong Kong College of Medicine for Chinese (香港華人西醫書院) was founded in 1887 by the London Missionary Society, with its first graduate (in 1892) being Sun Yat-sen (孫中山).

Due to the social custom that men and women should not be near to one another, Chinese women were reluctant to be treated by Western male doctors. This resulted in a need for female doctors. One of these was Sigourney Trask of the Methodist Episcopal Church, who set-up a hospital in Fuzhou during the mid-19th century. Trask also arranged for a local girl, Hü King Eng, to study medicine at Ohio Wesleyan Female College, with the intention that Hü would return to practise western medicine in Fuzhou. After graduation, Hü became the resident physician at Fuzhou's Woolston Memorial Hospital in 1899 and trained several female physicians. Another female medical missionary Mary H. Fulton (1854–1927) was sent by the Foreign Missions Board of the Presbyterian Church (US) to found the first medical college for women in China. Known as the Hackett Medical College for Women (夏葛女子醫學院), this college was located in Guangzhou, China, and was enabled by a large donation from Edward A. K. Hackett (1851–1916) of Indiana. The college was dedicated in 1902 and offered a four-year curriculum. By 1915, there were more than 60 students, mostly in residence. Most students became Christians, due to the influence of Fulton. The college was aimed at the spreading of Christianity and modern medicine and the elevation of Chinese women's social status. The graduates of this college included Chau Lee-sun (周理信, 1890–1979) and Wong Yuen-hing (黃婉卿), both of whom graduated in the late 1910s and then practiced medicine in the hospitals in Guangdong province.

== Midwifery in 18th-century America ==
During this era, the majority of American women whether European or African American, childbirth was considered a female event where female friends, relatives, and the local midwife gathered to support the birthing mother. Midwives gained their knowledge through experience and apprenticeship. Out of the different occupations women took on around this time, midwifery was one of the highest-paying industries. In the 18th century, households tended to have an abundance of children largely in part to having hired help and diminished mortality rates. Despite the high chance of complications in labor, American midwife Martha Ballard, specifically, had high success rates in delivering healthy babies to healthy mothers.

== Women's health movement, 1970s ==
The 1970s marked an increase of women entering and graduating from medical school in the United States. From 1930 to 1970, a period of 40 years, around 14,000 women graduated from medical school. From 1970 to 1980, a period of 10 years, over 20,000 women graduated from medical school. This increase of women in the medical field was due to both political and cultural changes. Two laws in the U.S. lifted restrictions for women in the medical field – Title IX of the Higher Education Act Amendments of 1972 and the Public Health Service Act of 1975, banning discrimination on grounds of gender. In November 1970, the Assembly of the Association of American Medical Colleges rallied for equal rights in the medical field.

Throughout the decade women's ideas about themselves and their relation to the medical field were shifting due to the women's feminist movement. A sharp increase of women in the medical field led to developments in doctor-patient relationships, changes in terminology and theory. One area of medical practice that was challenged and changed was gynecology. Author Wendy Kline noted that "to ensure that young brides were ready for the wedding night, [doctors] used the pelvic exam as a form of sex instruction."

With higher numbers of women enrolled in medical school, medical practices like gynecology were challenged and subsequently altered. In 1972, the University of Iowa Medical School instituted a new training program for pelvic and breast examinations. Students would act both as the doctor and the patient, allowing each student to understand the procedure and create a more gentle, respectful examination. With changes in ideologies and practices throughout the 70s, by 1980 over 75 schools had adopted this new method.

Along with women entering the medical field and feminist rights movement, came along the women's health movement which sought alternative methods of health care for women. This came through the creation of self-help books, most notably Our Bodies, Ourselves: A Book by and for Women. This book gave women a "manual" to help understand their body. It challenged hospital treatment, and doctors' practices. Aside from self-help books, many help centres were opened: birth centres run by midwives, safe abortion centres, and classes for educating women on their bodies, all with the aim of providing non-judgmental care for women. The women's health movement, along with women involved in the medical field, opened the doors for research and awareness for female illness like breast cancer and cervical cancer.

Scholars in the history of medicine had developed some study of women in the field—biographies of pioneering women physicians were common prior to the 1960s—and study of women in medicine took particular root with the advent of the women's movement in the 1960s, and in conjunction with the women's health movement.

== Modern medicine ==
Doctors of the Women's Hospital Corps operating on a patient during World War I. Flora Murray and Louisa Anderson went on to found the Endell Street Military Hospital in 1915, which was staffed substantially by sufragettes and treated some 26,000 wounded soldiers during its existence.

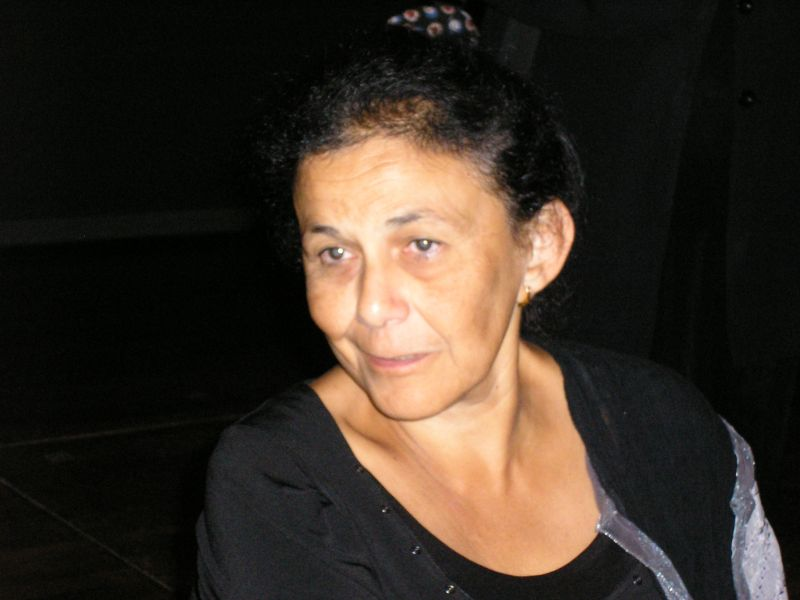
Wafaa El-Sadr, Egyptian epidemiologist and MacArthur Fellow, 2010.

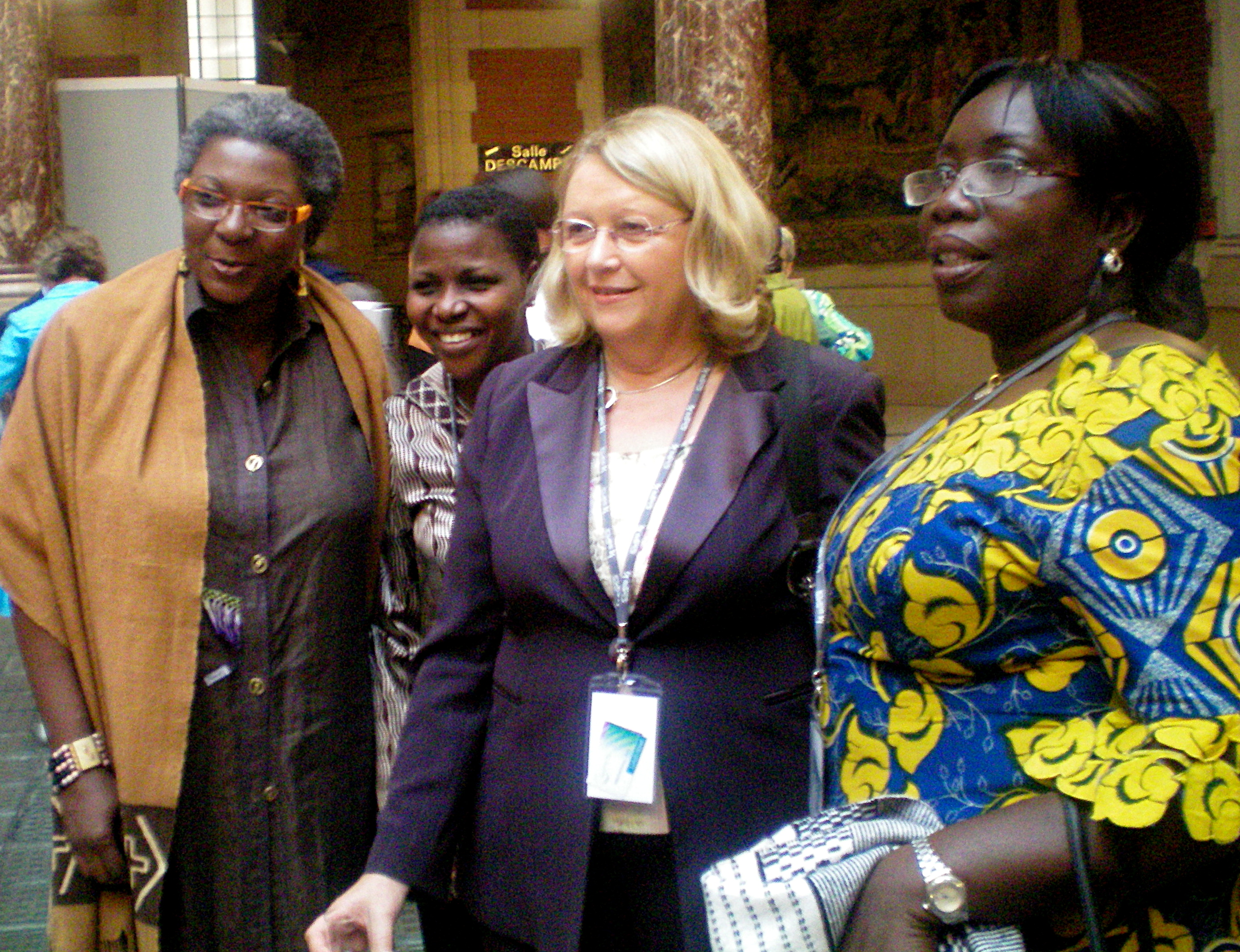
Monique Frize (centre), Canadian academic and biomedical engineer, 2008.

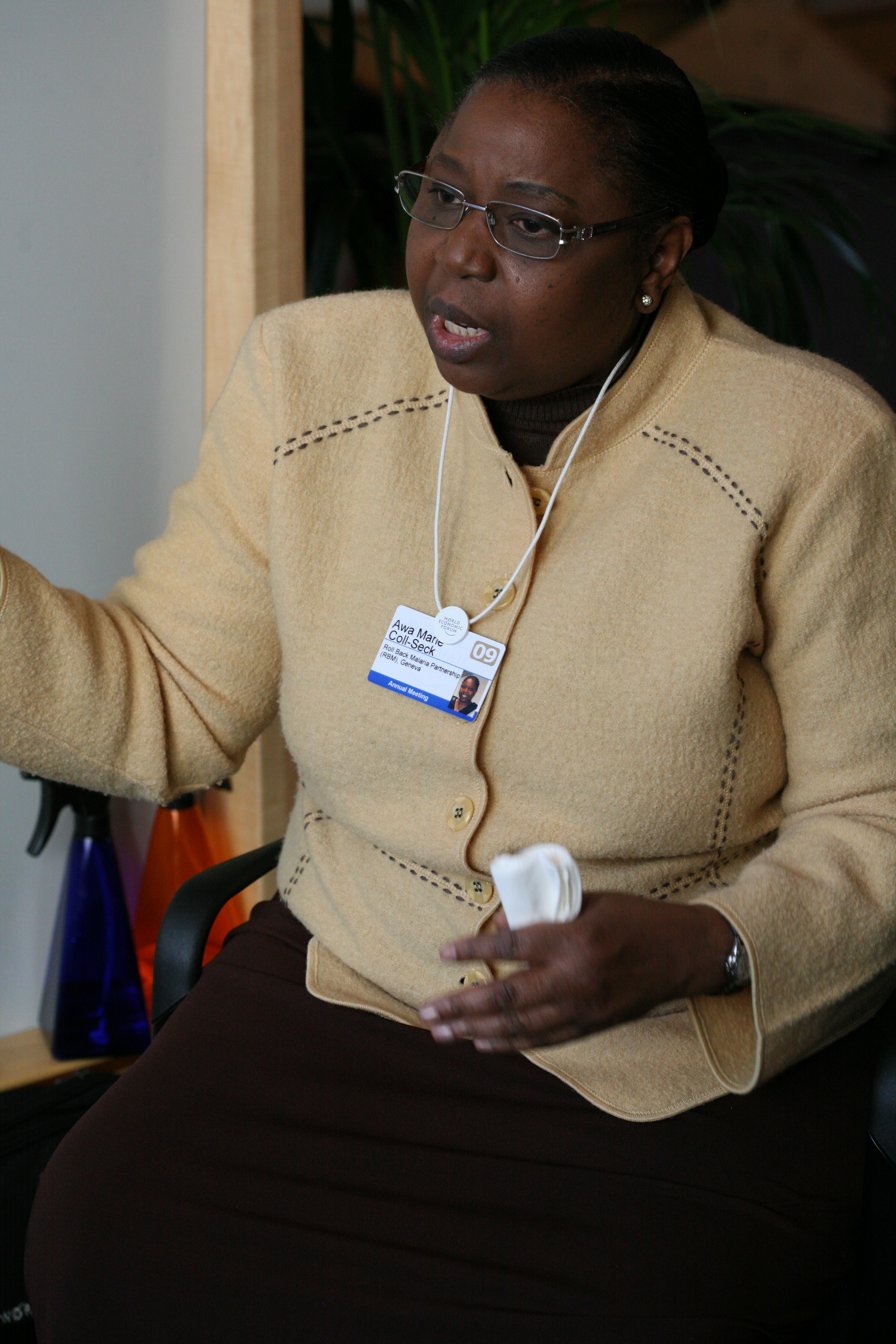
Awa Marie Coll-Seck, Senegal's former Minister of Health, in 2009.

In 1540, Henry VIII of England granted the charter for the Company of Barber-Surgeons; while this led to the specialization of healthcare professions (i.e. surgeons and barbers), women were barred from professional practice. Women did continue to practice during this time without formal training or recognition in England and eventually North America for the next several centuries.

Women's participation in the medical professions was generally limited by legal and social practices during the decades while medicine was professionalizing. Women openly practiced medicine in the allied health professions (nursing, midwifery, etc.), and throughout the nineteenth and twentieth centuries, women made significant gains in access to medical education and medical work through much of the world. These gains were sometimes tempered by setbacks; some have documented a decline in women physicians in the US in the first half of the twentieth century, such that there were fewer women physicians in 1950 than there were in 1900. A 2026 study attributed this decline to closures of schools with traditionally high female enrollments, higher admission standards for female applicants to medical schools than male applicants, and the refusal of some medical schools, such as Harvard Medical School, to admit women at all.

Through the latter half of the twentieth century, women made gains generally across the board. In the United States, for instance, women were 9% of total US medical school enrollment in 1969; this had increased to 20% in 1976. By 1985, women constituted 16% of practicing American physicians.

At the beginning of the 21st century in industrialized nations, women have made significant gains, but have yet to achieve parity throughout the medical profession. Women have achieved parity in medical school in some industrialized countries, since 2003 forming the majority of the United States medical school applicants. In 2007–2008, women accounted for 49% of medical school applicants and 48.3% of those accepted. According to the Association of American Medical Colleges (AAMC) 48.4% (8,396) of medical degrees awarded in the US in 2010–2011 were earned by women, an increase from 26.8% in 1982–1983. While more women are taking part in the medical field, a 2013–2014 study reported that there are significantly fewer women in leadership positions within the academic realm of medicine. This study found that women accounted for 16% of deans, 21% of the professors, and 38% of faculty, as compared to their male counterparts.

The practice of medicine remains disproportionately male overall. In industrialized nations, the recent parity in gender of medical students has not yet trickled into parity in practice. In many developing nations, neither medical school nor practice approach gender parity. Moreover, there are skews within the medical profession: some medical specialties, such as surgery, are significantly male-dominated, while other specialties are significantly female-dominated, or are becoming so. For example, in the United States, As of 2006 female physicians outnumber male physicians in pediatrics and female residents outnumber male residents in family medicine, obstetrics and gynecology, pathology, and psychiatry. In several different areas of medicine (general practice, medical specialties, surgical specialties) and in various roles, medical professionals tend to overestimate women's true representation, and this correlates with a decreased willingness to support gender-based initiatives among men, impeding further progress towards gender parity.

Women continue to dominate in nursing. In 2000, 94.6% of registered nurses in the United States were women. In health care professions as a whole in the US, women numbered approximately 14.8 million, as of 2011.

Biomedical research and academic medical professions—i.e., faculty at medical schools—are also disproportionately male. Research on this issue, called the "leaky pipeline" by the National Institutes of Health and other researchers, shows that while women have achieved parity with men in entering graduate school, a variety of discrimination causes them to drop out at each stage in the academic pipeline: graduate school, postdoc, faculty positions, achieving tenure; and, ultimately, in receiving recognition for groundbreaking work.

=== Glass ceiling ===
The "glass ceiling" is a metaphor to convey the undefined obstacles that women and minorities face in the workplace. Female physicians of the late 19th-century faced discrimination in many forms due to the prevailing Victorian era attitude that the ideal woman be demure, display a gentle demeanor, act submissively, and enjoy a perceived form of power that should be exercised over and from within the home. Medical degrees were difficult for women to earn, and once practicing, discrimination from landlords for medical offices, left female physicians to set up their practices on "Scab Row" or "bachelor's apartments."

The Journal of Women's Health surveyed physician mothers and their physician daughters to analyze the effect that discrimination and harassment have on the individual and their career. This study included 84% of physician mothers that graduated medical school prior to 1970, with the majority of these physicians graduating in the 1950s and 1960s. The authors of this study stated that discrimination in the medical field persisted after the title VII discrimination legislation was passed in 1965. This was the case until 1970, when the National Organization for Women (NOW) filed a class action lawsuit against all medical schools in the United States. By 1975, the number of women in medicine had nearly tripled, and has continued to grow. By 2005, more than 25% of physicians and around 50% of medical school students were women. The increase of women in medicine also came with an increase of women identifying as a racial/ethnic minority, yet this population is still largely underrepresented in comparison to the general population of the medical field.

Within this specific study, 22% of physician mothers and 24% of physician daughters identified themselves as being an ethnic minority. These women reported experiencing instances of exclusion from career opportunities as a result of their race and gender. According to this article, females tend to have lessened confidence in their abilities as a doctor, yet their performance is equivalent to that of their male counterparts. This study also commented on the impact of power dynamics within medical school, which is established as a hierarchy that ultimately shapes the educational experience. Instances of sexual harassment attribute to the high attrition rates of females in the STEM fields.

== Competition between midwifery and obstetrics ==
A shift from women midwifery to male obstetrics occurs in the growth of medical practices such as the founding of the American Medical Association. Instead of assisting labor on the basis of an emergency, doctors took over the delivery of babies completely; putting midwifery second. This is an example of the growing sense of competition between male physicians and female midwives as a rise in obstetrics took hold. The education of women on the basis of midwifery was stunted by both physicians and public-health reformers, driving midwifery to be seen as out of practice. Societal roles also played a fact in the downfall of the practice in midwifery because women were unable to obtain the education needed for licensing and once married, women were to embrace a domestic lifestyle. In 2018, there were 11,826 certified nurse midwives (CNMs). In 2019 there were 42,720 active physicians in Obstetrics and Gynecology.

Outside of the United States, midwifery is still practiced in several countries such as in Africa. The first school of midwives in Africa was supposedly founded by Dr. Ernst Rodenwalt in Togo in 1912. In comparison, The Juba College of Nursing and Midwifery in South Sudan (a country that gained its independence in 2011) graduated its first class of students in 2013.

== Women's contributions to medicine ==
=== Historical women's medical schools ===
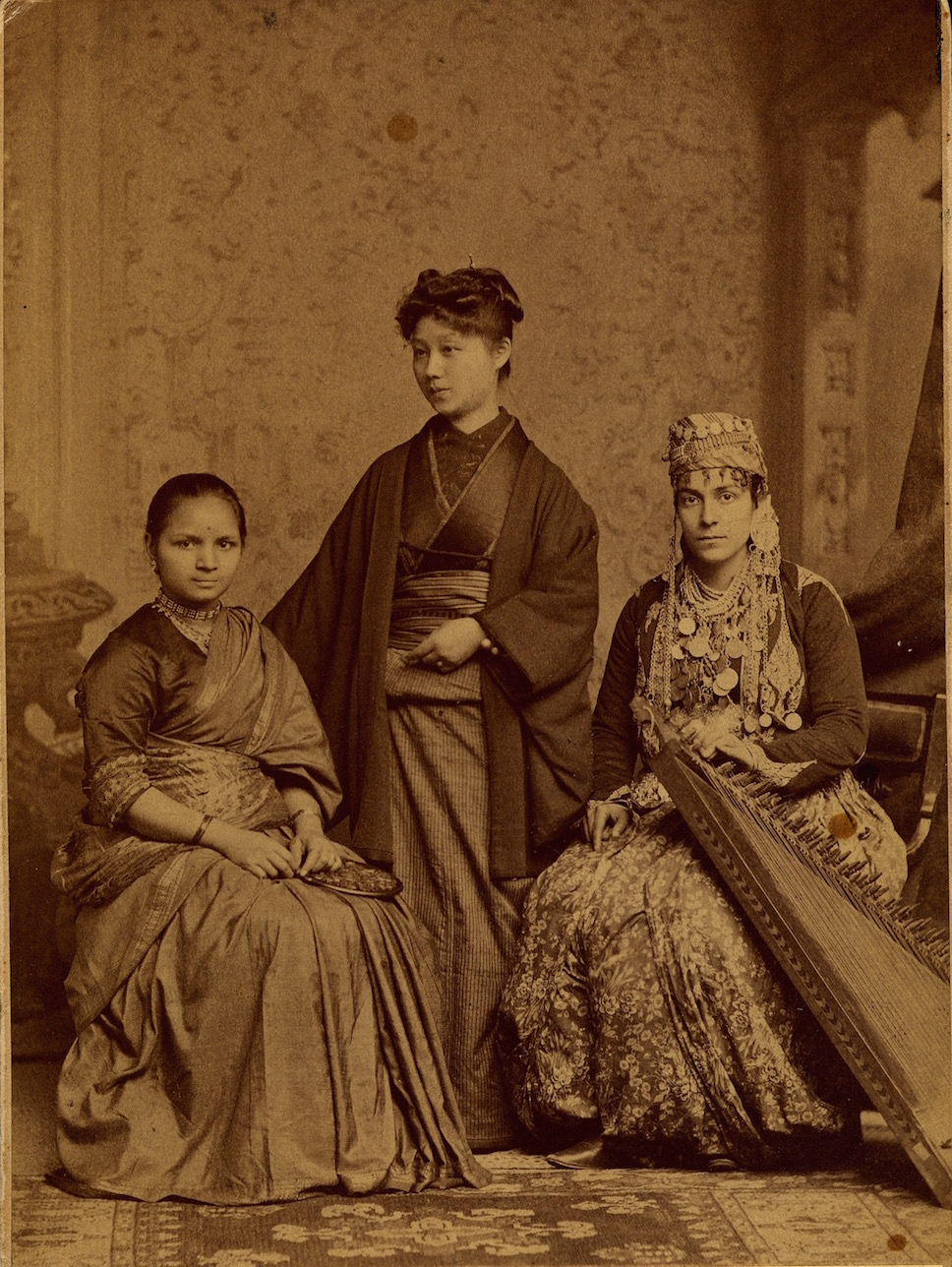
Woman's Medical College of Pennsylvania in 1886: Anandibai Joshi, a Marathi Hindu from India (left) with Kei Okami, a Christian from Japan (center) and Sabat Islambooly, a Kurdish-Jewish woman from Syria (right). All three completed their medical studies and each of them was the first woman from their respective countries to obtain a degree in Western medicine.

When women were routinely forbidden from medical school, they sought to form their own medical schools.

- New England Female Medical College, Boston, founded in 1848.
- Woman's Medical College of Pennsylvania (founded 1850 as Female Medical College of Pennsylvania)
- London School of Medicine for Women (founded 1874 by Sophia Jex-Blake)
- Edinburgh School of Medicine for Women (founded 1886 by Sophia Jex-Blake)
- First Pavlov State Medical University of St. Petersburg (founded 1897 as Female Medical University)
- Tokyo Women's Medical University (founded 1900 by Yoshioka Yayoi)
- Hackett Medical College for Women, Guangzhou, China, founded in 1902 by Presbyterian Church (USA).

=== Historical hospitals with significant female involvement ===
- Woman's Hospital of Philadelphia, founded in 1861, provided clinical experience for Woman's Medical College of Pennsylvania students
- New England Hospital for Women and Children (now called Dimock Community Health Center), founded in 1862 by women doctors "for the exclusive use of women and children"
- New Hospital for Women (founded in the 1870s by Elizabeth Garrett Anderson and run largely by women, for women)
- South London Hospital for Women and Children (founded 1912 by Eleanor Davies-Colley and Maud Chadburn; closed 1984; employed an all-woman staff)

=== Pioneering women in early modern medicine ===
==== 18th century ====
- Madeleine-Françoise Calais (c. 1713 – fl. 1740) was a pioneer who is referred to as the first female dentist in France.
- Dorothea Erxleben (1715–1762) was the first female doctor in Germany and the first woman worldwide to be granted an MD by a university.
- Salomée Halpir (1718 – after 1763) was a Polish medic and oculist who is often referred to as the first female doctor from the Grand Duchy of Lithuania.

==== 19th century ====
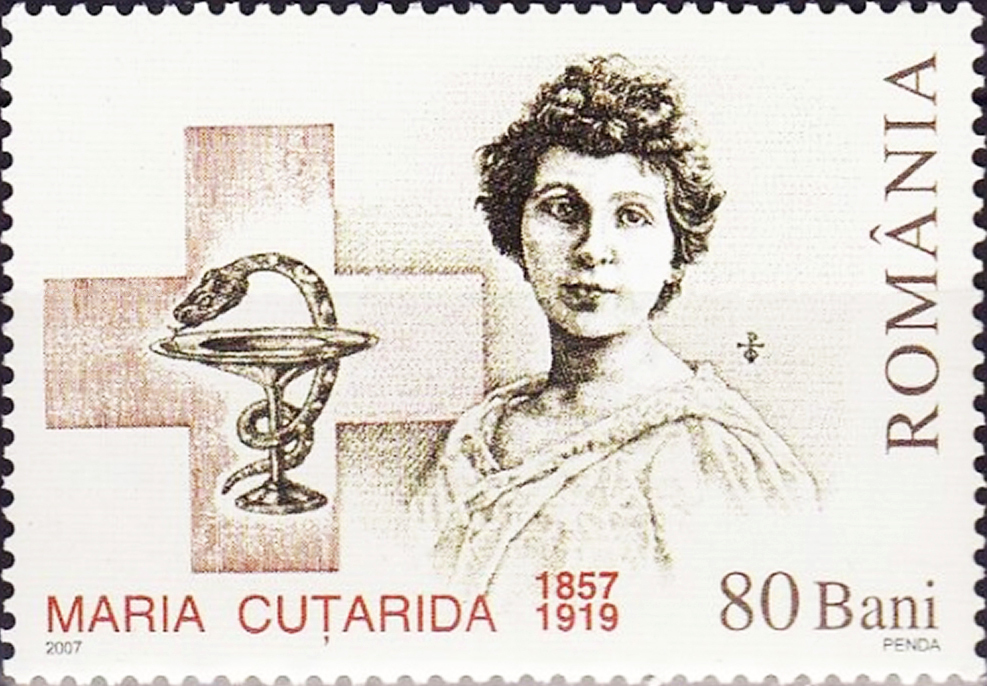
Maria Cuțarida-Crătunescu, the first female doctor in Romania, 1857–1919. Stamp of Romania, 2007.

- Lovisa Årberg (1801–1881) was the first female doctor and surgeon in Sweden; whereas, Amalia Assur (1803–1889) was the first female dentist in Sweden and possibly Europe.
- Marie Durocher (1809–1893) was a Brazilian obstetrician, midwife and physician. She is considered the first female doctor in Brazil and the Americas.
- Ann Preston (1813–1872) was the first female to become the dean of a medical school [Woman's Medical College of Pennsylvania (WMCP)] in 1866.
- Elizabeth Blackwell (1821–1910), who was England-born, was the first woman to graduate from medical school in the United States. She obtained her MD in 1849 from Geneva College, New York City.
- Rebecca Lee Crumpler, (1831–1895) became the first African American female physician in the United States in 1864 upon being awarded her M.D. by New England Female Medical College in Boston.
- Lucy Hobbs Taylor (1833–1910) was the first female dentist in the United States.
- Elizabeth Garrett Anderson (1836–1917) was a pioneering feminist in Britain who became the first female doctor in the United Kingdom in 1865 and a co-founder of London School of Medicine for Women.

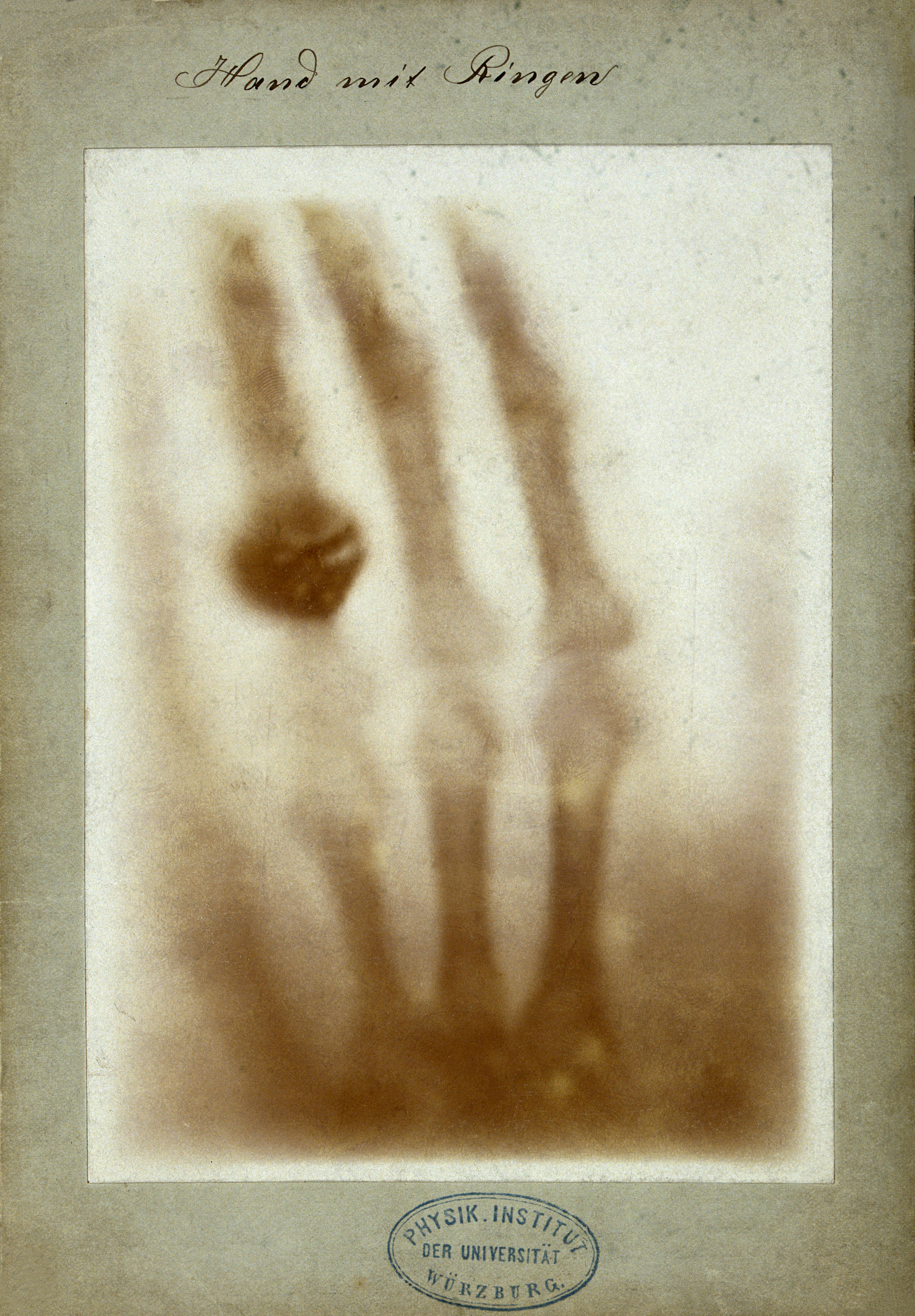
Hand mit Ringen (Hand with Rings): the first medical X-ray by Wilhelm Röntgen of his wife, Bertha's left hand.

- Anna Bertha Röntgen (1839–1919) was the subject of the very first human X-ray image in 1895 by her husband Wilhelm Röntgen.
- Madeleine Brès (1839–1925) was the first female medical doctor in France.
- Sophia Jex-Blake (1840–1912) was an English physician, feminist and teacher who was the first woman to practice medicine in Scotland in 1878.
- Sophia Bambridge (1841–1910) was the first female doctor in American Samoa.
- Frances Hoggan (1843–1927) became the first female doctor in Wales in 1870. She was also the first British woman to receive a doctorate in medicine (1870).
- Eliza Walker Dunbar (1845-1925) was the first woman in the UK to be appointed as a House Surgeon with responsibilities over male doctors (1874) and the first to receive a UK medical licence by examination (1877).
- Jennie Kidd Trout (1841–1921) was the first woman in Canada to become a licensed medical doctor in March 1875.
- Rosina Heikel (1842–1929) was a feminist and the first female physician in Finland (1878), as well as in the Nordic countries.
- Isala Van Diest (7 May 1842 – 6 February 1916) was the first female medical doctor and the first female university graduate in Belgium.
- Nadezhda Suslova (1843–1918), a graduate of Zurich University, was the first female doctor in Russia
- Edith Pechey-Phipson (1845–1908) was a pioneering English doctor in India. She received her MD in 1877 from the University of Bern and Licentiate in Midwifery in 1877 at the Royal College of Physicians of Ireland.
- Mary Scharlieb (1845–1930) was a pioneer British female physician, as she was the first woman to be elected to the honorary visiting staff of a hospital in the United Kingdom.
- Vilma Hugonnai (1847–1922) was the first female doctor in Hungary. She studied medicine in Zürich and received her degree in 1879. However, she had to work as a midwife until 1897 when the Hungarian authorities finally accepted her degree. Hugonnai then started her own medical practice.
- Margaret Cleaves (1848–1917) was a pioneering doctor in brachytherapy who obtained her M.D. in 1873. She was the first female appointed to the University of Iowa Medical Department's examining committee in 1885.
- Anastasia Golovina, also known as Anastassya Nikolau Berladsky-Golovina, and Atanasya Golovina (1850–1933), was the first female doctor in Bulgaria.
- Ogino Ginko (1851–1913) was the first licensed and practicing female physician of Western medicine in Japan.
- Bohuslava Kecková (1854–1911), first Bohemian (Czech) woman to obtain a medical degree in 1880 from University of Zurich.
- Aletta Jacobs (1854–1929) was the first woman to complete a university course in the Netherlands and the first female doctor in the country.
- Hope Bridges Adams Lehmann (1855–1916) was the first female general practitioner and gynecologist in Munich, Germany.
- Grace Cadell (1855–1918) and Marion Gilchrist (1864–1952) were the first women to qualify as doctors in Scotland respectively in 1891 and 1894.
- Draga Ljočić-Milošević (1855–1926) was a feminist activist and the first female physician in Serbia. She graduated from Zurich University in 1879
- Henriette Saloz-Joudra (1855–1928) successfully defended a doctoral thesis in cardiology at the University of Geneva in June 1883.
- Ana Galvis Hotz (1855–1934) was the first female doctor in Colombia. She was also the first Colombian woman (and first woman from Latin America) to obtain a medical degree.
- Constance Stone (1856–1902) was the first woman to practice medicine in Australia.
- Dolors Aleu i Riera (1857–1913) was the first female medical doctor in Spain when she started practicing medicine in 1879.
- Maria Cuțarida-Crătunescu (1857–1919) was the first female doctor in Romania.
- Lilian Welsh (1858–1938) was the first woman full professor at Goucher College.
- Sonia Belkind (1858–1943), who was Russian-born, was the first female doctor in Palestine.
- Isabel Cobb (1858–1947), who earned her M.D. in 1892, was Cherokee and the first woman physician in Indian territory. She was also an alumnus of Woman's Medical College of Pennsylvania.
- Matilde Montoya (1859–1939) became the first female physician in Mexico in 1887.
- Kadambini Ganguly (1861–1923) was the first Indian woman to obtain a medical degree in India upon graduating from the Calcutta Medical College in 1886.
- Elsie Inglis (1864–1917), born in India, was a pioneering Scottish doctor and suffragist who obtained her MD at Edinburgh School of Medicine for Women and worked at Rotunda Hospital, Dublin.
- Annie Lowrie Alexander (1864–1929) was the first licensed female physician in the Southern United States
- Emily Charlotte Thomson (1864–1955) was one of the first women admitted to professional medical societies in Scotland and co-founded the Dundee Women's Hospital in 1896.
- Anandi Gopal Joshi (1865–1887), the first Indian woman to obtain a medical degree having graduated from the Woman's Medical College of Pennsylvania in 1886.
- Susan La Flesche Picotte (1865–1915) was the first Native American woman to obtain a medical degree.
- Sofia Okunevska (1865–1926) was the first Ukrainian female doctor.
- Mary Josephine Hannan (1865–1935) was the first Irishwoman to graduate with the following credentials: LRCPI & SI and LM.
- Marie Spångberg Holth (1865–1942) was the first woman doctor in Norway after graduating in medicine from the Royal Frederiks University of Christiania in 1893.
- Anne Walter Fearn (1865–1938) practiced as a medical doctor in Shanghai, China, for almost 40 years.
- Eloísa Díaz (1866–1950) became the first female doctor in Chile upon graduating from the Universidad de Chile on 27 December 1886. She obtained her degree on 3 January 1887.
- Merbai Ardesir Vakil (1868–1941) was an Indian physician and the first Asian woman to graduate from a Scottish university.
- Eva Jellett (1868–1958), first woman to graduate from Trinity College Dublin with a medical degree in 1905.
- Bertha E. Reynolds (1868–1961) was among the first women licensed to practice medicine in Wisconsin (serving the rural communities of Lone Rock and Avoca).
- Emma K. Willits (1869–1965) was believed to be only the third woman to specialize in surgery and the first to head a Department of General Surgery at Children's Hospital in San Francisco, 1921–1934.
- Alice Hamilton (1869–1970) was an American physician, research scientist, and author who is best known as a leading expert in the field of occupational health and a pioneer in the field of industrial toxicology. She was also the first woman appointed to the faculty of Harvard University.
- Vera Gedroitz (1870–1932) was the first female professor of surgery in the world, as well as the first female military surgeon in Russia.
- Maria Montessori (1870–1952), renowned educator and one of the first female medical doctors in Italy.
- Milica Šviglin Čavov (b. unknown, circa 1870s) was the first Croatian female doctor. She graduated from the Medical School in Zürich in 1893, but was not allowed to work in Croatia.
- Florence Sabin (1871–1953) was the first woman elected to the United States National Academy of Sciences.
- Yoshioka Yayoi (1871–1959), one of the first women to gain a medical degree in Japan; founded a medical school for women in 1900.
- Hannah Myrick (1871–1973) had helped to introduce the use of X-rays at the New England Hospital for Women and Children.
- Laura Esther Rodriguez Dulanto (1872–1919) was the first female doctor in Peru upon obtaining her medical degree.
- Marie Equi (1872–1952) was an American doctor and activist for women's access to birth control and abortion.
- Fannie Almara Quain (1874–1950) was the first woman born in North Dakota to earn a doctor of medicine degree.
- Karola Maier Milobar (born 1876) became the first female physician to practice in Croatia in 1906.
- Bertha De Vriese (1877–1958) was the first Belgian woman to obtain a medical degree from Ghent University.
- Selma Feldbach (1878–1924) was the first Estonian woman to become a medical doctor.
- Andrea Evangelina Rodríguez Perozo (1879–1947) was the first female medical school graduate in the Dominican Republic.
- Alice Mary Barry (1880–1955) was a doctor and the first woman nominated fellow of the Royal College of Physicians of Ireland.

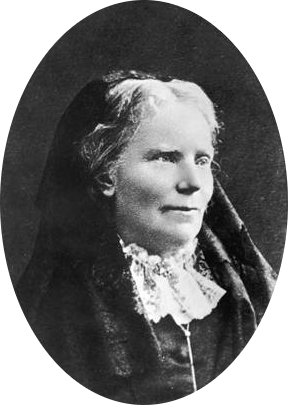
Elizabeth Blackwell, MD, the first woman to graduate from medical school in the United States (1849).

- Ernestina Paper (b. unknown, circa mid–1800s) was the first Italian woman to receive an advanced degree (in medicine) in 1877.
- Doctor Ethel Constance Cousins (1882–1944) and nurse Elizabeth Brodie were the first European women admitted to Bhutan in 1918 as part of a missionary effort to curtail a cholera outbreak.
- Muthulakshmi Reddi (1886–1968) was one of the early female medical doctors in India and a major social reformer.
- María Elisa Rivera Díaz (1887–1981) (1909), Ana Janer (1909), Palmira Gatell (1910), and Dolores Piñero (1892–1975) (1913) were the first women to earn a medical degree in Puerto Rico. María Elisa Rivera Díaz and Ana Janer graduated in the same medical school class in 1909 and thus could both be considered the first female Puerto Rican physicians.
- Anna Petronella van Heerden (1887–1975) was the first Afrikaner woman to qualify as a medical doctor in South Africa. Her thesis, which she obtained a doctorate on in 1923, was the first medical thesis written in Afrikaans.
- Alice Sollier (1861–1942), in 1887 became the first Black French woman to qualify as a medical doctor.
- Matilde Hidalgo (1889–1974) was the first female doctor in Ecuador.
- Johanna Hellman (1889–1982) was a German physician who specialized in surgery, and the first woman to be a member of the German Society for Surgery.
- Sun Chau Lee (周理信, 1890–1979) was one of the first female Chinese doctors of Western medicine in China.
- Mabel Wolff (1890–1981) and her sister Gertrude L. Wolff developed the first midwifery training school in Sudan in 1930. Mastura Khidir, one of the original students, was awarded a medal from King George V in 1945 for being the last surviving midwife from the first graduating class.
- Mary Hearn (1891–1969) was a gynaecologist and first woman fellow of the Royal College of Physicians of Ireland.
- Concepción Palacios Herrera (1893–1981) was the first female physician in Nicaragua.
- Evelyn Totenhofer (1894–1977) became the first (female) resident nurse for Pitcairn Islands in 1944.
- Jane Cummins (1899–1982), who possessed a DMRE and DTM&H, was an officer in the WRAF.
- Irene Condachi (1899–1970), who earned her M.D. in 1927, was one of only two practicing female doctors in Malta during World War II.
- Ah-hsin Tsai (1899–1990) was colonial Taiwan's first female physician.

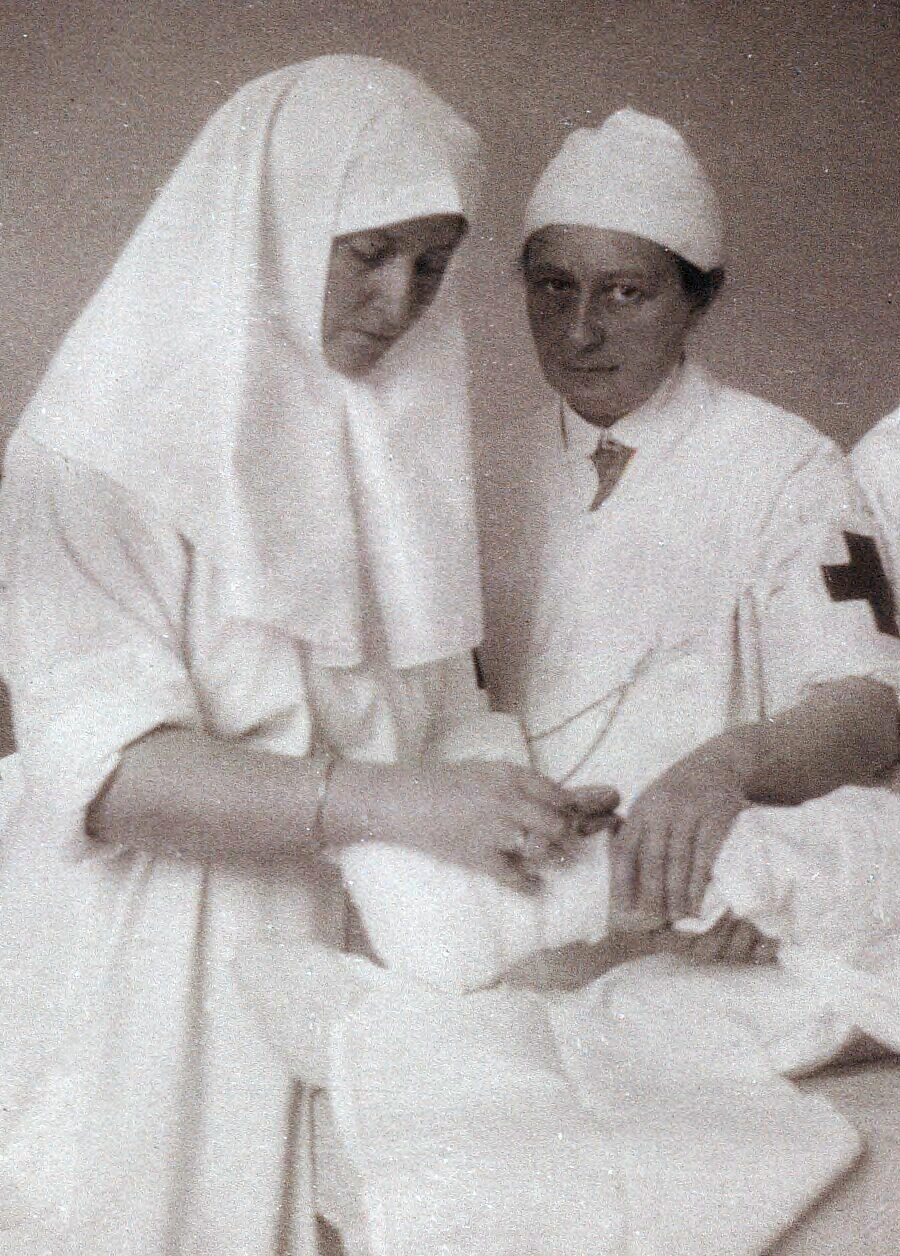
Russian Empress Alexandra Feodorovna with Vera Gedroitz, 1915

==== 20th and 21st centuries ====
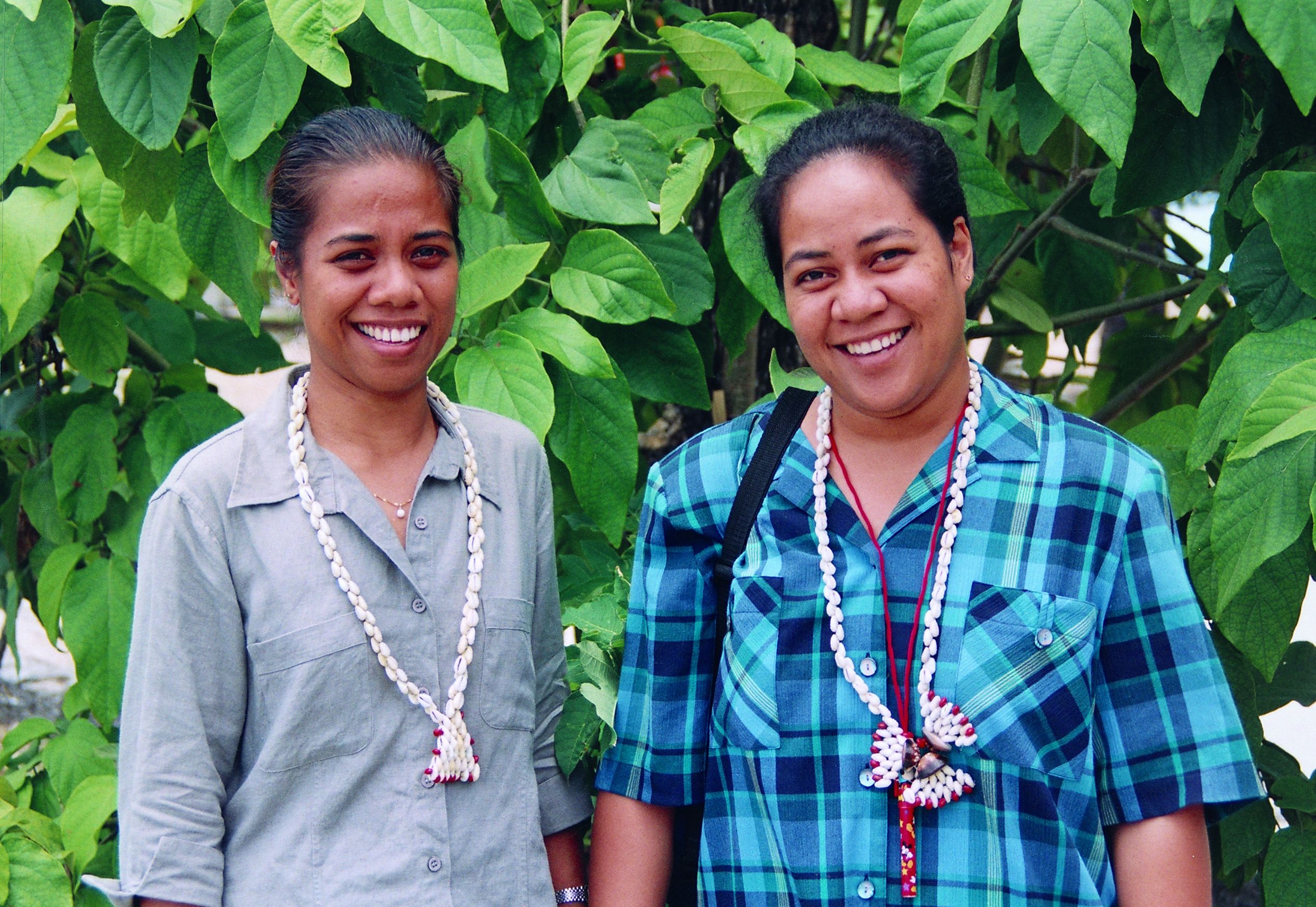
The small island nation of Tuvalu welcomed its first Tuvaluan female doctors in 2008 as a result of Australian aid.

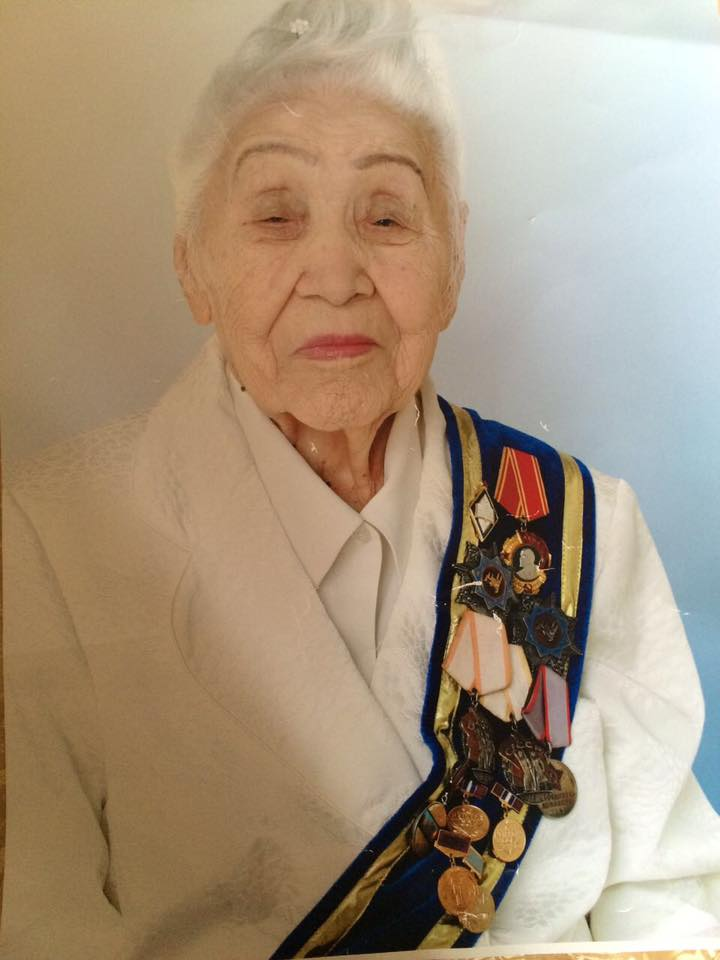
Kakish Ryskulova was the first woman from Kyrgyzstan to become a surgeon.

- Ana Aslan (1897–1988) was a Romanian biologist and physician, specialist in gerontology, academician from 1974 and the director of the National Institute of Geriatrics and Gerontology (1958–1988).
- Marguerite Champendal (1870–1928) was the first woman from Geneva to earn her M.D. at the University of Geneva in 1900.
- Emily Siedeberg (1873–1968) became the first female doctor in New Zealand in 1896. Ellen Dougherty (1844–1919) became New Zealand's first registered nurse in 1902 whereas Akenehi Hei (1878–1910) was the first Māori female to qualify as a nurse in 1908 in New Zealand.
- Yu Meide (1874–1960) became the first Chinese Western medicine female doctor in Macau when she started a medical practice in 1906.
- Oból Voansnac and Sofie Lyberth were the first Western-educated Greenlandic women to train as midwives in Greenland sometime in the early 20th century.
- Lilian Grandin (1876–1924) was the first female doctor in Jersey. In 1907, Eleanor Diaper became the first nurse to work as a district nurse in Jersey.
- Grace Pepe Malemo Haleck (1894–1987), Initia Taveuveu and Feiloa'iga Iosefa became the first qualified female nurses in American Samoa upon completing their training in 1916.
- Dorothy Pantin (1896–1985) was the first woman doctor and surgeon of the Isle of Man.
- Deaconess Mette Cathrine Thomsen was the first trained female nurse to work in the Faroe Islands from 1897 to 1915.
- Eshba Dominika Fominichna (born 1897) became the first female doctor in Abkhazia after having returned from earning her medical degree in 1925 at the Baku State University.
- Safiye Ali (1894–1952) was the first Turkish woman to have obtained a medical degree.
- Damaye Soumah Cissé, mother of the renowned educator and politician Jeanne Martin Cissé (1926–2017), was one of the first midwives in Guinea.
- Josephine Rera (1903–1987) was the first woman doctor in Borough Park and Bensonhurst, Brooklyn in New York City. She received the American Medical Association commendation for 50th Year in Practice. Rera graduated in 1926 with an M.D. diploma at the New York Homeopathic Medical College and Flower Hospital (now the New York Medical College in Valhalla, New York).
- Lai Po-cheun was the first female to study and graduate as a medical student at the Hong Kong University during the 1920s.
- Fatma bint Saada Nassor Lamki became the first female doctor in Zanzibar sometime during the 1920s.
- Kornelija Sertić (1897–1988) was the first woman to graduate from the Medical School in Zagreb (which occurred in 1923).
- Agnes Yewande Savage (1906–1964) was the first woman in West Africa to qualify in medicine
- Joan Refshauge (1906–1979) was the first female doctor appointed to Papua New Guinea by the Australian government in 1947.
- Henriette Bùi Quang Chiêu (1906–2012) was the first female doctor in Vietnam.
- Sophie Redmond (1907–1955) became the first female doctor in Suriname after graduating from medical school in 1935.
- Alma Dea Morani (1907–2001) was the first woman admitted to the American Society of Plastic and Reconstructive Surgeons.
- Yvonne Sylvain (1907–1989) was the first female doctor in Haiti. She was the first woman accepted into the medical school of the University of Haiti, and earned her medical degree there in 1940.
- Virginia Apgar (1909–1974), significant work in anesthesiology and teratology; founded field of neonatology; first woman granted full professorship at Columbia University College of Physicians & Surgeons.
- Pearl Dunlevy (1909–2002) was a physician and epidemiologist and the first female president of the Biological Society of the Royal College of Surgeons of Ireland.
- Isobel Addey Tate (1875–1917) was one of the first women to die while serving as a doctor overseas during World War I.
- Beatrice Emmeline Simmons, a missionary and nurse, was the first Caucasian (female) formally trained in a health care profession to settle as an educator in Kiribati in 1910.
- Elizabeth Abimbola Awoliyi (1910–1971) was the first female physician in Nigeria.
- Badri Teymourtash (1911–1989) was the first Iranian female dentist, who received her higher education in Belgium.
- Andréa de Balmann (1911–2007) was the first female doctor in French Polynesia.
- Jane Elizabeth Hodgson (1915–2006) was a pioneering provider of reproductive healthcare for women and advocate for women's rights.
- Matilda J. Clerk (1916–1984) was the first Ghanaian woman to win a scholarship for university education abroad and the second Ghanaian woman to become a physician. She was also the first woman to obtain a postgraduate diploma in colonial Ghana and West Africa.
- Irene Ighodaro (1916–1995) was the first Sierra Leonean woman to qualify as a medical doctor and the first West African-born female doctor in Britain
- Mary Malahele-Xakana (1917–1982) was the first black woman to register as a medical doctor in South Africa (in 1947).
- Susan Ofori-Atta (1917–1985) was the first woman to qualify as a physician in colonial Ghana.
- Fatima Al-Zayani (1918–1982) became the first qualified female nurse in Bahrain in 1941. In 1969, Sadeeqa Ali Al-Awadi became the first female doctor in Bahrain upon her graduating from medical school.
- Kakish Ryskulova (1918–2018) was the first woman from Kyrgyzstan to qualify as a surgeon.
- Salma Ismail (1918–2014) was the first Malay woman to qualify as a doctor.
- Katherine Burdon, wife of the then-government administrator, was among the women formally registered as midwives for St. Kitts and Anguilla in 1920.
- Ogotu Head (1920–2001) was the first female nursing graduate from Niue after having completed her training in Samoa in 1939.
- Ethna Gaffney (1920–2011) was the first female RCSI Professor of Chemistry.
- Estela Gavidia (b. unknown, circa 1920) was the first woman to graduate as a doctor in El Salvador, which occurred in 1945.
- Gabriela Valenzuela and Froilana Mereles were the first women to graduate with a medical degree in Paraguay in 1924. Valenzuela, however, is considered Paraguay's first practicing female doctor.
- Augusta Jawara (1924–1981) was the first woman from The Gambia to qualify as a state certified midwife in 1953. She completed her training in England.
- Kula Fiaola (1924–2003) became the first qualified (female) nurse in Tokelau in 1951.
- Barbara Ball (1924–2011) was the first female doctor in Bermuda after having started her practice in 1949.
- Margery Clare McKinnon (1924–2014) became the first female doctor in Norfolk Island around 1955.
- Jean Lenore Harney (1925–2020) was the first female doctor from St. Kitts, Nevis and Anguilla to study medicine at the United Kingdom's Liverpool University (c. 1940s)
- Kapelwa Sikota (1928–2006) became the first registered nurse in Zambia in 1952.
- Mary Grant (1928–2016) was the third Ghanaian woman to qualify in medicine
- Daphne Steele (1929–2004), a nurse from Guyana, became the first Black Matron in the National Health Service in 1964.
- Josephine Nambooze (born 1930) started her practice as the first female doctor in Uganda in 1962. Selina Rwashana was the first psychiatric nurse in Uganda after having completed her training in the United Kingdom during the 1950s.
- Tu Youyou (born 1930), first Chinese Nobel laureate in physiology or medicine and the first female citizen of the People's Republic of China to receive a Nobel Prize in any category (2015).
- Lucie Lods and Jacqueline Exbroyat (1931–2013) were the first female doctors in New Caledonia. Lods started her practice in 1938, whereas Exbroyat did so during the 1960s.
- Ayten Berkalp (born 1933) became the first female doctor in Northern Cyprus in 1963.
- Lobsang Dolma Khangkar (1934–1989) was the first female doctor in the region of Tibet.
- Widad Kidanemariam (1935–1988) became the first female doctor in Ethiopia during the 1960s.
- Xhanfize (Frashëri) Basha returned to Albania to become the country's first female doctor upon completing her studies at the University of Philadelphia in 1937.
- Edna Adan Ismail (born 1937) became Somaliland's first nurse midwife during the 1950s upon completing her training at the then-named Borough Polytechnic in the United Kingdom.
- Hajah Habibah Haji Mohd Hussain (born 1937) was among the first women in Brunei to work as a nurse after finishing nursing school in 1955.
- Marguerite Issembe became the first midwife in Gabon in 1940.
- Ulai Otobed (born 1941) from Palau became the first female doctor in Micronesia. In 2020, Lara Reklai became the first Palauan female to complete her medical studies in Cuba.
- María Herminia Yelsi and Digna Maldonado de Candía became the first female professional nurses in Paraguay in 1941.
- Barbara Ross-Lee (born 1942) was the first African American female dean of a U.S. medical school (1993) (Ohio University College of Osteopathic Medicine).
- Kek Galabru (born 1942) became the first female doctor in Cambodia upon obtaining her medical degree in France in 1968.
- Choua Thao (born 1943), at the age of 14, was one of two Hmong girls recruited to receive nursing training around the time of the Secret War in Laos.
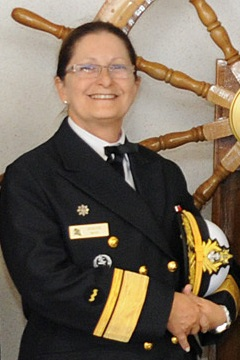
- Rear Adm. Dalva Mendes
  Dalva Maria Carvalho Mendes (born 1956), Brazilian doctor and soldier; first woman to be made a rear admiral in the Brazilian Navy
- Nancy Dickey (born 1950) was the first female president of the American Medical Association.
- Rosa Mari Mandicó (born 1951) became the first qualified female nurse in Andorra in 1971. In 1991, Concepció Álvarez Martínez, Isabel Navarro Gilabert, Dominica Ramond Punsola, Montserrat Rue Capella, Pilar Serrano Gascón, Purificación Valverde Hernández and Maria Líria Viñolas Blasco were the first nurse graduates in Andorra.
- Nancy C. Andrews (born 1958), first female dean of a top-ten medical school in the United States (2007), Duke University School of Medicine.
- Alganesh Haregot and Alganesh Adhanom were among the first women to graduate from a formal nursing school in Eritrea in 1959.
- Vida Mungwira was the first qualified doctor in Nyasaland (Malawi) in 1962.
- Ramlati Ali (born 1961) became the first female doctor in Mayotte in 1996.
- Anniest Hamilton, the first female doctor in Turks and Caicos Islands, began her healthcare career sometime during the 1960s.
- Under the tutelage of matron Daw Dem, Pem Choden, Nim Dem, Choni Zangmo, Gyem, Namgay Dem and Tsendra Pem became the first nurses in Bhutan in 1962.
- Clara Raquel Epstein (born 1963), first Mexican-American woman U.S. trained and U.S. board certified in neurological surgery and youngest recipient of the prestigious Lifetime Achievement Award in Neurosurgery.
- Viopapa Annandale-Atherton is the first Samoan woman to become a doctor upon graduating from New Zealand's University of Otago in 1964. She later returned to Samoa in 1993 and started a medical practice.
- Cora LeEthel Christian became the first female doctor in the United States Virgin Islands upon completing her medical education in the early 1970s.
- Madeline Nyamwanza-Makonese (b. unknown, mid-20th century) was the first female doctor in Zimbabwe. She was the second African woman to become a doctor and the first African woman to graduate from the University of Rhodesia Medical School in 1970.
- Rehana Kausar (b. mid-20th century) became the first woman doctor from Azad Kashmir to graduate from Medical School in Pakistan in 1971.
- Elwyn Chomba became the first female doctor in Zambia in 1973. In 1999, Jacqueline Mulundika-Mulwanda became Zambia's first female surgeon.
- N'Guessan Affoué Christine from Ivory Coast is the first midwife advisor of the United Nations Population Fund (UNFPA). She retired from the profession in 2016 after having worked in the field since 1976.
- Zoe Gardner becomes the first woman in 1976 to overwinter with the Australian Antarctic Program as a medical officer on sub-Antarctic Macquarie Island.
- Margaret Allen (born 1948) became the first female heart transplant surgeon in the United States after having performed a transplant performed in 1985
- Desiree Cox became the first (female) Rhodes Scholar from the Bahamas in 1987. She became a medical doctor upon earning her MBBS at the University of Oxford in 1992.
- Marlene Toma became the first Saint Martin woman to graduate in midwifery in 1990.
- Kinneh Sogur was the first home-trained female medical doctor to graduate from the University of the Gambia (UTG) in 2007. The medical school was the first one to be established in the country in 1999.
- Margeret 'Molly' Brown (died 2008) was the first female doctor in the Cayman Islands
- Esther Apuahe became the first female surgeon in Papua New Guinea in 2011. Naomi Kori Pomat (died 2021) was the first female doctor in Papua New Guinea's Western Province.
- ʻAmelia Afuhaʻamango Tuʻipulotu became the first Tongan (female) to receive a Nursing PhD in 2012.
- Neti Tamarua Herman became the first Cook Islands (female) nurse to earn a doctorate degree in 2015.
- Alice Niragire was the first Rwandan female to graduate with a master's degree in surgery in 2015 since the course was introduced in 2006. In 2018, Claire Karekezi returned to Rwanda to become the country's first female neurosurgeon.
- Natalie Joyce Brewley (died 2016) was the first female doctor in the British Virgin Islands. Stacy Rhymer is considered the first female doctor in the British Virgin Islands' Virgin Gorda.
- Jin Cody became the first (female) certified nurse-midwife in the Northern Mariana Islands in 2017.
- Elisa Gaspar becomes the first female to lead the Medical Association of Angola (ORMED) in 2019.
- George Tarer was the first midwife to graduate in Guadeloupe.
- Olivia Torres Cruz is the first Chamorro female doctor in Guam.
- Errolyn Tungu is the first female obstetrician-gynaecologist in Vanuatu.
- Rebecca Edwards became the first Falkland Islander woman to become a doctor after completing her medical training at the University College London.
- Sergelen Orgoi developed low-cost liver transplantation for developing countries.
- Adama Saidou is the first female surgeon in Niger, as well as the first woman to lead a surgical department.

== See also ==
- American Medical Women's Association
- Female education
- History of medicine
- History of nursing
- List of British women physicians
- List of first female pharmacists by country
- List of first female physicians by country
- List of first women dentists by country
- Sexism in medicine
- Timeline of women's education
- Timeline of women in science
- Women in dentistry
- Phanostratê

== Bibliography ==
- Abram, Ruth Abram., Send Us a Lady Physician: Women Doctors in America, 1835–1920
- Benton, John F. (1985). "Trotula, Women's Problems, and the Professionalization of Medicine in the Middle Ages". Bulletin of the History of Medicine. 59 (1): 30–53. JSTOR 44452036. PMID 3886049. ProQuest 1296295309.
- Blake, Catriona. The Charge of the Parasols: Women's Entry to the Medical Profession
- Borst, Charlotte G. Catching Babies: Professionalization of Childbirth, 1870–1920 (1995), Cambridge, MA: Harvard University Press
- Elisabeth Brooke, Women Healers: Portraits of Herbalists, Physicians, and Midwives (biographical encyclopedia)
- Chenevert, Melodie. STAT: Special Techniques in Assertiveness Training for Women in the Health Profession
- Barbara Ehrenreich and Deirdre English, Witches, Midwives, and Nurses: A History of Women Healers
- Deirdre English and Barbara Ehrenreich, For Her Own Good (gendering of history of midwifery and professionalization of medicine)
- Fette, Julie (2007). "Pride and Prejudice in the Professions: Women Doctors and Lawyers in Third Republic France". Journal of Women's History. 19 (3): 60–86. doi:10.1353/jowh.2007.0055. S2CID 144728859. Project MUSE 221409.
- Grant, Susan-Mary (June 2012). "On the Field of Mercy: Women Medical Volunteers from the Civil War to the First World War". American Nineteenth Century History. 13 (2): 276–278. doi:10.1080/14664658.2012.720092. S2CID 144169798.
- Henderson, Metta Lou. American Women Pharmacists: Contributions to the Profession
- Junod, Suzanne White and Seaman, Barbara, eds. Voices of the Women's Health Movement, Volume OneSeven Stories Press. New York. 2012. pp 60–62.
- Leneman, Leah (April 1994). "Medical women at war, 1914–1918". Medical History. 38 (2): 160–177. doi:10.1017/S0025727300059081. PMC 1036842. PMID 8007751.
- Luchetti, Cathy. Medicine Women: The Story of Early-American Women Doctors. New York: Crown,
- Regina Morantz-Sanchez, Sympathy and Science: Women Physicians in American Medicine (1985 first ed.; 2001)
- More, Ellen S. Restoring the Balance: Women Physicians and the Profession of Medicine, 1850–1995
- Perrone, Bobette H. et al. Medicine Women, Curanderas, and Women Doctors (1993); cross-cultural anthropological survey of traditional societies
- Pringle, Rosemary. Sex and Medicine: Gender, Power and Authority in the Medical Profession
- Schwirian, Patricia M. Professionalization of Nursing: Current Issues and Trends (1998), Philadelphia: Lippencott, ISBN 0781710456
- Walsh, Mary Roth. Doctors Wanted: No Women Need Apply: Sexual Barriers in the Medical Profession, 1835–1975 (1977)

=== Biographies ===
- Laurel Thatcher Ulrich, A Midwife's Tale: The Life of Martha Ballard Based on Her Diary, 1785–1812 (1991)
- Rebecca Wojahn, Dr. Kate: Angel on Snowshoes (1956)
