= Milica =

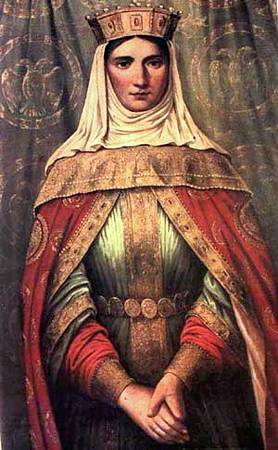
- Princess Milica of Serbia in a painting by Vladislav Titlbah, late 19th century, The National Museum in Kikinda
- Pronunciation: MILL-its-uh
- Gender: female

Origin
- Origin: Slavic
- Meaning: "sweetling"
- Region of origin: countries that speak Slavic languages

Other names
- Related names: Militza

Milica (Serbian Cyrillic: Милица; pronounced 'Millitsa') is a feminine name popular in Balkan countries. It is a diminutive form of the given name Mila, meaning 'kind', 'dear' or 'sweet'. The name was used for a number of queens and princesses, including Milica of Serbia, wife of Tsar Lazar, who is honored as a saint in the Serbian Orthodox Church. Milica has been the most popular name for girls born in Serbia since 1991, and is overall the most common female given name in the country. The name of Princess Milica of Montenegro was often translated as Militza in English language publications.

== Individuals named Milica ==
- Milica of Serbia (1335–1405), Princess of Serbia, wife of Lazar of Serbia
- Milica Despina (1485–1554), Princess consort of Wallachia, wife of Neagoe Basarab
- Milica of Montenegro (1866–1951), Montenegrin princess
- Milica Bešević (1896–1941), Serbian painter, illustrator, the first female set designer at the National Theatre in Belgrade
- Milica Branković (died 1464), Serbian princess, wife of Leonardo III Tocco
- Milica Čubrilo (born 1969), Serbian politician and diplomat
- Milica Dabović (born 1982), Serbian basketball player
- Milica Davies (born 1981 as Milica Ilić), Australian classical guitarist
- Milica Gardašević (born 1998), Serbian long jumper
- Milica Janković (1881–1939), Serbian writer
- Milla Jovovich (born 1975 as Milicaa Jovović), American actress, model and musician
- Milica Kacin Wohinz (1930–2021), Slovenian historian
- Milica Majstorović (born 1989), Serbian singer
- Milica Mandić (born 1991), Serbian taekwondo athlete
- Milica Mićić Dimovska (1947–2013), Serbian writer
- Milica Miljanov (ca. 1860–?), Montenegrin soldier and WWI heroine
- Mila Mulroney (born 1953 as Milica Pivnički), wife of Canadian Prime Minister Brian Mulroney
- Milica Ninković (1854–1881), Serbian feminist, translator and editor
- Milica Pap (born 1973), Yugoslavian pianist
- Milica Pavlović (born 1991), Serbian singer
- Milica Pejanović-Đurišić (born 1959), Montenegrin politician
- Milica Rakić (1996–1999), three-year-old Serbian child killed during the NATO bombing of Yugoslavia
- Milica Šterić (1914–1998), Serbian architect
- Milica Stojadinović-Srpkinja (1828–1878), Serbian poet
- Milica Šviglin Čavov, Croatian female doctor
- Milica Todorović (born 1990), Serbian singer and actress
- Milica Tomić (born 1960), Serbian artist
- Milica Vukadinović (born 1968), Serbian former basketball player

== Fictional characters ==
- Milica Bellic, the mother of Niko Bellic, the main protagonist of Grand Theft Auto IV
- Militsa Gnosis, a love interest of Valkyrie Cain, the main protagonist of Skulduggery Pleasant.

== See also ==
- Slavic names
