= Dalva (name) =

Dalva is a feminine given name and a surname. The given name is derived from "estrela d'alva", which means "morning star" in Portuguese.

== People with the given name ==
- Dalva de Oliveira (1917–1972), Brazilian singer
- Dalva Figueiredo, Brazilian politician
- Dalva Mendes (born 1956), Brazilian doctor
- Dalva Peres (born 1996), Angolan handball player

== Surname ==
- Robert Dalva (1942–2023), American filmmaker
