= Rosa A. González =

Puerto Rican writer, nurse and activist

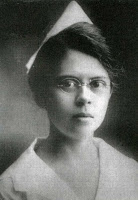
- Rosa A. González c. 1916
- Born: 1889; Lares, Puerto Rico
- Died: July 25, 1981 (aged 91–92); Guaynabo, Puerto Rico
- Occupations: Registered Nurse and author

Rosa A. González, RN, (1889 – July 25, 1981) was a nurse, author, feminist and activist. She established various health clinics throughout Puerto Rico and was the founder of The Association of Registered Nurses of Puerto Rico. In 1929, Gonzalez wrote a book titled Los Hechos Desconocidos (The Unknown Facts), in which she denounced the discrimination against women and nurses in Puerto Rico. González’s book convinced James R. Beverley, the Interim Governor of Puerto Rico, to sign Ley 77 (Law 77) in May 1930, which established a Nurses Examining Board. In 1978, she was the first recipient of the Public Health Department of Puerto Rico Garrido Morales Award.

== Early years ==
González (birth name: Rosa Angélica González) was born and raised in the town of Lares, Puerto Rico. There she received her primary and secondary education. She was still a child when Spain ceded Puerto Rico to the United States in accordance with the agreement reached in the 1898 Treaty of Paris, which officially ended the Spanish–American War.

She attended the Congressional day school and converted to Protestantism when she was nine years old. Her father, a small merchant, suddenly died when she was just a child and she went to live with her aunt and uncle. While she was attending public secondary school she learned that the Presbyterian Hospital of Puerto Rico needed nurses. She became interested in pursuing a career in nursing despite the protests of her family. González enrolled in the Presbyterian Hospital School of Nursing in San Juan, Puerto Rico, where she earned her nurse certificate in 1909. In 1914, she went to New York City and continued her studies and earned the title of Registered Nurse at the New York Presbyterian Hospital.

== Return to Puerto Rico ==
In 1916, González returned to her homeland and organized the Dr. Susoni clinic in the city of Arecibo. Also in that year, she founded and presided over The Association of Registered Nurses of Puerto Rico. Under her leadership the association was able to raise enough funds for the construction of a building to house the Club de Nurses, where convalescent nurses could reside. In 1917, González wrote her first book Diccionario Médico para la Enfermera (Nurse's Medical Dictionary).

In 1918, the Swine Flu swept through Army camps and training posts around the world including Puerto Rico, infecting one quarter of all soldiers and killing more than 55,000 American troops. González was sent to Ponce, Puerto Rico, where she assisted Dr. Dolores Piñero and four male colleagues, when they opened a 400-bed hospital to care for infected patients and World War I veterans.

González served as the voluntary Director of Emergency Unit in the city of Mayagüez, helping the victims of the San Fermín earthquake. From 1919 to 1924 González was the Director of Puerto Rico's Presbyterian Hospital School of Nursing. During this time (1921), she traveled to New York and attended Columbia University. After leaving the Presbyterian Hospital she became director of the nursing at the Hospital Episcopal San Lucas (St. Lukes Hospital) in Ponce. While there she organized the nursing program and finally published her “Diccionario Medico para Enfermeras”, which she had written in 1917.

In 1924, she worked as an educator and trainer of nurses for the Sanitation Department of Puerto Rico. In 1925, she was named director of the American Red Cross dispensary in the barrio of Puerta de Tierra in Santurce. She was hired by the mayor of San Juan, Roberto H. Todd Weels, to organize the nursing school in Santurce and named the Executive Secretary of the Association of Graduated Nurses of Puerto Rico. In 1926, González founded a magazine for nurses called Puerto Rico.. She publicly criticized the deplorable conditions of the municipal hospital and was fired in 1927, by the mayor on the false accusation that she signed diplomas for nursing students who had not completed their clinical training requirements. She denied the charges but, was unable to sue the city because a law at the time forbade municipal employees from suing the city.

== Nurses Examining Board ==
In 1929, González wrote a book titled Los Hechos Desconocidos (The Unknown Facts), which she dedicated to the Governor of Puerto Rico, the Puerto Rican Legislature and the Medical Association. The book was also dedicated to the Puerto Rican Nurses Association and the Association of Puerto Rican Women Surrogates.

In her book she denounced the corruption, abuses and unhealthy practices in the municipal hospital. González used her book to promote the establishment of a Nurse Examiners Board in Puerto Rico. As a Women’s Rights activist, she also denounced the discriminatory practices against women in the health care professions. González’s book convinced James R. Beverley, the Interim Governor of Puerto Rico, to sign Ley 77 (Law 77) in May 1930. Previously the Medical Board, which was made up of male doctors who regulated nursing matters, had pressured the Governor not to sign the bill into law. This was because if the bill became law it would establish a Nurses Examining Board responsible for setting and enforcing standards of nursing education and practices. González believed that the "Medical Class" discriminated against female nurses and stated this clearly in her book:

"In our country any man who is active in a political party, will be considered capable of handling an administrative position, regardless of how inept he is. "

"To this day the 'Medical Class' has not accepted nurses who have the same goal as doctors: the well-being of the patient. Both professions need each other in order to be successful."

The law (Ley 77), influenced by González’s written work, also stipulated that the Board of Medical Examiners include two nurses and established the Nurse Examiners Board. The passage of Ley 77 proved that women can operate both in the formal public sphere while working in a female oriented field.

== Founder of medical institutions in Puerto Rico ==
Amongst the institutions which she organized were the Amarosa Sanitarium in the town of Villalba (1929), the school of the Institute of Medical Surgery (1930), and the nursing school on the grounds of the School of Tropical Medicine in San Juan (1931).

Dr. Clarence Gamble, an American physician, established a network of birth control clinics in Puerto Rico during the period of 1936 to 1939. He believed that Puerto Rican women and the women from other American colonies did not have the mental capacity and were too poor to understand and use diaphragms for birth control as those in the United States mainland. He inaugurated a program funded by the Rockefeller Foundation which would replace the use of diaphragms with foam powders, cremes and spermicidal jellies. He did not know that in the past Gonzalez had publicly battled with prominent physicians and named González and Carmen Rivera de Alvarez, another nurse who was a Puerto Rican independence advocate, to take charge of the insular birth control program. González organized and, from 1936 to 1940, headed the first clinic dedicated to maternal health in her hometown of Lares. However, the insular program lacked funding and failed. When the United States entered World War II, González was named Director of the Nurses Services of the American Red Cross in Puerto Rico.

== Legacy ==
In 1978, González became the first recipient of the Garrido Morales award, an honor bestowed upon her by the Governing Board of the Association of Public Health in Puerto Rico. She continued to provide medical services free of charge for the children in Guaynabo where she resided. She died in her home on July 25, 1981 .

The Salud Pro-Mujer (Pro-Woman's Health) organization named an award the "ROSA GONZALEZ AWARD" which recognizes health professionals who have contributed to improving the health of women.

== See also ==
- List of Puerto Ricans
- History of women in Puerto Rico
