= Milica Ninković =

Serbian translator

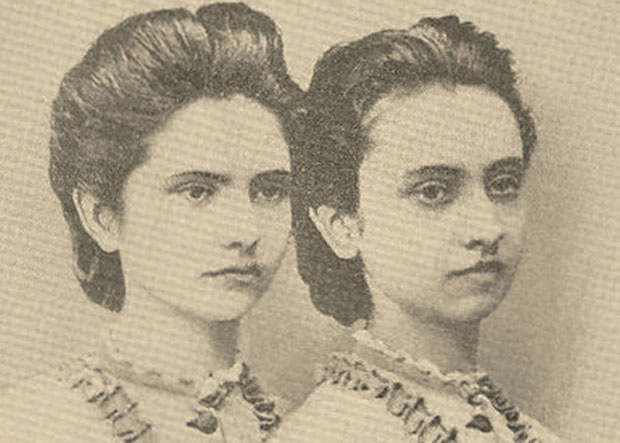
- Milica (left) with her sister Anka
- Born: 30 January 1854; Újvidék, Kingdom of Hungary, Austrian Empire (now Novi Sad, Serbia)
- Died: 18 November 1881 (aged 27); Kragujevac, Serbia
- Other names: Milica Ninkovich, Todorović, or Todorovich
- Education: University of Zurich
- Occupations: Feminist, translator and editor
- Spouse: Pera Todorović

Milica Ninković (30 January 1854 – 18 November 1881) was a Serbian feminist, translator and editor.

== Life ==
Milica Ninković was born on 30 January 1854 in Újvidék, in the Kingdom of Hungary (now Novi Sad, Serbia). She attended the School of Pedagogy of the University of Zurich from 1872 to 1874 with her sister Anka. Upon leaving Switzerland in 1874, they decided to establish a private high school for girls in Kragujevac, Serbia, but permission was not granted by the government and they were threatened with expulsion from Serbia. Ninković avoided this by marrying the journalist and future politician Pera Todorović. During the Serbian–Ottoman War of 1876–78, she volunteered as a nurse. After the war, she worked for the British Legation in Belgrade, Serbia, until pressure from the Serbian government forced the British to fire her. Ninković then left the country to study medicine abroad, but caught tuberculosis and died in Kragujevac on 18 November 1881.

== Activities ==
Shortly after their marriage, Ninković and her husband founded the newspaper Old Liberation (Staro Oslobođenje) and edited and she edited its supplement. She also worked as a translator and translated, among other works, Victor Hugo's The History of a Crime (French: Histoire d'un crime) into Serbian and Svetozar Marković's Serbia in the East (Srbija na istoku) into Russian. Upon her return from abroad in 1880, Ninković established one of the first feminist organizations of Serbs in Újvidék.
