= Dolores Piñero =

Puerto Rican physician (1892–1975)

- Born: February 4, 1892; San Juan, Puerto Rico
- Died: 1975 (aged 82–83); Río Piedras, Puerto Rico
- Military career
- Allegiance: United States
- Branch: United States Army
- Unit: U.S. Army Medical Corps

Dolores Mercedes Piñero, (1892–1975) was one of the first four Puerto Rican women to earn a medical degree. She was also one of the first civilian doctors, and the first Puerto Rican female doctor to serve under contract in the U.S. Army during World War I. During World War I, Piñero helped establish a hospital in Puerto Rico to attend soldiers who had contracted the swine flu.

== Early years ==
Piñero was born in San Juan, Puerto Rico at a time when the island was still a Spanish colony. There she received her primary and secondary education. Spain ceded Puerto Rico to the United States in accordance with the agreement reached in the 1898 Treaty of Paris, which officially ended the Spanish–American War. Piñero was sent by her family to Boston, Massachusetts where she became fluent in English and continued her college education. In 1913, she earned her medical degree from the College of Physicians and Surgeons in Boston. Piñero was one of the first four women from Puerto Rico to earn a medical degree. The other three were María Elisa Rivera Díaz and Ana Janer in 1909, and Palmira Gatell in 1910.

== Return to Puerto Rico ==
After earning her degree, Piñero returned to Puerto Rico and set up her medical and anesthesia practice in what was then the town of Río Piedras (it is now a section of San Juan).

In 1917, with the advent of World War I, the United States approved the Jones–Shafroth Act which conferred U.S. citizenship on Puerto Ricans. Puerto Ricans, with the exception of the women, were eligible for the draft.

When the United States entered World War I, the U.S. Army Medical Corps believed that they had enough male physicians to cover their needs. Piñero applied for a position as a contract surgeon only to be turned down. After writing a letter to the Army Surgeon General in Washington, D.C. explaining her intentions, she received a telegram ordering her to report to Camp Las Casas at Santurce, Puerto Rico where she was assigned to the Medical Service Corps of the Army Medical Department.

By 1918, the Army realized that there was a shortage of physicians specializing in anesthesia, a low-salary specialty required in the military operating rooms. Therefore, the Army reluctantly began hiring women physicians as civilian contract employees. Contract physicians, however had little status within the military. They did not wear uniforms and had little authority.

In October 1918, Piñero signed her contract with the Army. In this manner, and at her own insistence, Piñero contributed her professional skills to the war effort. She was reassigned to the Army General Hospital of Fort Brooke, located in the former Ballajá Barracks (in the grounds of the Fort San Felipe del Morro) in Old San Juan. There she worked as an anesthesiologist during the mornings, and in the laboratory during the afternoons. Piñero and four male colleagues received orders to open a 400-bed hospital in Ponce, Puerto Rico, to care for the patients who had been infected with influenza, known also as "the Swine Flu." Among the nurses who served in Ponce with Piñero was Rosa A. González, a noted registered nurse who authored The Nurses Medical Dictionary. The Swine Flu had swept through Army camps and training posts around the world, infecting one quarter of all soldiers and killing more than 55,000 American troops. After the flu epidemic ended, Piñero was ordered back to the Army base hospital at San Juan.

== Post World War I ==
When her contract ended at the close of World War I, Piñero returned to her private practice in Río Piedras. She married Celestino López Pérez and had a son Jose Antonio López Piñero and on March 17, 1922, had a daughter named Dolores "Lolin" Piñero-López (1922-2011) who was the founder of "Old Whims and New Fancies", an antique store in El Paso, Texas.

Little is known of Piñero's later years, with the exception that she was one of the leaders of the local Women's Civic Club and that she worked for the Puerto Rico Department of Health. Piñero was also the first Puerto Rican female to be named to the Puerto Rican Medical Examiners Board. Piñero resided with her husband in Monacillo, Río Piedras, Puerto Rico. She died in 1975 in San Juan, Puerto Rico.

== See also ==
- List of Puerto Ricans
- Puerto Rican women in the military
- Puerto Ricans in World War I
- Puerto Rican scientists and inventors
- History of women in Puerto Rico
