= List of British women physicians =

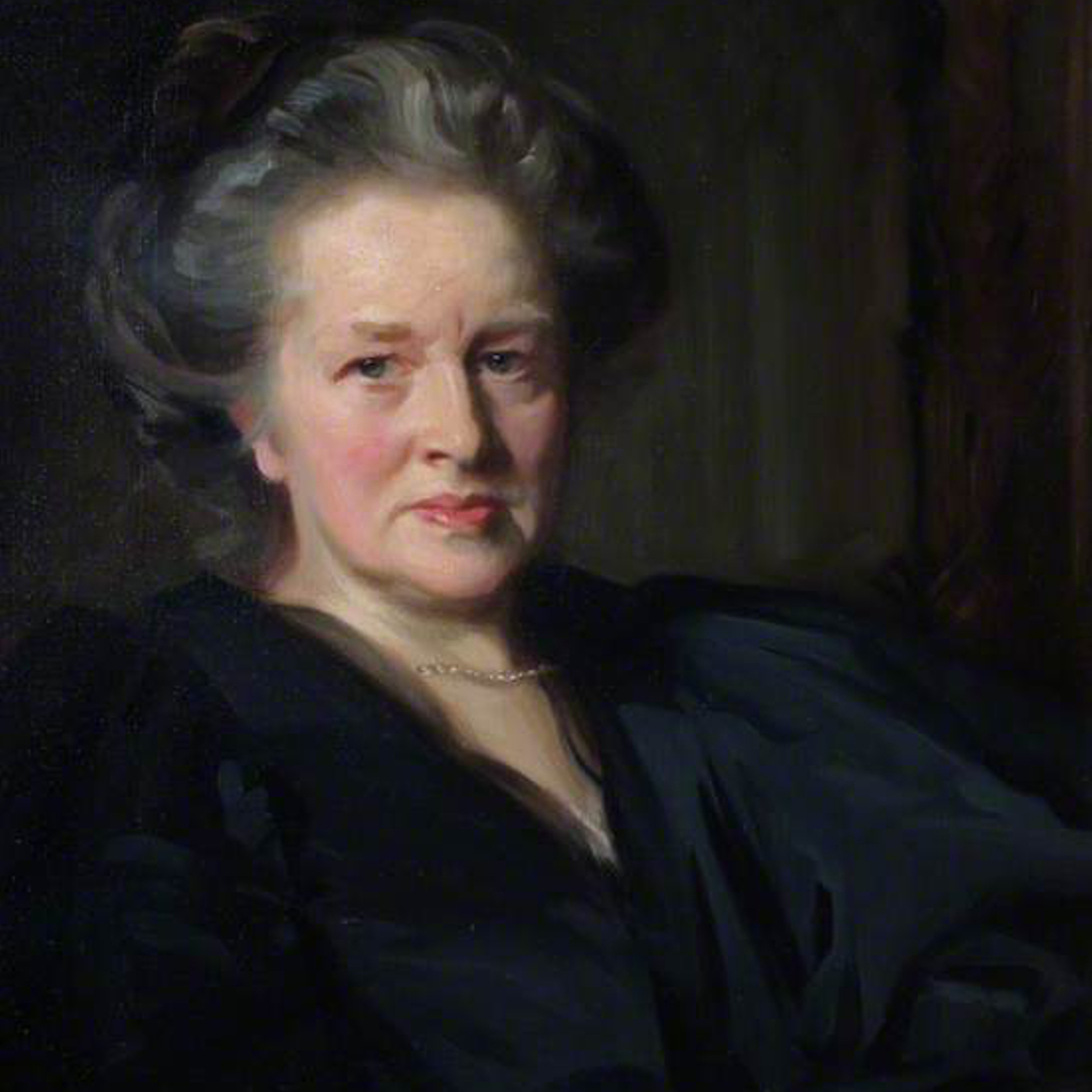
Elizabeth Garrett Anderson

This is a list of British women physicians.

== A ==
- Heather Ashton (1929–2019), physician and psychopharmacologist.

== B ==
- Josephine Barnes (1912–1999), obstetrician and gynaecologist, first female president of the British Medical Association.
- Emily Blackwell (1826–1910), third woman to earn a medical degree in the United States (born Bristol).
- Margaret Bromhall (1890–1967), English radiotherapist.
- Edith Mary Brown (1864–1956), founded the first medical training facility for women in Asia.

== C ==
- Sheila Cassidy (born 1937), known for her work in the hospice movement and human rights campaigning.
- Maud Chadburn
- Hilda Clark (doctor)
- Rachel Clarke
- Vicky Clement-Jones
- Harriet Clisby

== D ==
- Sally Davies (doctor)

== G ==
- Elizabeth Garrett Anderson (1836–1917), co-founder of London School of Medicine for Women.
- Louisa Garrett Anderson

== H ==
- Gillian Hanson
- Mary Hemingway Rees
- Gertrude Herzfeld

== J ==
- Sophia Jex-Blake
- Caroline Johnson

== K ==
- Anna Kingsford (1846–1888)
- Judith Kingston

== L ==
- Barrie Lambert
- Janet Lane-Claypon
- Elizabeth Lepper

== M ==
- Isabella Macdonald Macdonald
- Joan Malleson
- Louisa Martindale
- Florence Miller
- Jessie Murray
- Christine Murrell

== P ==
- Innes Hope Pearse

== S ==
- Ella Campbell Scarlett
- Mary Scharlieb
- Edith Shove
- Miriam Stoppard
- Mary Sturge

== V ==
- Alice Vickery

== W ==
- Eliza Walker Dunbar (1845-1925), first woman to receive a UK medical licence by examination (Jan 1877).
- Marjory Warren
- Edith Whetnall
- Ethel Williams (physician)
- Jane Wilson-Howarth
- Helena Rosa Wright

== See also ==
- List of first female physicians by country
- List of physicians
- Women in medicine
