= The History of a Crime =

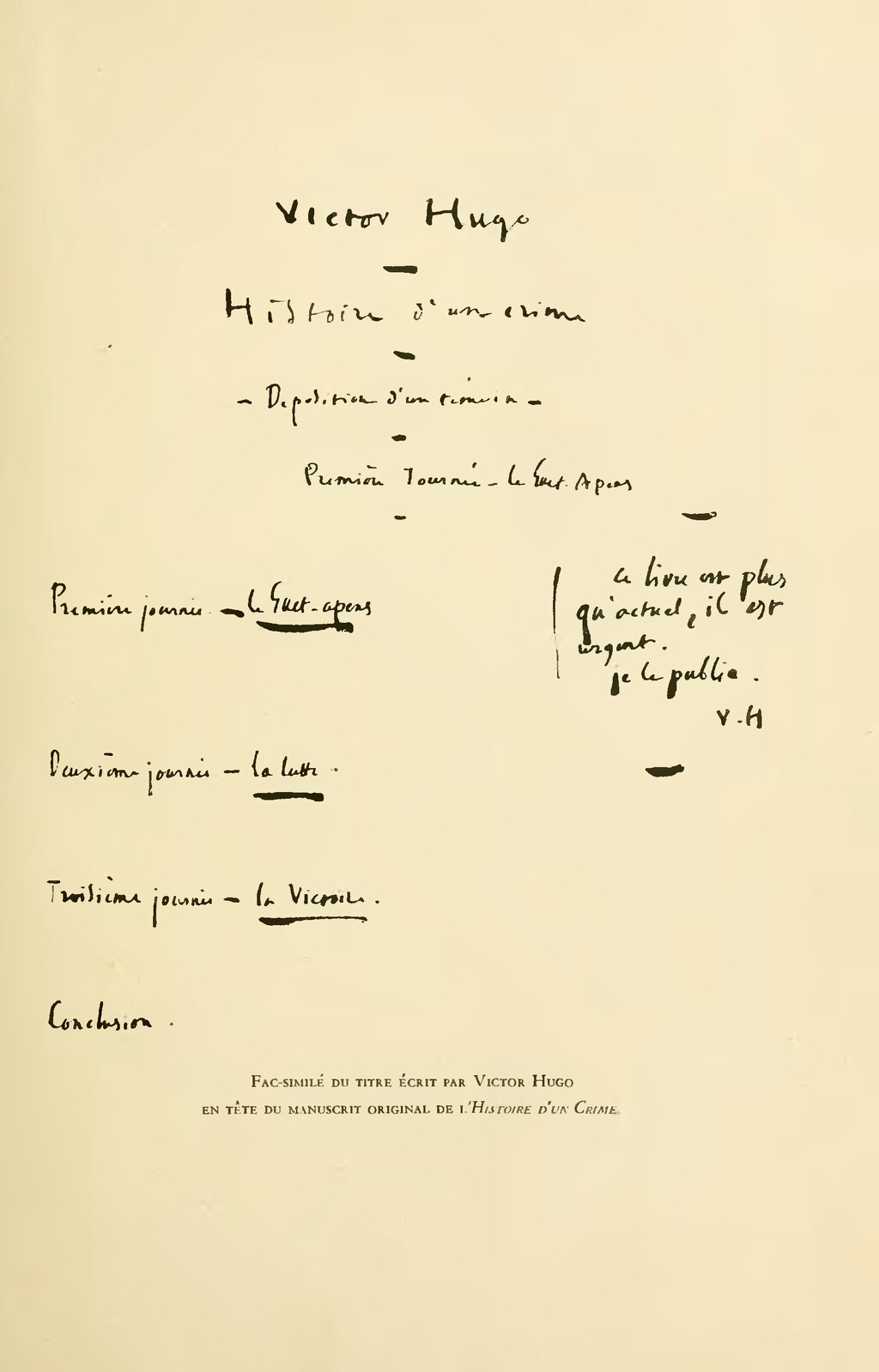
Facsimile of the title with the epigraph

The History of a Crime (French: Histoire d'un crime, 1877) is an essay by Victor Hugo about the takeover of France by Louis Napoleon Bonaparte, who became the Emperor Napoleon III.
