= Henriette Saloz-Joudra =

Russian-born physician, private practitioner in Geneva

- Born: Henriette Joudra; 1855; Vitebsk, the Russian Empire
- Died: 1928 (aged 72–73); Geneva, Switzerland
- Occupation: Medical doctor
- Spouse: Charles-Eugène Saloz
- Children: 2 sons

Henriette Saloz-Joudra (1855–1928) was a Russian-born physician, the first woman to open a private medical practice in Geneva, Switzerland.

== Biography ==
She was born Henriette Joudra in 1855 in Vitebsk, the Russian Empire (now Belarus), to a family of landowners, Russian-Polish aristocrats. She began her schooling in Saint Petersburg with the encouragement of an uncle, the surgeon Nikolay Pirogov (1810-1881), who vocally supported female education in the science and medicine. She went on to graduate as a physician from the University of Geneva.

In 1883, a few months after she and her fiancé graduated from medical school, she married Charles-Eugène Saloz. They went on to have two sons who also went into careers in medicine, pursuing their studies at the University of Geneva.

=== Medical studies ===
Henriette pursued the best education she could in Russia, but medical schools there did not allow women to receive the diploma of doctor. Their only option was to earn the certification of "learned midwife."

However, women were allowed to attend The University of Geneva, which was officially founded in 1873, because in its statutes it incorporated the principle of diversity. (According to Kulik, Switzerland was the first European country (in 1864) that allowed women to undertake medical studies.) Therefore, women were allowed to join the Faculty of Medicine if they had earned the necessary credentials, usually from outside Geneva. Henriette Joudra became an auditor in 1876, and then attended as an official student between 1877 and 1881. Finally, in June 1883, she successfully defended her doctoral thesis in cardiology, titled Contribution to the clinical study of galloping noise, which is a heart rhythm ailment.

A review of her educational research reveals a positive reception from doctors.

"Mme Saloz has demonstrated in her thesis an eminently clinical and scientific spirit. Hopefully, thanks to this same tenacity, an imminent future will reveal the last word for this question that she has so brilliantly tackled."

=== Medical practice ===
The couple set up separate medical practices in the same building in Geneva's Rive district. By doing so, Henriette Saloz-Joudra became the first woman to open a private medical practice in Geneva. The two doctors counseled their own patients with Saloz-Joudra primarily seeing women and children who were comfortable seeking her guidance. She also specialized in general medicine, gynecology, obstetrics and pediatrics. With a strong clientele, she earned financial security and "the reputation of an active, competent and independent woman."

In Geneva, she was a contemporary of Dr. Marguerite Champendal, the first woman born in that city to obtain a doctorate in medicine at the University of Geneva (1900).

Saloz-Joudra's successful medical practice, however, was not enough to change the subordinate position of female doctors in Geneva. In 1894, she applied for admission to the Medical Society of Geneva, an application that was subsequently denied. In the Society's annual report, published that same year, it says: “On the proposal of a few members, our office met and we even held an extraordinary meeting to examine the opportunity of some modifications to our regulations. The result of these meetings was that, for the moment, no change is necessary." After the Society refused of his wife's candidacy, Dr. Charles Saloz decided he would not apply. Neither would ever be admitted to that professional association.

== Death ==
Saloz-Joudra died in 1928 in Geneva, two years after an accident caused her to lose her sight and forced her to close her medical practice of 40 years.

== External sources ==
- Rothhammer, Amilu. (2001). A Lofty Mountain to Scale: A Tale of Perseverance. Archives of surgery (Chicago, Ill. : 1960). 136. 499-504. 10.1001/archsurg.136.5.499. https://www.researchgate.net/publication/11992999_A_Lofty_Mountain_to_Scale_A_Tale_of_Perseverance
- Dreifuss, Jean-Jacques, "The first students at the Faculty of Medicine and their professional activities in Geneva," Gesnerus: Swiss Journal of the history of medicine and sciences, n ° 48, 1991, pp. 429–438.
- Dreifuss, Jean-Jacques, Tokhonov, Natalia, "Henriette Saloz-Joudra," in Deuber Ziegler, Erica, Tikhonov, Natalia (dir.), Women in memory of Geneva. From the 15th to the 20th century, Geneva, Éditions Suzanne Hurter, 2005, pp. 135–136.
