= Marguerite Champendal =

Swiss physician (1870–1928)

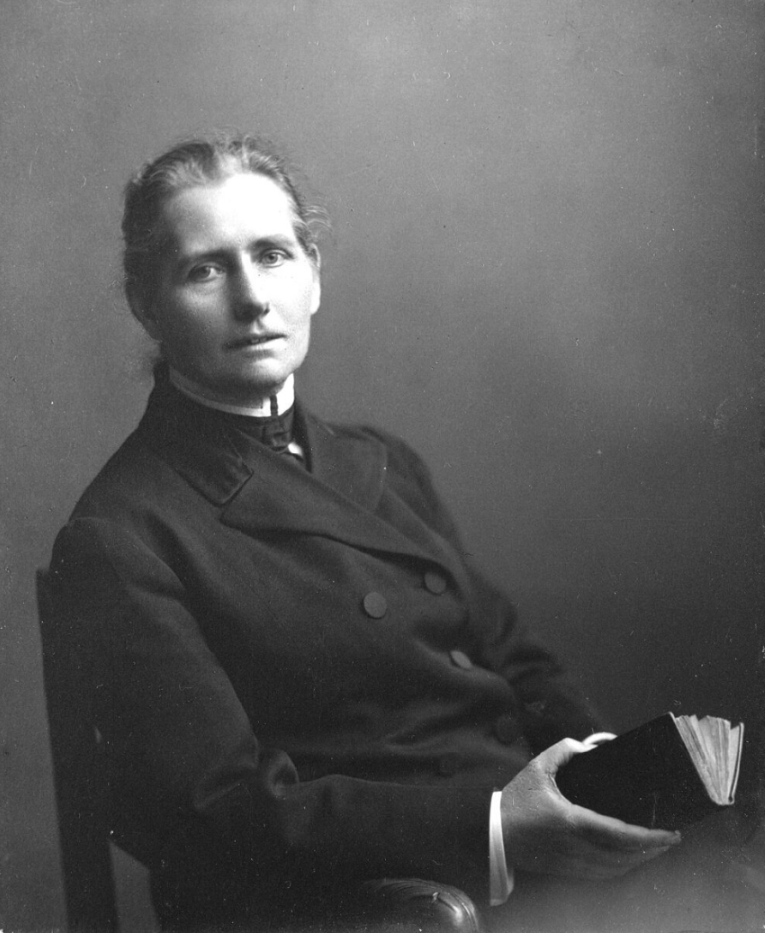
- Photograph by Frédéric Boissonnas
- Born: 2 June 1870; Petit-Saconnex, Geneva, Switzerland
- Died: 25 October 1928 (aged 58); Geneva, Switzerland
- Occupation: Doctor
- Parents: Jacques Henri Samuel Champendal (father); Christine Elisabeth Roch (mother)

Marguerite Champendal (1870-1928) was a Swiss doctor and educator. She was the first woman from Geneva to obtain a doctorate in medicine at the University of Geneva (1900). Champendal founded a center for distributing pasteurized milk for infants there, as well as an acclaimed nursing school.

== Biography ==
Champendal was born on 2 June 1870 in Petit-Saconnex, a neighborhood in Geneva, Switzerland. She was the third child of pastor Jacques Henri Samuel Champendal and Christine Elisabeth Roch.

Champendal taught in Paris and Berlin, and then, against the will of her family, began medical studies in Geneva. In 1900 she became the first woman from that city to obtain a doctorate in medicine in 1900. (While 34 other women also obtained a doctorate at the same time, none were from the city of Geneva.) Her doctoral thesis was titled, Des varices congénitales (Congenital varicose veins).

In Geneva, she was a contemporary of Dr. Henriette Saloz-Joudra (1855–1928), who had earned her medical degree in 1883 at the University of Geneva and became the first woman to open her own private medical practice in the city.

=== Medical practice ===
After graduation, she practiced in the popular districts of the city.

Based on what she had seen during a previous visit to Paris, a project by Doctor Gaston Variot called the Drop of Milk (La Goutte de Lait), Champendal created her own center in Geneva (by the same name) in 1901. There she arranged for the distribution of pasteurized milk for infants and as well as consultation services to help young mothers. To further help the mothers, in 1916, she published the Little Manual for Mothers with guidance for women with babies.

In 1905, having already spent one and a half years tending to women giving birth, she formed the school of nursing, Le Bon Secours. She directed the school until her early death in 1928. Champendal is remembered there as "a visionary and deeply modern woman."

She was a private doctor at the medical school from 1913 to 1919.

In 1918, Champendal earned professional status at the University of Geneva, the first woman to do so.

=== Death ===
Dr. Champendal died on 25 October 1928 in Geneva at 58, from a cardiac arrest.

== Honors ==
In Geneva, a street bears her name, Chemin Doctoresse Champendal.
