= Maria Cuțarida-Crătunescu =

First female doctor in Romania

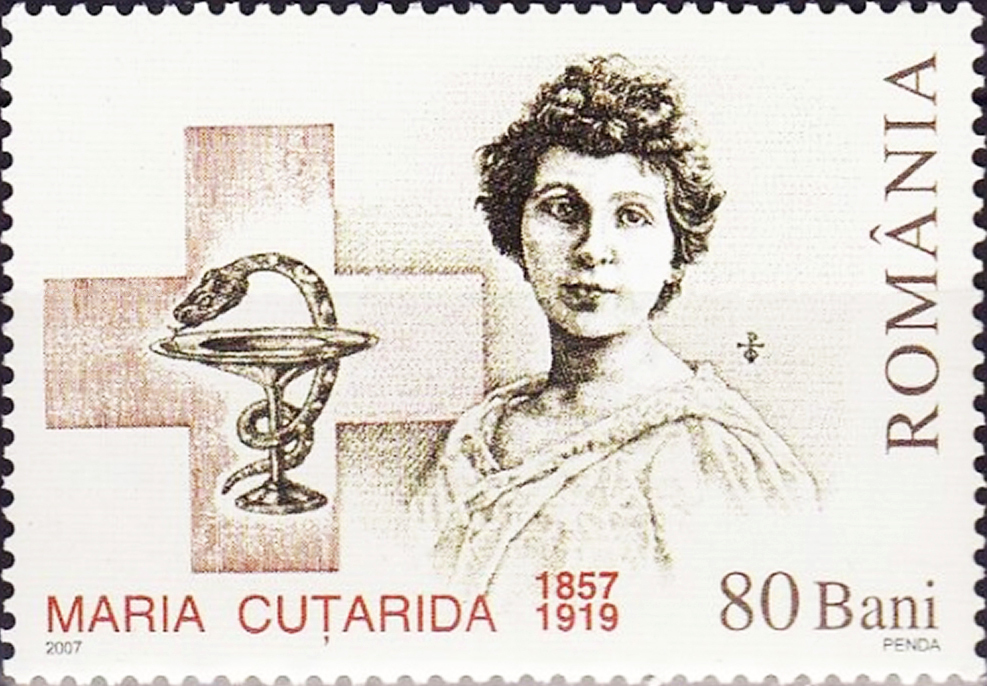
Maria Cuţarida 1857–1919. Stamp of Romania, 2007.

Maria Cuțarida-Crătunescu (February 10, 1857 – November 16, 1919) was the first woman to be a medical doctor in Romania. As an active feminist supporter, she founded the Maternal Society in 1897, and in 1899 organised the first crèche in Romania.

As a native of Călărași, she graduated from the Central School for Girls in Bucharest. She then enrolled in the Faculty of Medicine at the University of Zurich in 1877, but because of language difficulties and advantages received by students with diplomas from France, she transferred to the University of Montpellier, where she did her undergraduate thesis. Cuțarida-Crătunescu did her hospital internship and doctoral training in Paris. She became a doctor in 1884, graduating magna cum laude. Her thesis was titled Hydrorrhee to valeur et dans le cancer du corps semiologique del uters. She made a request to Brâncovenesc Hospital, asking to work on a post-secondary medical department "Diseases of Women", but was turned down without explanation, and instead given a post as professor of hygiene. In 1886 she became head of the department of hygiene of the asylum "Elena Lady", and in 1891 was the head of the department of gynecology at Filantropia Hospital in Bucharest.

Cuțarida-Crătunescu founded a maternal society in 1897 to help poor children, and was invited to congresses in Brussels (1907) and Copenhagen (1910), where she presented the Romanian medical actions initiated against infant mortality and a study on nurseries in Romania. She was a feminist and presented Work of Women in Romania about Romanian women's intellectual work to a Congress held in Paris in 1900. During World War I she worked as a physician in Military Hospital no. 134. She retired after the war for health reasons and died in Bucharest in 1919.
