= Naval Hospital Marcílio Dias =

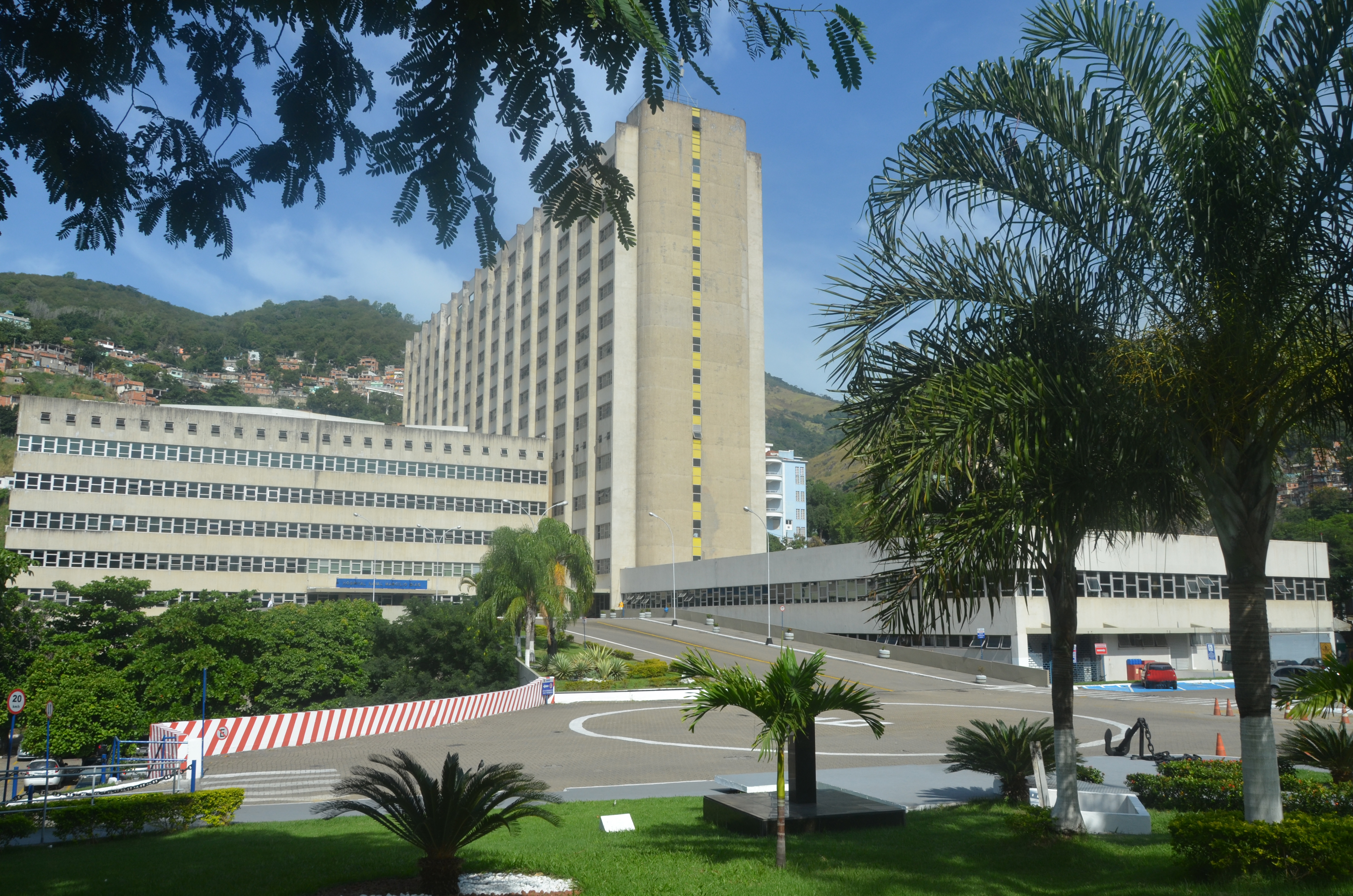
- Naval Hospital Marcílio Dias in 2014

Geography
- Location: Lins de Vasconcelos, Rio de Janeiro, Rio de Janeiro, Brazil
- Coordinates: 22.9025°S 43.2789°W

Organisation
- Care system: Sistema Único de Saúde
- Type: Public
- Network: Federal

Services
- Emergency department: Yes
- Beds: 618

History
- Former name: Hospital da Marinha da Corte
- Opened: February 8, 1934

Links
- Website: www.marinha.mil.br/hnmd/hospital-naval-marcilio-dias

The Naval Hospital Marcílio Dias (HNMD) is a Military Organization of the Brazilian Navy located in the city of Rio de Janeiro, in the Lins de Vasconcelos neighborhood. Its name pays homage to Marcílio Dias, hero of the Paraguayan War.

It is the Brazilian Navy 's main health institution and the only one capable of treating highly complex cases. It provides all the Navy's tertiary care and is also a national reference center, receiving patients with complex cases from all over the country.

== History ==
The origins of the Naval Hospital Marcílio Dias can be traced back to the establishment of the Hospital da Marinha da Corte (currently the Central Navy Hospital) in 1834 on Ilha das Cobras. However, it was only in 1848 that the hospital was staffed with doctors and nurses. In 1857, the Nursing Company was created, led by a sergeant.

In 1926, a group of army officers' wives founded the Casa de Marcílio Dias, a philanthropic institution, with the aim of providing social and educational assistance to the children of members of the same armed force. In 1934, the Association that maintained the house donated the property (the house and the surrounding land) to the Navy, which set up the Naval Institute of Biology (INB), officially created on February 8, 1939, for experimental research, preparation of biological research and technical teaching, with a hospital as an annex for the treatment of Navy personnel suffering from infectious or parasitic diseases.

As demand for services increased, the Navy acquired a plot of land next to the Institute, where a new pavilion was built, providing 120 beds for patients with advanced tuberculosis. Inaugurated in June 1940, it was named the Carlos Frederico Pavilion after the last chief of the Imperial Navy Health Corps. A new pavilion was inaugurated on December 17, 1946, with 42 beds for patients in isolation, named the Heraldo Maciel Pavilion after INB's first director.

=== The Hospital ===
On August 16, 1949, the INB was renamed the Hospital for Infectious Diseases. On April 23, 1951, the then President of the Republic, Getúlio Vargas, signed Decree No. 29,486, in which he determined that the INB and the set of existing buildings would be renamed the Marcílio Dias Naval Hospital (HNMD), responsible for coordinating, controlling and providing assistance in the area of the 1st Naval District, as well as teaching and research. In the same year, the complex was expanded with the Meirelles Pavilion, enabling it to operate as a general hospital. In 1954, the Brazilian Navy once again turned its attention to research, setting up an Experimental Surgery Section at the HNMD to train its doctors and research new drugs, the embryo of the future Biomedical Research Institute (IPB).

During the military dictatorship, on September 22, 1972, President Emílio Garrastazu Médici signed Decree No. 71.121, to have the Biomedical Research Institute in its structure, transformed into a Scientific and Technological Institution, maintaining links with the Navy's Science and Technology Secretariat, and restructured under the name Centro Médico Naval Marcílio Dias (CMNMD). This new organization was responsible for coordinating, controlling and providing medical care in the region of the 1st Naval District, as well as teaching and research.

In the same year, with the creation of the Navy Health Fund, the need to build a base hospital was affirmed, and the foundation stone was laid on July 16, 1975. Inaugurated on February 8, 1980, the CMNMD continued to provide care and incorporated the School for Nursing Assistants that had been operating at the Navy Central Hospital. Still under the dictatorship, President Ernesto Geisel, in 1979, sanctioned Decree No. 83.161, the institution's school was reorganized and expanded as the School of Health, of higher and medium level, recognized by the Ministry of Education (MEC), with courses in Nursing Assistant and Technician, Residencies in Medicine, Dentistry, Nursing and Pharmacy; as well as courses in Basic Life Support (distance learning) and Operative Nursing. Also in 1979, through Law 5450/79, Geisel signed that the former Experimental Surgery Section became a Department of the CMNMD. In 1981, new facilities were built for the Biomedical Research Institute.

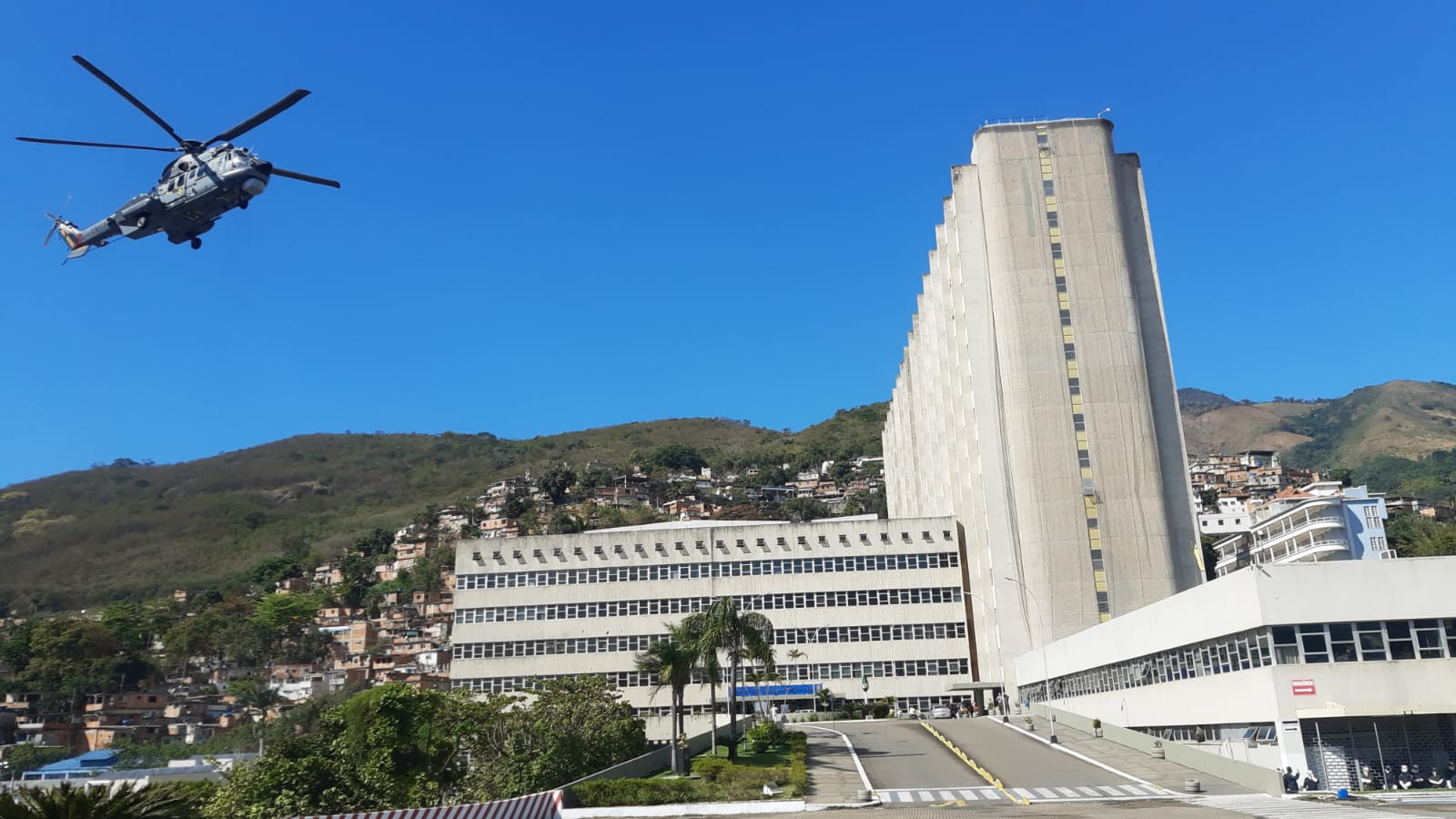
Aircraft approaching Marcílio Dias Hospital

In the Brazilian Democracy, on March 24, 1988, by Decree No. 95.869, José Sarney determined that the Naval Medical Center was extinguished and returned to its former name of Marcílio Dias Naval Hospital, incorporating the CMNMD's functions of technical training and improvement of the military in the area of Health, as well as research.

Under the Luiz Inácio Lula government, the Biomedical Research Institute was refurbished in 2007 and on November 9, 2009, it was installed in a new annex, but it remained subordinate to the HNMD. In recent years, the hospital's facilities have been refurbished, the Medical and Statistical Archive Sector has been reorganized, computerized and connected to the other sectors of the hospital, a Nuclear Medicine Centre has been created, which according to the Oswaldo Cruz Foundation (Fiocruz) is “a reference in the care of radio-accident victims”, the Central Dental Clinic underwent expansion and revitalization, and new high-tech equipment was acquired, According to Michael Ribeiro, “this revitalization of the equipment has made diagnoses more effective and less costly, as it reduces the need for referrals to partner clinics”.

Located in a Lins de Vasconcelos neighborhood considered dangerous, the hospital lives in fear of violence caused by drug trafficking and the lack of policing in the area. In December 2024, doctor Gisele Mendes de Souza e Mello was shot by a stray bullet while working at the hospital. Gisele had to undergo surgery, but she couldn't resist and died after the procedure. On the morning of 21 February 2025, a suspect involved in the death of a Navy doctor inside the Marcílio Dias Hospital, identified as Marcos Vinícius Vitória Nascimento, known as Poka, was killed during a Military Police operation in the Lins Complex, in the city of Rio de Janeiro. On 20 March 2025, more two suspects involved in the death of the Navy doctor inside the Marcílio Dias Naval Hospital were killed during a Military Police operation in the Lins Complex, in the same region. On 16 June 2025, the Civl Police arrested Emerson Edgleises da Conceição Silveira, 23 years old, suspected of involvement in the death of the doctor and Navy commander, Captain Gisele Mendes de Souza e Mell. Emerson was located and captured after leaving his girlfriend's house in the Pilares neighborhood, in the city of Rio de Janeiro.

== Capacity ==
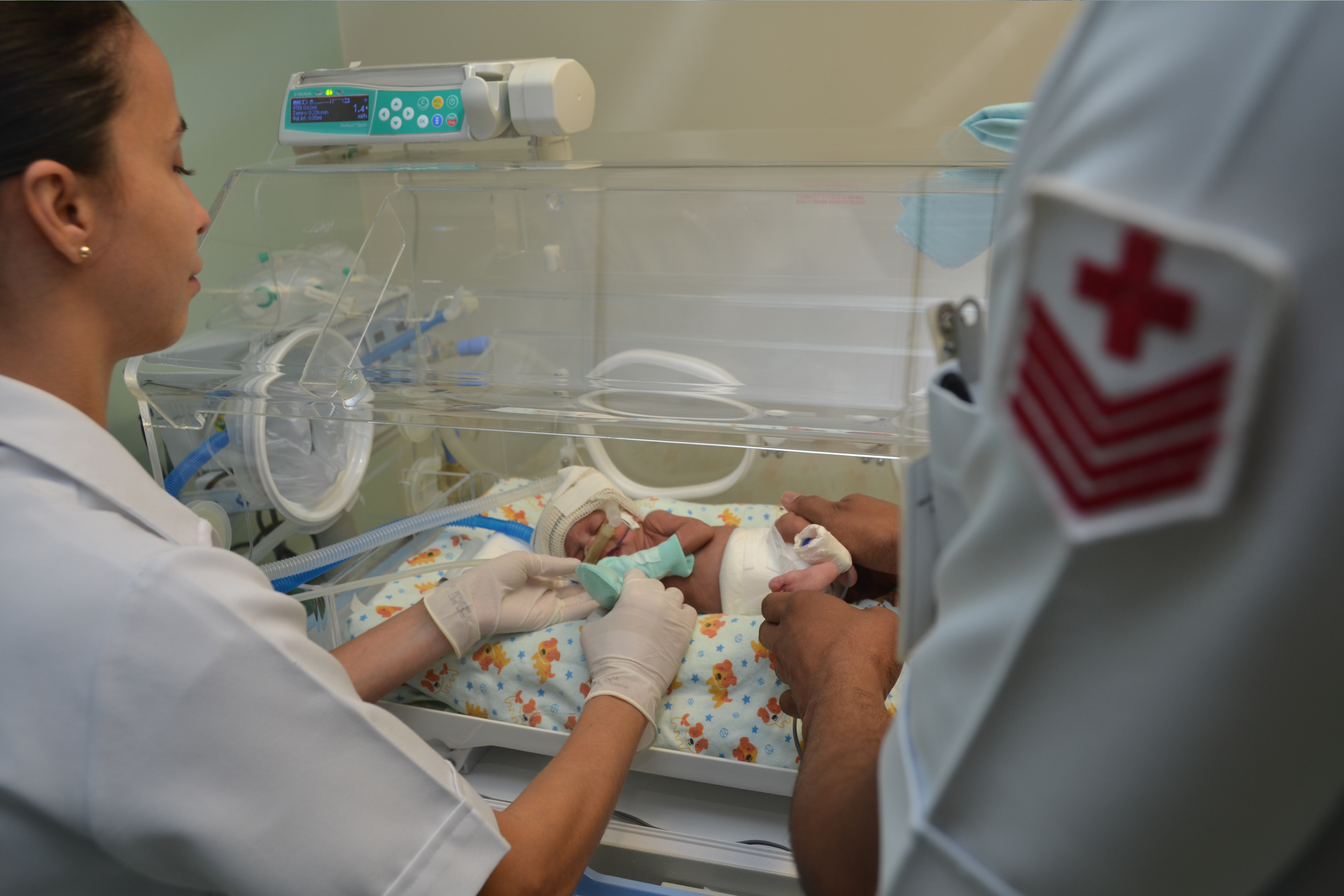
Pediatric and Obstetric Attendants

According to the hospital's statistics section, with the most recent survey having been carried out in 2013, the hospital has 618 beds, 11 operating rooms, 101 medical outpatient clinics, 4 dental offices and 54 clinics.

== Research ==
The hospital seeks to support research, teaching and technical assistance in biomedical areas through the AMarcílio Foundation, which is a foundation that supports scientific research.
