= Esther Apuahe =

Papua New Guinean surgeon

- Born: Rabaul, Papua New Guinea
- Education: University of Papua New Guinea
- Years active: 2002-present
- Medical career
- Profession: Surgeon
- Field: General Surgery, Neurosurgery
- Institutions: Townsville Hospital, Port Moresby General Hospital
- Awards: Westpac Outstanding Women

Esther Roibete Apuahe is a neurosurgeon from Morobe, Papua New Guinea, and the first female surgeon in the country. She was born in 1978 in Rabaul and has four sisters. Her father was a school teacher and instilled in Apuahe the importance of education. She is married and has three children. Esther Apuahe has contributed greatly to the field of neurosurgery, especially in the Africa-Asia region.

== Education ==
=== Grade School ===
Esther Apuahe attended grade school in Rabaul and Lae in Papua New Guinea, moving around with her family. She was later selected as an AUSAID scholarship recipient to attend secondary school at Blackheath and Thornburgh College in Australia.

=== Professional School ===
Apuahe attended the University of Papua New Guinea in 1998 and graduated in 2002 with a MBBS. From 2008 to 2012, Apuahe earned a Master of Surgery at the University of Papua New Guinea, becoming the first woman to finish the program. Starting in 2015, Apuahe worked on specializing in neurosurgery; she had training through the Royal Australian College.

== Career ==
Prior to her surgical career, Apuahe worked in an emergency department in Rabaul. She also worked one year in pediatrics. In 2007, Apuahe worked at Vanimo General Hospital as a general surgeon, prior to specializing. In 2019, Apuahe was stationed in a one-year neurosurgery placement at Townsville Hospital as part of her training in neurosurgery. In 2015, Apuahe became the neurosurgeon at Port Moresby General Hospital following the death of Papua New Guinea's first neurosurgeon, Dr. William Kaptigau.

== Contributions ==
Esther Apuahe received the Steamships Public Sector Award of the Westpac Outstanding Women, recognizing her journey and work in the field of neurosurgery. Apuahe has contributed to various neuroscience journals on the progress of developing fields of neurosurgery in the Africa-Asia region.

== Impact on the Africa-Asia Region ==
As part of efforts to develop the field of neurosurgery throughout Africa and Asia, Esther Apuahe is part of the Africa-Asia Neurosurgery Collaborative Group (ASAFRIN), an initiative to address new and existing brain tumor programs, as there is an increased incidence of neurological cancers in the region. The brain tumor program of Papua New Guinea has a level III out of five, due in part to Apuahe's work.
