= Desiree Cox =

Bahamian physician

Dr. Desiree Cox (born 1964) is a Bahamian doctor. She became the first Rhodes Scholar from the Bahamas in 1987 when she obtained a scholarship to Pembroke College, Oxford. Cox studied medicine at Oxford and later philosophy at Cambridge before practising as a psychiatrist. She served as a consultant and special advisor on urban renewal to the Prime Minister of the Bahamas from 2004 to 2007. In 2009, she became the Director of Community Clinical Education at the Grand Bahama campus of Ross University.

== Early life and education ==
Cox was born on 20 March 1964 in Nassau, Bahamas, the daughter of James and Ena-Mae Cox. She attended Queen’s College secondary school, graduating in 1982. She obtained a bachelor of science degree from McGill University in Montreal in 1986.

In 1987, she received a Rhodes Scholarship. She attended Pembroke College, Oxford where she studied medicine and graduated with an MBBS in 1992. She later obtained both an MPhil and a Ph.D from Wolfson College, Cambridge.

== Career ==
Cox practised psychiatry at Maudsley Hospital in London. In 2003, she returned to the Bahamas. She served as a consultant and special advisor to the Prime Minister on urban renewal from 2004 to 2007.

In 2006, she became a Fellow of the Academy of Medicine of the Bahamas. In 2009, she became Director of Community Clinical Education at Ross University's Bahamian campus.

Cox is also the CEO of The HEALinc Innovation Incubator.

== Awards and honours ==
In 1987, Cox became the first Rhodes Scholar from the Bahamas. In 2013, the post office released a 70 cent stamp bearing the images of the three Rhodes scholars from the Bahamas, Cox being one of them.

In 2017, Cox was chosen by Pembroke College as one of a select few alumni to have her portrait hung in its Great Hall.

In 2023, she was announced as one of the recipients of the Bahamas' Special Golden Jubilee of Independence Awards.
