= Dalva Mendes =

Brazilian military physician

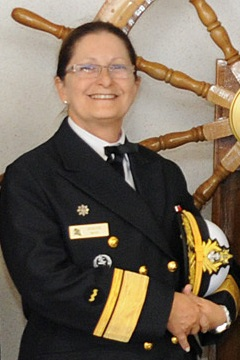
- Rear Adm. Mendes
- Born: Dalva Maria Carvalho Mendes; March 1956 (age 70); Rio de Janeiro, Brazil
- Education: Rio de Janeiro State University
- Occupations: Military officer, physician
- Known for: First woman Rear Admiral in the Brazilian Navy
- Children: Two

Dalva Maria Carvalho Mendes (Rio de Janeiro, March 1956) is a Brazilian doctor and soldier. She was the first woman to be made a rear admiral in the Brazilian Navy.

== Biography ==
Mendes was born in 1956, the daughter of a fisherman, and as a child she helped to pull the fish-laden net aboard ship. She studied medicine and graduated from the Rio de Janeiro State University (UERJ). She joined the Brazilian Navy as part of the first all-female class in 1981.

A graduate of the Navy Health Corps (CSM-Md), she trained as a second lieutenant, an assistant at the Navy Health School. When she became a corvette captain, she became an instructor at the Navy Health School.

Dalva was a surgical assistant, professor at the Navy Anesthesia Teaching and Training Center and also deputy director of Teaching at the Naval Hospital Marcílio Dias. She attended the Escola Superior de Guerra (ESG) and the Escola de Guerra Naval (EGN).

She was promoted to Rear Admiral (two stars), a general officer in the Navy. on 26 November 2012, by then-President Dilma Rousseff. Her previous rank was Sea and War captain.

After she joining the reserves, she was invited to return to active service by the Navy commander, squadron admiral Eduardo Bacellar Leal Ferreira. As of 2018, in addition to assisting Ferreira, she has worked as a direct advisor to Vice Admiral Edmar da Cruz Arêas, Navy Health Director.

== Honors and recognitions ==
Mendes received several decorations including the Order of Naval Merit, the Tamandaré Merit Medal and the Military Medal with Gold Pass.
