= María Elisa Rivera Díaz =

Puerto Rican medical doctor

María Elisa Rivera de Díaz
- Born: María Elisa Rivera y León; January 20, 1887; Arecibo, Puerto Rico
- Died: March 12, 1981 (aged 94); San Juan, Puerto Rico
- Education: Women's Medical College of Baltimore (MD)
- Occupation: Doctor
- Spouse: José E. Díaz García

María Elisa Rivera y León de Díaz (January 20, 1887 – March 12, 1981) was one of the first four women from Puerto Rico to earn a medical degree; the other three were Ana Janer in 1909, Palmira Gatell in 1910, and Dolores Piñero in 1913. Ana Janer and Rivera graduated in the same medical school class in 1909 and thus could both be considered the first female Puerto Rican physician.

Rivera graduated from the Women's Medical College of Baltimore, and started her medical practice that same year. She was the first Puerto Rican woman to graduate medical school with the highest honors.

== See also ==
- List of Puerto Ricans
- History of women in Puerto Rico
