= Milica Šviglin Čavov =

First Croatian female doctor

Milica Šviglin Čavov was the first Croatian female doctor. She graduated from the Medical School in Zürich in 1893, but was not allowed to work in Croatia. Her first job was in a health resort in Germany. She married a Bulgarian doctor, Bogdan Chavov, and moved to Bulgaria and opened a private practice with her husband.
