= Ana Janer =

First from Puerto Rico to earn a medical degree

Ana Janer was one of the first two women from Puerto Rico to earn a medical degree. Janer and María Elisa Rivera Díaz graduated in the same medical school class in 1909, and thus can both be considered the first female Puerto Rican physician. They both started their practice that same year.

== See also ==
- List of Puerto Ricans
- History of women in Puerto Rico
